= Results of the 1998 Australian federal election in New South Wales =

1998 Australian federal election (New South Wales)
- 3 October 1998

All 50 New South Wales seats in the Australian House of Representatives and 6 seats in the Australian Senate
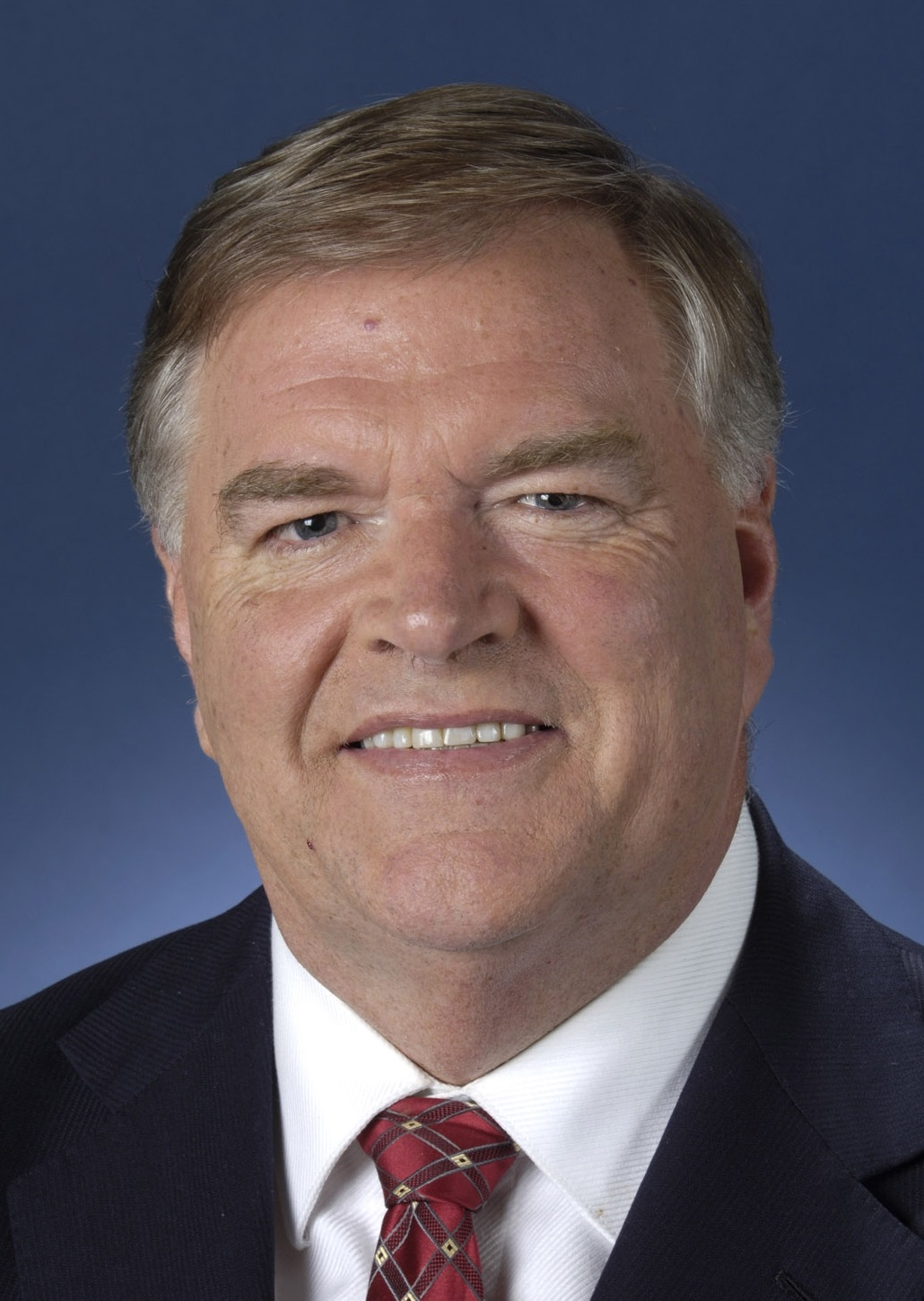

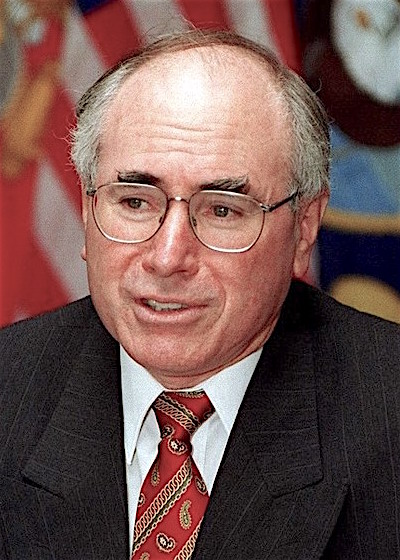
	First party	Second party
Leader	Kim Beazley	John Howard
Party	Labor	Liberal/National coalition
Last election	20 seats	29 seats
Seats won	22 seats	27 seats
Seat change	▲2	▼2
Popular vote	1,489,021	1,424,671
Percentage	40.1%	38.4%
Swing	▲0.5	▼7.5
TPP	51.54%	48.46%
TPP swing	▲4.11	▼4.11

This is a list of electoral division results for the Australian 1998 federal election in the state of New South Wales.

== Overall results ==
Turnout 96.4% (CV) — Informal 3.6%
Party	Votes	%	Swing	Seats	Change
Liberal	1,131,545	30.49	−2.97	18	▼1
National	293,126	7.90	−4.17	9	▼1
Liberal/National Coalition	1,424,671	38.39	−7.14	27	▼2
Labor	1,489,021	40.12	+0.56	22	▲2
One Nation	332,510	8.96	+8.96		
Democrats	154,496	4.16	−2.38		
Greens	98,647	2.66	+0.14		
Independents	96,719	2.61	+0.20	1	Steady
Unity	57,666	1.55	+1.55		
Christian Democrats	38,023	1.02	+0.10		
No Aircraft Noise	5,298	0.14			
Democratic Socialist	3,296	0.09	1.37		
Natural Law	3,065	0.08	0.31		
Citizens Electoral Council	2,332	0.06			
Progressive Labour	1,131	0.03			
Australia First	1,024	0.03			
Abolish Child Support	544	0.01			
Socialist Equality	531	0.01			
No GST	240	0.01			
Republican	227	0.01			
Total	3,711,144			50	
Two-party-preferred vote
Liberal/National Coalition	1,766,640	48.46	−4.11	27	▼2
Labor	1,879,281	51.54	+4.11	22	▲2
Invalid/blank votes	217,024	5.4			
Turnout	3,866,083	94.8			
Registered voters	4,076,081				
Source: Federal Elections 1998

== Results by division ==
=== Banks ===
This section is an excerpt from Electoral results for the Division of Banks § 1998

1998 Australian federal election: Banks
Party	Candidate	Votes	%	±%
Labor	Daryl Melham	32,599	44.52	+0.96
Liberal	Stephen Iacono	24,744	33.79	−5.70
One Nation	Phillip Maddison	8,010	10.94	+10.94
Democrats	Alison Bailey	3,128	4.27	−3.33
Unity	Bill Chen	2,250	3.07	+3.07
Christian Democrats	Brian Grigg	1,422	1.94	+1.94
Greens	Greg Archer	1,075	1.47	+1.47
Total formal votes		73,228	96.06	+0.30
Informal votes		3,006	3.94	−0.30
Turnout		76,234	95.16	−1.68
Two-party-preferred result
Labor	Daryl Melham	41,818	57.11	+5.70
Liberal	Stephen Iacono	31,410	42.89	−5.70
Labor hold		Swing	+5.70	

=== Barton ===
This section is an excerpt from Electoral results for the Division of Barton § 1998

1998 Australian federal election: Barton
Party	Candidate	Votes	%	±%
Labor	Robert McClelland	37,382	49.61	+1.23
Liberal	James Jordan	26,430	35.08	−6.09
One Nation	Neil Baird	5,162	6.85	+6.85
Unity	Lin Tang	3,182	4.22	+4.22
Democrats	Craig Chung	2,028	2.69	−2.73
Greens	Adam Nelson	1,161	1.54	+1.54
Total formal votes		75,345	95.73	+0.01
Informal votes		3,364	4.27	−0.01
Turnout		78,709	94.66	−1.15
Two-party-preferred result
Labor	Robert McClelland	45,029	59.76	+5.42
Liberal	James Jordan	30,316	40.24	−5.42
Labor hold		Swing	+5.42	

=== Bennelong ===
This section is an excerpt from Electoral results for the Division of Bennelong § 1998

1998 Australian federal election: Bennelong
Party	Candidate	Votes	%	±%
Liberal	John Howard	36,976	49.24	−4.59
Labor	Wendy Mahon	23,929	31.87	−0.29
Democrats	Bob Springett	3,504	4.67	−1.57
One Nation	Gordon King	3,099	4.13	+4.13
Unity	Sarah Kemp	2,923	3.89	+3.89
Greens	Jamie Parker	2,306	3.07	+0.60
Independent	David Lung	1,319	1.76	+1.76
No Aircraft Noise	William Gollam	341	0.45	−1.28
Independent	John Dawson	186	0.25	−0.03
Abolish Child Support	Prime Minister John Piss the Family Court and Legal Aid	183	0.24	+0.24
Independent	Julien Paul Droulers	128	0.17	−0.08
Natural Law	Tim Carr	123	0.16	−0.14
Independent	Marcus Aussie-Stone	71	0.09	+0.09
Total formal votes		75,088	94.33	−1.85
Informal votes		4,513	5.67	+1.85
Turnout		79,601	95.07	−1.67
Two-party-preferred result
Liberal	John Howard	42,075	56.03	−4.10
Labor	Wendy Mahon	33,013	43.97	+4.10
Liberal hold		Swing	−4.10	

=== Berowra ===
This section is an excerpt from Electoral results for the Division of Berowra § 1998

1998 Australian federal election: Berowra
Party	Candidate	Votes	%	±%
Liberal	Philip Ruddock	43,180	54.36	−4.24
Labor	Nola McCarroll	21,763	27.40	+5.84
Democrats	Bernard Teuben	5,255	6.62	−0.82
One Nation	Wayne Stewart	4,788	6.03	+6.03
Greens	Andrew Burke	2,561	3.22	+0.05
Christian Democrats	Owen Nannelli	1,893	2.38	+2.38
Total formal votes		79,440	96.96	−0.23
Informal votes		2,492	3.04	+0.23
Turnout		81,932	95.17	−1.42
Two-party-preferred result
Liberal	Philip Ruddock	50,457	63.52	−4.88
Labor	Nola McCarroll	28,983	36.48	+4.88
Liberal hold		Swing	−4.88	

=== Blaxland ===
This section is an excerpt from Electoral results for the Division of Blaxland § 1998

1998 Australian federal election: Blaxland
Party	Candidate	Votes	%	±%
Labor	Michael Hatton	44,096	61.42	+2.71
Liberal	Maureen Shelley	15,649	21.80	−9.25
One Nation	Hussein Abou-Ghaida	5,052	7.04	+7.04
Unity	Harold Hassapis	2,536	3.53	+3.53
Democrats	Matthew Hua	1,733	2.41	−1.05
Christian Democrats	Kylie Mary Laurence	1,623	2.26	+0.93
Greens	Benjamin Donnelly	1,107	1.54	+1.54
Total formal votes		71,796	94.46	+1.08
Informal votes		4,211	5.54	−1.08
Turnout		76,007	94.31	−1.75
Two-party-preferred result
Labor	Michael Hatton	51,738	72.06	+9.08
Liberal	Maureen Shelley	20,058	27.94	−9.08
Labor hold		Swing	+9.08	

=== Bradfield ===
This section is an excerpt from Electoral results for the Division of Bradfield § 1998

1998 Australian federal election: Bradfield
Party	Candidate	Votes	%	±%
Liberal	Brendan Nelson	47,725	64.37	−0.38
Labor	Nadesu Kailainathan	13,937	18.80	+2.99
Democrats	Carmel Morris	5,791	7.81	−1.46
One Nation	Robert Webeck	2,832	3.82	+3.82
Greens	Marc Allen	2,218	2.99	−0.47
Christian Democrats	Margaret Ratcliffe	1,228	1.66	−0.10
Natural Law	Alexandra Kiely	412	0.56	+0.27
Total formal votes		74,143	97.15	+0.08
Informal votes		2,175	2.85	−0.08
Turnout		76,318	94.61	−1.84
Two-party-preferred result
Liberal	Brendan Nelson	54,276	73.20	−2.56
Labor	Nadesu Kailainathan	19,867	26.80	+2.56
Liberal hold		Swing	−2.56	

=== Calare ===
This section is an excerpt from Electoral results for the Division of Calare § 1998

1998 Australian federal election: Calare
Party	Candidate	Votes	%	±%
Independent	Peter Andren	29,522	40.55	+11.18
Labor	Terence Corkin	17,425	23.93	−5.03
National	Rod Blume	8,554	11.75	−9.04
One Nation	Martin Gleeson	7,954	10.92	+10.92
Liberal	Garry Sloan	7,640	10.49	−5.24
Greens	Joan Lambert	676	0.93	−0.85
Democrats	Ben Saul	581	0.80	−0.36
Unity	Nelle Edwards	290	0.40	+0.40
Citizens Electoral Council	David Simpson	168	0.23	+0.23
Total formal votes		72,812	96.62	−1.15
Informal votes		2,548	3.38	+1.15
Turnout		75,360	96.20	−0.62
Notional two-party-preferred count
National	Rod Blume	38,744	53.21	+0.31
Labor	Terence Corkin	34,068	46.79	−0.31
Two-candidate-preferred result
Independent	Peter Andren	52,653	72.31	+8.99
Labor	Terence Corkin	20,159	27.69	
Independent hold		Swing	+8.99	

=== Charlton ===
This section is an excerpt from Electoral results for the Division of Charlton § 1998

1998 Australian federal election: Charlton
Party	Candidate	Votes	%	±%
Labor	Kelly Hoare	39,604	49.32	−0.68
Liberal	Bruce Gatgens	22,175	27.61	−5.86
One Nation	Pamela Young	9,664	12.03	+12.03
Democrats	Stephen Bisgrove	3,689	4.59	−3.80
Greens	Nathan Ross	2,679	3.34	−1.66
Christian Democrats	Ralph Gourlay	2,494	3.11	+3.11
Total formal votes		80,305	96.97	+0.42
Informal votes		2,513	3.03	−0.42
Turnout		82,818	96.20	−1.14
Two-party-preferred result
Labor	Kelly Hoare	50,570	62.97	+3.65
Liberal	Bruce Gatgens	29,735	37.03	−3.65
Labor hold		Swing	+3.65	

=== Chifley ===
This section is an excerpt from Electoral results for the Division of Chifley § 1998

1998 Australian federal election: Chifley
Party	Candidate	Votes	%	±%
Labor	Roger Price	43,496	59.26	+1.30
Liberal	John Coles	14,485	19.73	−7.11
One Nation	Joe Damjanovic	7,400	10.08	+10.08
Democrats	Andrew Owen	3,595	4.90	−4.15
Christian Democrats	Joseph Wyness	1,520	2.07	−0.68
Greens	Robert Nolan	1,014	1.38	+1.38
Unity	Aooe Boyd Pio	969	1.32	+1.32
Independent	Dave Vincent	761	1.04	+1.04
Natural Law	Zahra Razavikashan	162	0.22	−0.66
Total formal votes		73,402	94.11	−0.64
Informal votes		4,597	5.89	+0.64
Turnout		77,999	94.68	−1.37
Two-party-preferred result
Labor	Roger Price	52,037	70.89	+6.36
Liberal	John Coles	21,365	29.11	−6.36
Labor hold		Swing	+6.36	

=== Cook ===
This section is an excerpt from Electoral results for the Division of Cook § 1998

1998 Australian federal election: Cook
Party	Candidate	Votes	%	±%
Liberal	Bruce Baird	37,075	50.22	−4.88
Labor	Peri Young	22,850	30.95	−0.44
One Nation	Gareth Kimberley	6,144	8.32	+8.32
Democrats	Terri Richardson	3,147	4.26	−3.86
Greens	John Kaye	1,556	2.11	+2.11
Unity	Zanthe Abdurahman	1,103	1.49	+1.49
Independent	Darren Boehm	997	1.35	+1.35
Christian Democrats	Malcolm Smith	948	1.28	+1.28
Total formal votes		73,820	95.97	−1.55
Informal votes		3,103	4.03	+1.55
Turnout		76,923	95.28	−1.49
Two-party-preferred result
Liberal	Bruce Baird	43,510	58.94	−3.34
Labor	Peri Young	30,310	41.06	+3.34
Liberal hold		Swing	−3.34	

=== Cowper ===
This section is an excerpt from Electoral results for the Division of Cowper § 1998

1998 Australian federal election: Cowper
Party	Candidate	Votes	%	±%
National	Garry Nehl	30,810	42.01	−14.28
Labor	Paul Sekfy	24,213	33.02	+1.03
One Nation	John Willey	11,234	15.32	+15.32
Greens	Jillian Cranny	2,960	4.04	−2.20
Democrats	Paul Anthony Corben	2,570	3.50	−1.98
Independent	Mark Spencer	1,550	2.11	+2.11
Total formal votes		73,337	97.26	−0.44
Informal votes		2,068	2.74	+0.44
Turnout		75,405	95.19	−0.99
Two-party-preferred result
National	Garry Nehl	41,335	56.36	−5.20
Labor	Paul Sekfy	32,002	43.64	+5.20
National hold		Swing	−5.20	

=== Cunningham ===
This section is an excerpt from Electoral results for the Division of Cunningham § 1998

1998 Australian federal election: Cunningham
Party	Candidate	Votes	%	±%
Labor	Stephen Martin	37,592	52.94	+0.35
Liberal	Alan Akhurst	17,285	24.34	−5.47
One Nation	John Curtis	5,378	7.57	+7.57
Democrats	Stephen Ivaneza	4,108	5.79	+0.80
Greens	Les Robinson	3,158	4.45	−1.39
Christian Democrats	Robert O'Neill	1,755	2.47	−0.16
Democratic Socialist	Margaret Perrott	663	0.93	+0.93
Unity	Jennifer van der Horn	550	0.77	+0.77
Independent	Frank Coluccio	515	0.73	+0.73
Total formal votes		71,004	96.51	+0.12
Informal votes		2,564	3.49	−0.12
Turnout		73,568	95.27	−1.26
Two-party-preferred result
Labor	Stephen Martin	48,423	68.20	+5.29
Liberal	Alan Akhurst	22,581	31.80	−5.29
Labor hold		Swing	+5.29	

=== Dobell ===
This section is an excerpt from Electoral results for the Division of Dobell § 1998

1998 Australian federal election: Dobell
Party	Candidate	Votes	%	±%
Labor	Michael Lee	34,770	45.26	+1.40
Liberal	David Parker	29,014	37.77	−5.54
One Nation	June Beckett	7,300	9.50	+9.50
Democrats	David Mott	2,546	3.31	−3.80
Greens	Philip Dwyer	1,626	2.12	+2.12
Christian Democrats	Karen Russell	1,564	2.04	+0.26
Total formal votes		76,820	96.89	−0.17
Informal votes		2,466	3.11	+0.17
Turnout		79,286	95.69	−1.05
Two-party-preferred result
Labor	Michael Lee	40,980	53.35	+3.27
Liberal	David Parker	35,840	46.65	−3.27
Labor hold		Swing	+3.27	

=== Eden-Monaro ===
This section is an excerpt from Electoral results for the Division of Eden-Monaro § 1998

1998 Australian federal election: Eden-Monaro
Party	Candidate	Votes	%	±%
Liberal	Gary Nairn	31,654	43.25	−2.70
Labor	Steve Whan	28,692	39.21	+1.30
One Nation	Adam Miller	7,004	9.57	+9.57
Democrats	Dan McMillan	3,343	4.57	+0.98
Greens	Rosemary Beaumont	2,301	3.14	−0.39
Citizens Electoral Council	Gordon Harriott	188	0.26	+0.26
Total formal votes		73,182	96.79	−0.22
Informal votes		2,425	3.21	+0.22
Turnout		75,607	95.79	−0.17
Two-party-preferred result
Liberal	Gary Nairn	36,722	50.18	−4.58
Labor	Steve Whan	36,460	49.82	+4.58
Liberal hold		Swing	−4.58	

=== Farrer ===
This section is an excerpt from Electoral results for the Division of Farrer § 1998

1998 Australian federal election: Farrer
Party	Candidate	Votes	%	±%
National	Tim Fischer	36,602	52.87	−13.46
Labor	Vivien Voss	16,489	23.82	−0.85
One Nation	Don McKinnon	9,664	13.96	+13.96
Democrats	Rohan Sharp	2,940	4.25	−0.03
Independent	Amanda Duncan-Strelec	2,234	3.23	+3.23
Australia First	Cliff Broderick	728	1.05	+1.05
Citizens Electoral Council	Alan Boyd	329	0.48	+0.48
Abolish Child Support	Maurice Furlan	240	0.35	+0.35
Total formal votes		69,226	96.07	−0.51
Informal votes		2,830	3.93	+0.51
Turnout		72,056	95.91	−0.11
Two-party-preferred result
National	Tim Fischer	44,733	64.62	−6.61
Labor	Vivien Voss	24,493	35.38	+6.61
National hold		Swing	−6.61	

=== Fowler ===
This section is an excerpt from Electoral results for the Division of Fowler § 1998

1998 Australian federal election: Fowler
Party	Candidate	Votes	%	±%
Labor	Julia Irwin	49,472	61.69	+0.63
Liberal	Lorna Doona	13,705	17.09	−9.31
Unity	Andrew Su	8,532	10.64	+10.64
One Nation	Rodney Smith	5,886	7.34	+7.34
Democrats	Mark Stevens	2,603	3.25	−4.12
Total formal votes		80,198	94.22	+2.29
Informal votes		4,920	5.78	−2.29
Turnout		85,118	93.93	−1.93
Two-party-preferred result
Labor	Julia Irwin	61,216	76.33	+8.06
Liberal	Lorna Doona	18,982	23.67	−8.06
Labor hold		Swing	+8.06	

=== Gilmore ===
This section is an excerpt from Electoral results for the Division of Gilmore § 1998

1998 Australian federal election: Gilmore
Party	Candidate	Votes	%	±%
Liberal	Joanna Gash	33,390	45.09	−5.42
Labor	Sandra McCarthy	26,509	35.80	−2.51
One Nation	Tom Dell	8,206	11.08	+11.08
Democrats	Peter Fraser	2,444	3.30	−1.50
Greens	Jane Bange	2,020	2.73	−0.11
Christian Democrats	Steve Ryan	1,481	2.00	+0.44
Total formal votes		74,050	97.70	+0.05
Informal votes		1,743	2.30	−0.05
Turnout		75,793	96.21	−0.86
Two-party-preferred result
Liberal	Joanna Gash	40,013	54.04	−2.20
Labor	Sandra McCarthy	34,037	45.96	+2.20
Liberal hold		Swing	−2.20	

=== Grayndler ===
This section is an excerpt from Electoral results for the Division of Grayndler § 1998

1998 Australian federal election: Grayndler
Party	Candidate	Votes	%	±%
Labor	Anthony Albanese	41,971	55.67	+5.19
Liberal	Michael Armani	15,628	20.73	−2.87
Democrats	Katherine Cummings	4,301	5.70	+0.72
Unity	Ning Gao	3,621	4.80	+4.80
Greens	Sean Roberts	3,373	4.47	−0.11
No Aircraft Noise	Sylvia Hale	2,816	3.74	−9.87
One Nation	Warren Webb	2,342	3.11	+3.11
Christian Democrats	Michael Robinson	630	0.84	−0.19
Democratic Socialist	Michael Karadjis	535	0.71	+0.71
Natural Law	John Ryder	177	0.23	−0.20
Total formal votes		75,394	94.79	+0.23
Informal votes		4,142	5.21	−0.23
Turnout		79,536	92.59	−2.65
Two-party-preferred result
Labor	Anthony Albanese	54,528	72.32	+5.95
Liberal	Michael Armani	20,866	27.68	−5.95
Labor hold		Swing	+5.95	

=== Greenway ===
This section is an excerpt from Electoral results for the Division of Greenway § 1998

1998 Australian federal election: Greenway
Party	Candidate	Votes	%	±%
Labor	Frank Mossfield	36,010	46.43	+2.74
Liberal	Mathew Cross	23,865	30.77	−7.27
One Nation	Bill Nixon	7,774	10.02	+10.02
Democrats	Peter Reddy	3,497	4.51	−3.78
Christian Democrats	Bob Bawden	3,292	4.24	+0.99
Greens	Jocelyn Howden	1,459	1.88	+1.88
Unity	Reynolds Bonuedi	1,082	1.39	+1.39
Independent	Salvinder Dhillon	586	0.76	+0.76
Total formal votes		77,565	94.49	−0.21
Informal votes		4,522	5.51	+0.21
Turnout		82,087	95.09	−1.11
Two-party-preferred result
Labor	Frank Mossfield	46,493	59.94	+6.55
Liberal	Mathew Cross	31,072	40.06	−6.55
Labor hold		Swing	+6.55	

=== Gwydir ===
This section is an excerpt from Electoral results for the Division of Gwydir § 1998

1998 Australian federal election: Gwydir
Party	Candidate	Votes	%	±%
National	John Anderson	30,829	46.14	−16.18
Labor	Anne Murnain	17,773	26.60	−1.67
One Nation	Bob Johns	13,875	20.77	+20.77
Democrats	Ken Graham	1,624	2.43	−2.79
Christian Democrats	Derrick Paxton	1,106	1.66	+1.66
Independent	Jim Perrett	856	1.28	−2.90
Independent	Gary Edwards	747	1.12	+1.12
Total formal votes		66,810	96.05	−1.40
Informal votes		2,745	3.95	+1.40
Turnout		69,555	95.37	−1.34
Two-party-preferred result
National	John Anderson	42,480	63.58	−4.93
Labor	Anne Murnain	24,330	36.42	+4.93
National hold		Swing	−4.93	

=== Hughes ===
This section is an excerpt from Electoral results for the Division of Hughes § 1998

1998 Australian federal election: Hughes
Party	Candidate	Votes	%	±%
Liberal	Danna Vale	38,199	46.97	−2.01
Labor	David Hill	27,711	34.07	−3.98
One Nation	Reginald Lowder	7,020	8.63	+8.63
Democrats	Adrian Blackburn	3,096	3.81	−2.00
Greens	Jo-Anne Lentern	2,224	2.73	−0.49
Independent	Jim McGoldrick	2,069	2.54	+2.54
Unity	Suthep Kunathai	655	0.81	+0.81
Abolish Child Support	Jim Bowen	211	0.26	+0.26
Republican	Martin Heald	148	0.18	+0.18
Total formal votes		81,333	96.26	−1.01
Informal votes		3,162	3.74	+1.01
Turnout		84,495	96.21	−1.26
Two-party-preferred result
Liberal	Danna Vale	45,154	55.52	+0.63
Labor	David Hill	36,179	44.48	−0.63
Liberal hold		Swing	+0.63	

=== Hume ===
This section is an excerpt from Electoral results for the Division of Hume § 1998

1998 Australian federal election: Hume
Party	Candidate	Votes	%	±%
Liberal	Alby Schultz	28,299	40.92	+40.92
Labor	Mick Veitch	22,466	32.49	−2.28
One Nation	Wayne Hickson	7,471	10.80	+10.80
National	Christine Ferguson	6,433	9.30	−47.74
Democrats	Greg Butler	1,817	2.63	−2.95
Greens	Jan Green	1,560	2.26	−0.36
Independent	Dave Cox	551	0.80	+0.80
Independent	Philip Fowler	413	0.60	+0.60
Citizens Electoral Council	Jean McClung	142	0.21	+0.21
Total formal votes		69,152	95.49	−1.92
Informal votes		3,269	4.51	+1.92
Turnout		72,421	96.26	−0.68
Two-party-preferred result
Liberal	Alby Schultz	40,149	58.06	+58.06
Labor	Mick Veitch	29,003	41.94	+3.71
Liberal gain from National		Swing	+58.06	

=== Hunter ===
This section is an excerpt from Electoral results for the Division of Hunter § 1998

1998 Australian federal election: Hunter
Party	Candidate	Votes	%	±%
Labor	Joel Fitzgibbon	39,187	54.63	+3.88
Liberal	Cherrilyn McLean	11,919	16.62	+16.62
One Nation	Darren Culley	8,131	11.33	+11.33
National	Rob Macaulay	7,976	11.12	−25.92
Democrats	Rod Bennison	2,278	3.18	−1.91
Greens	James Ryan	1,433	2.00	−2.15
Citizens Electoral Council	Ann Lawler	362	0.50	+0.50
Australia First	Peter Meddows	296	0.41	+0.41
Socialist Equality	Terry Cook	152	0.21	+0.21
Total formal votes		71,734	96.71	−0.63
Informal votes		2,441	3.29	+0.63
Turnout		74,175	96.16	−0.89
Two-party-preferred result
Labor	Joel Fitzgibbon	46,405	64.69	+7.72
Liberal	Cherrilyn McLean	25,329	35.31	+35.31
Labor hold		Swing	+7.72	

=== Kingsford Smith ===
This section is an excerpt from Electoral results for the Division of Kingsford Smith § 1998

1998 Australian federal election: Kingsford-Smith
Party	Candidate	Votes	%	±%
Labor	Laurie Brereton	37,123	51.87	+0.30
Liberal	Tio Faulkner	21,852	30.54	−4.48
One Nation	Jack McEwen	4,167	5.82	+5.82
Democrats	Allan Caswell	2,723	3.81	−3.87
Unity	Tatiana Haralambous	2,698	3.77	+3.77
Greens	Murray Matson	2,505	3.50	−0.81
Independent	Vladimir Goryachev	495	0.69	+0.69
Total formal votes		71,563	94.69	−0.26
Informal votes		4,013	5.31	+0.26
Turnout		75,576	93.79	−1.21
Two-party-preferred result
Labor	Laurie Brereton	45,373	63.40	+3.26
Liberal	Tio Faulkner	26,190	36.60	−3.26
Labor hold		Swing	+3.26	

=== Lindsay ===
This section is an excerpt from Electoral results for the Division of Lindsay § 1998

1998 Australian federal election: Lindsay
Party	Candidate	Votes	%	±%
Liberal	Jackie Kelly	31,872	41.70	−0.82
Labor	Cathy O'Toole	29,903	39.12	−1.20
One Nation	Rick Putra	7,621	9.97	+9.97
Democrats	Stephen Lear	2,221	2.91	−3.68
Greens	Lesley Edwards	1,518	1.99	−2.42
Christian Democrats	Jean Eykamp	1,047	1.37	−0.79
Independent	Steve Grim-Reaper	1,043	1.36	+1.36
Unity	Sidney Acker	475	0.62	+0.62
Independent	Dion Bailey	446	0.58	+0.58
Independent	David Lipman	166	0.22	+0.22
Independent	F Ivor	126	0.16	+0.16
Total formal votes		76,438	94.48	−1.94
Informal votes		4,467	5.52	+1.94
Turnout		80,905	96.02	−0.09
Two-party-preferred result
Liberal	Jackie Kelly	39,200	51.28	−0.30
Labor	Cathy O'Toole	37,238	48.72	+0.30
Liberal hold		Swing	−0.30	

=== Lowe ===
This section is an excerpt from Electoral results for the Division of Lowe § 1998

1998 Australian federal election: Lowe
Party	Candidate	Votes	%	±%
Labor	John Murphy	26,730	36.03	−3.07
Liberal	Robert Lee	24,617	33.18	−13.50
Independent	Paul Zammit	11,700	15.77	+15.77
Unity	Chris Wong	2,813	3.79	+3.79
One Nation	John Wright	2,768	3.73	+3.73
Democrats	Jeff Meikle	1,714	2.31	−2.01
No Aircraft Noise	Vince Sicari	1,603	2.16	−0.78
Greens	Natasha Verco	1,300	1.75	−0.13
Christian Democrats	Owen Davies	597	0.80	−0.27
Independent	Giancarlo Maisano	267	0.36	+0.36
Natural Law	Gary Wilkinson	80	0.11	−0.17
Total formal votes		74,189	95.39	+0.62
Informal votes		3,585	4.61	−0.62
Turnout		77,774	94.95	−1.51
Two-party-preferred result
Labor	John Murphy	40,527	54.63	+7.09
Liberal	Robert Lee	33,662	45.37	−7.09
Labor gain from Liberal		Swing	+7.09	

=== Lyne ===
This section is an excerpt from Electoral results for the Division of Lyne § 1998

1998 Australian federal election: Lyne
Party	Candidate	Votes	%	±%
National	Mark Vaile	38,812	51.00	−7.85
Labor	Vicki Grieves	22,456	29.51	+0.50
One Nation	Ray Danton	9,011	11.84	+11.84
Democrats	Allan Quartly	1,974	2.59	−1.92
Greens	Carrie Jacobi	1,501	1.97	−1.34
Christian Democrats	Barry Watts	1,166	1.53	+1.53
Independent	Terrence Simms	984	1.29	+1.29
Citizens Electoral Council	Graeme Muldoon	197	0.26	+0.26
Total formal votes		76,101	96.27	−1.22
Informal votes		2,947	3.73	+1.22
Turnout		79,048	96.15	−0.67
Two-party-preferred result
National	Mark Vaile	45,451	59.72	−5.71
Labor	Vicki Grieves	30,650	40.28	+5.71
National hold		Swing	−5.71	

=== Macarthur ===
This section is an excerpt from Electoral results for the Division of Macarthur § 1998

1998 Australian federal election: Macarthur
Party	Candidate	Votes	%	±%
Liberal	John Fahey	40,395	47.75	−5.62
Labor	Michael Banasik	28,495	33.69	+1.67
One Nation	Damian Alm	9,246	10.93	+10.93
Democrats	Anthony Kaufmann	3,761	4.45	−0.39
Greens	Michelle Wood	2,692	3.18	+0.40
Total formal votes		84,589	96.60	+0.12
Informal votes		2,973	3.40	−0.12
Turnout		87,562	95.49	−1.25
Two-party-preferred result
Liberal	John Fahey	47,060	55.63	−5.06
Labor	Michael Banasik	37,529	44.37	+5.06
Liberal hold		Swing	−5.06	

=== Mackellar ===
This section is an excerpt from Electoral results for the Division of Mackellar § 1998

1998 Australian federal election: Mackellar
Party	Candidate	Votes	%	±%
Liberal	Bronwyn Bishop	39,966	53.68	−0.98
Labor	Nick Lorentzen	14,605	19.62	+0.11
Democrats	Vicki Dimond	7,104	9.54	−1.40
One Nation	John Webeck	5,355	7.19	+7.19
Independent	Bob Ellis	4,729	6.35	+6.35
Greens	Trevor Ockenden	2,500	3.36	−0.97
	Stephen Doric	193	0.26	+0.26
Total formal votes		74,452	96.41	−0.29
Informal votes		2,770	3.59	+0.29
Turnout		77,222	94.67	−1.80
Two-party-preferred result
Liberal	Bronwyn Bishop	48,874	65.64	−0.88
Labor	Nick Lorentzen	25,578	34.36	+0.88
Liberal hold		Swing	−0.88	

=== Macquarie ===
This section is an excerpt from Electoral results for the Division of Macquarie § 1998

1998 Australian federal election: Macquarie
Party	Candidate	Votes	%	±%
Liberal	Kerry Bartlett	32,432	42.74	−5.36
Labor	Maggie Deahm	26,391	34.78	+1.15
One Nation	Les Sheather	7,870	10.37	+10.37
Democrats	Jon Rickard	4,895	6.45	−1.92
Greens	Adele Doust	2,563	3.38	−0.42
Christian Democrats	Shirley Grigg	1,510	1.99	+1.99
Natural Law	Michael Penny	222	0.29	+0.29
Total formal votes		75,883	96.94	+0.88
Informal votes		2,395	3.06	−0.88
Turnout		78,278	95.40	−1.18
Two-party-preferred result
Liberal	Kerry Bartlett	41,053	54.10	−2.26
Labor	Maggie Deahm	34,830	45.90	+2.26
Liberal hold		Swing	−2.26	

=== Mitchell ===
This section is an excerpt from Electoral results for the Division of Mitchell § 1998

1998 Australian federal election: Mitchell
Party	Candidate	Votes	%	±%
Liberal	Alan Cadman	46,203	60.40	−7.03
Labor	Anthony Ellard	16,263	21.26	+2.10
One Nation	Stephen Burke	5,090	6.65	+6.65
Democrats	Helen McAuliffe	3,852	5.04	−3.20
Unity	Ilo Uzunoski	1,988	2.60	+2.60
Greens	Cindy Taylor	1,719	2.25	+2.25
Christian Democrats	Ken Gregory	1,235	1.61	+1.61
Natural Law	Michael Lyons	145	0.19	−0.28
Total formal votes		76,495	96.65	−0.36
Informal votes		2,648	3.35	+0.36
Turnout		79,143	95.62	−1.50
Two-party-preferred result
Liberal	Alan Cadman	53,432	69.85	−4.47
Labor	Anthony Ellard	23,063	30.15	+4.47
Liberal hold		Swing	−4.47	

=== New England ===
This section is an excerpt from Electoral results for the Division of New England § 1998

1998 Australian federal election: New England
Party	Candidate	Votes	%	±%
National	Stuart St. Clair	21,299	31.11	−29.39
Labor	Pat Dixon	15,733	22.98	−1.88
Liberal	Peter Monley	11,261	16.45	+16.45
One Nation	Victor Weare	9,288	13.57	+13.57
Independent	Graham Nuttall	6,202	9.06	+9.06
Democrats	Rebekah Grindlay	1,466	2.14	−6.71
Greens	James Cronin	1,460	2.13	+2.13
Christian Democrats	Oriel Pearce	1,143	1.67	+1.67
Independent	David Morton	449	0.66	+0.66
Natural Law	Frances Letters	162	0.24	−0.82
Total formal votes		68,463	96.38	−1.33
Informal votes		2,573	3.62	+1.33
Turnout		71,036	95.18	−0.91
Two-party-preferred result
National	Stuart St. Clair	43,086	62.93	−6.25
Labor	Pat Dixon	25,377	37.07	+6.25
National hold		Swing	−6.25	

=== Newcastle ===
This section is an excerpt from Electoral results for the Division of Newcastle § 1998

1998 Newcastle supplementary election
Party	Candidate	Votes	%	±%
Labor	Allan Morris	31,441	48.21	−1.94
One Nation	Kate Taylor	10,466	16.05	+16.05
Greens	Carrie Jacobi	5,965	9.15	+0.42
Democrats	Stephen Bisgrove	5,607	8.60	−1.29
Independent	Ivan Welsh	4,398	6.74	+6.74
Independent	Harry Criticos	2,718	4.17	+4.17
Christian Democrats	Greg Budworth	1,798	2.76	+2.76
Progressive Labour	Harry Williams	1,131	1.73	+1.73
Independent	Peter Boyd	757	1.16	+1.16
Democratic Socialist	Geoff Payne	662	1.01	+1.01
Citizens Electoral Council	Tony King	280	0.43	+0.43
Total formal votes		65,223	95.12	−2.04
Informal votes		3,347	4.88	+2.04
Turnout		68,570	88.37	−8.40
Two-candidate-preferred result
Labor	Allan Morris	43,917	67.33	+6.14
Greens	Carrie Jacobi	21,306	32.67	+32.67
Labor hold		Swing	+6.14	

=== North Sydney ===
This section is an excerpt from Electoral results for the Division of North Sydney § 1998

1998 Australian federal election: North Sydney
Party	Candidate	Votes	%	±%
Liberal	Joe Hockey	42,887	54.32	−2.97
Labor	Julie Owens	20,403	25.84	+0.57
Democrats	Anthony Spain	5,726	7.25	−2.72
Unity	Henry Pong	3,727	4.72	+4.72
Greens	Andrew Woodroffe	3,106	3.93	+0.12
One Nation	John Hockley	2,270	2.88	+2.88
Christian Democrats	Roger Bourne	698	0.88	+0.88
Natural Law	Glenn Russell	136	0.17	+0.17
Total formal votes		78,953	96.72	−0.73
Informal votes		2,676	3.28	+0.73
Turnout		81,629	93.09	−2.04
Two-party-preferred result
Liberal	Joe Hockey	49,124	62.22	−3.34
Labor	Julie Owens	29,829	37.78	+3.34
Liberal hold		Swing	−3.34	

=== Page ===
This section is an excerpt from Electoral results for the Division of Page § 1998

1998 Australian federal election: Page
Party	Candidate	Votes	%	±%
National	Ian Causley	31,313	41.76	+5.09
Labor	Joy Mathews	26,548	35.40	−2.63
One Nation	Warren Wenban	8,473	11.30	+11.30
Greens	Nicole Rogers	3,460	4.61	+0.71
Democrats	Peter Wrightson	2,162	2.88	−0.42
Independent	Doug Behn	1,498	2.00	+2.00
Christian Democrats	Graham Clausen	1,133	1.51	+0.04
Democratic Socialist	Kath O'Driscoll	402	0.54	+0.54
Total formal votes		74,989	97.35	−0.70
Informal votes		2,043	2.65	+0.70
Turnout		77,032	95.99	−0.59
Two-party-preferred result
National	Ian Causley	39,265	52.36	−1.95
Labor	Joy Mathews	35,724	47.64	+1.95
National hold		Swing	−1.95	

=== Parkes ===
This section is an excerpt from Electoral results for the Division of Parkes § 1998

1998 Australian federal election: Parkes
Party	Candidate	Votes	%	±%
Labor	Barry Brebner	26,070	35.59	−2.60
National	Tony Lawler	20,791	28.38	−22.83
One Nation	Donald McNaught	9,230	12.60	+12.60
Independent	Robert Wilson	8,657	11.82	+11.82
Liberal	Scott MacDougall	7,261	9.91	+9.91
Democrats	David Burton	1,246	1.70	−0.93
Total formal votes		73,255	97.01	−0.11
Informal votes		2,257	2.99	+0.11
Turnout		75,512	94.88	−0.98
Two-party-preferred result
National	Tony Lawler	39,638	54.11	−2.39
Labor	Barry Brebner	33,617	45.89	+2.39
National hold		Swing	−2.39	

=== Parramatta ===
This section is an excerpt from Electoral results for the Division of Parramatta § 1998

1998 Australian federal election: Parramatta
Party	Candidate	Votes	%	±%
Liberal	Ross Cameron	31,060	43.64	−4.01
Labor	Paul Elliott	27,521	38.67	−0.76
One Nation	Ian Hale	4,495	6.32	+6.32
Unity	Matthew Wong	3,073	4.32	+4.32
Democrats	Peter Mulligan	2,033	2.86	−2.58
Greens	Peter Wright	1,195	1.68	+1.68
Christian Democrats	Dee Jonsson	899	1.26	−0.22
Independent	Tina Schembri	707	0.99	+0.99
Natural Law	John Cogger	108	0.15	−0.92
Republican	Peter Consandine	79	0.11	+0.11
Total formal votes		71,170	95.19	−0.96
Informal votes		3,600	4.81	+0.96
Turnout		74,770	94.89	−1.51
Two-party-preferred result
Liberal	Ross Cameron	36,346	51.07	−2.80
Labor	Paul Elliott	34,824	48.93	+2.80
Liberal hold		Swing	−2.80	

=== Paterson ===
This section is an excerpt from Electoral results for the Division of Paterson § 1998

1998 Australian federal election: Paterson
Party	Candidate	Votes	%	±%
Labor	Bob Horne	33,066	43.13	−0.22
Liberal	Bob Baldwin	31,212	40.71	−4.96
One Nation	Paul Fuller	6,355	8.29	+8.29
Greens	Jan Davis	1,577	2.06	−1.49
Democrats	Geoffrey Rutledge	1,467	1.91	−3.08
Christian Democrats	David Murray	957	1.25	−1.20
Citizens Electoral Council	Anthony King	666	0.87	+0.87
Independent	Michelle Moffat	608	0.79	+0.79
Independent	Andrew Buchan	448	0.58	+0.58
Democratic Socialist	Alison Dellit	164	0.21	+0.21
Independent	Paul Unger	145	0.19	+0.19
Total formal votes		76,665	96.67	−1.07
Informal votes		2,643	3.33	+1.07
Turnout		79,308	96.69	−0.66
Two-party-preferred result
Labor	Bob Horne	39,268	51.22	+1.65
Liberal	Bob Baldwin	37,397	48.78	−1.65
Labor gain from Liberal		Swing	+1.65	

=== Prospect ===
This section is an excerpt from Electoral results for the Division of Prospect § 1998

1998 Australian federal election: Prospect
Party	Candidate	Votes	%	±%
Labor	Janice Crosio	41,310	59.54	+2.86
Liberal	Nahid Aziz	15,965	23.01	−8.97
One Nation	John Hutchinson	5,199	7.49	+7.49
Democrats	Manny Poularas	3,405	4.91	−5.11
Unity	Somchai Tongsumrith	2,199	3.17	+3.17
Greens	Chris Harris	1,074	1.55	+1.55
Natural Law	Linda Cogger	235	0.34	−0.99
Total formal votes		69,387	93.52	−0.71
Informal votes		4,806	6.48	+0.71
Turnout		74,193	95.08	−1.19
Two-party-preferred result
Labor	Janice Crosio	48,371	69.71	+5.81
Liberal	Nahid Aziz	21,016	30.29	−5.81
Labor hold		Swing	+5.81	

=== Reid ===
This section is an excerpt from Electoral results for the Division of Reid § 1998

1998 Australian federal election: Reid
Party	Candidate	Votes	%	±%
Labor	Laurie Ferguson	41,162	57.56	+0.41
Liberal	Alma Freame	15,637	21.87	−12.67
One Nation	Shane O'Connor	4,477	6.26	+6.26
Unity	Penny Tongsumrith	4,045	5.66	+5.66
Christian Democrats	John Ananin	2,544	3.56	+3.56
Democrats	David Poularas	2,052	2.87	−4.08
Greens	Jamie Thomson	1,293	1.81	+1.81
Democratic Socialist	Rupen Savoulian	302	0.42	+0.42
Total formal votes		71,512	92.90	−1.75
Informal votes		5,468	7.10	+1.75
Turnout		76,980	93.16	−3.15
Two-party-preferred result
Labor	Laurie Ferguson	51,233	71.64	+10.26
Liberal	Alma Freame	20,279	28.36	−10.26
Labor hold		Swing	+10.26	

=== Richmond ===
This section is an excerpt from Electoral results for the Division of Richmond § 1998

1998 Australian federal election: Richmond
Party	Candidate	Votes	%	±%
National	Larry Anthony	32,645	40.16	+4.73
Labor	Neville Newell	31,129	38.30	+3.66
One Nation	John Penhaligon	8,278	10.18	+10.18
Greens	Tom Tabart	4,323	5.32	+0.06
Democrats	Peter Cullen	2,305	2.84	−2.58
Independent	Alan DeVendra	1,662	2.04	+2.04
Independent	Leo Piek	621	0.76	+0.76
Natural Law	Helen Patterson	320	0.39	+0.39
Total formal votes		81,283	97.28	−0.63
Informal votes		2,271	2.72	+0.63
Turnout		83,554	94.95	−1.06
Two-party-preferred result
National	Larry Anthony	41,270	50.77	−5.98
Labor	Neville Newell	40,013	49.23	+5.98
National hold		Swing	−5.98	

=== Riverina ===
This section is an excerpt from Electoral results for the Division of Riverina § 1998

1998 Australian federal election: Riverina
Party	Candidate	Votes	%	±%
National	Kay Hull	27,060	36.39	−29.58
Labor	Peter Hargreaves	19,234	25.87	−0.33
Liberal	David Kibbey	15,942	21.44	+21.44
One Nation	David Barton	9,129	12.28	+12.28
Democrats	Rosemary Gillies	1,770	2.38	−1.63
Independent	Denis Collins	1,218	1.64	+1.64
Total formal votes		74,353	97.05	+0.28
Informal votes		2,257	2.95	−0.28
Turnout		76,610	95.91	−1.11
Two-party-preferred result
National	Kay Hull	48,552	65.30	−5.71
Labor	Peter Hargreaves	25,801	34.70	+5.71
National hold		Swing	−5.71	

=== Robertson ===
This section is an excerpt from Electoral results for the Division of Robertson § 1998

1998 Australian federal election: Robertson
Party	Candidate	Votes	%	±%
Liberal	Jim Lloyd	32,963	43.90	−2.89
Labor	Belinda Neal	29,917	39.84	+0.54
One Nation	Kevin Glancy	6,940	9.24	+9.24
Democrats	Andrew Penfold	3,303	4.40	−2.89
Greens	Ian McKenzie	1,598	2.13	+2.13
Unity	Marie Ashburn	364	0.48	+0.48
Total formal votes		75,085	97.09	−0.10
Informal votes		2,254	2.91	+0.10
Turnout		77,339	95.92	−1.16
Two-party-preferred result
Liberal	Jim Lloyd	39,051	52.01	−1.56
Labor	Belinda Neal	36,034	47.99	+1.56
Liberal hold		Swing	−1.56	

=== Shortland ===
This section is an excerpt from Electoral results for the Division of Shortland § 1998

1998 Australian federal election: Shortland
Party	Candidate	Votes	%	±%
Labor	Jill Hall	38,004	51.78	+0.90
Liberal	Peter Craig	20,733	28.25	−6.24
One Nation	Ron Gardnir	7,499	10.22	+10.22
Greens	Rebecca Moroney	2,681	3.65	−0.66
Democrats	Aysha Pollnitz	2,605	3.55	−3.37
Independent	Ivan Welsh	1,878	2.56	+2.56
Total formal votes		73,400	97.13	−0.06
Informal votes		2,167	2.87	+0.06
Turnout		75,567	96.23	−1.04
Two-party-preferred result
Labor	Jill Hall	46,100	62.81	+4.66
Liberal	Peter Craig	27,300	37.19	−4.66
Labor hold		Swing	+4.66	

=== Sydney ===
This section is an excerpt from Electoral results for the Division of Sydney § 1998

1998 Australian federal election: Sydney
Party	Candidate	Votes	%	±%
Labor	Tanya Plibersek	38,920	51.59	+3.21
Liberal	Bruce Morrow	20,899	27.70	+0.09
Democrats	Ben Hanson	5,092	6.75	−2.00
Greens	Jenny Ryde	4,683	6.21	+0.42
One Nation	Warren Hensley	1,917	2.54	+2.54
Unity	Flavia Abdurahman	1,676	2.22	+2.22
Independent	Jenny Munro	591	0.78	+0.78
Democratic Socialist	John Percy	568	0.75	+0.75
No Aircraft Noise	Anna Lunsmann	538	0.71	−6.10
	Denis Doherty	441	0.58	+0.58
Natural Law	Michael Lippmann	112	0.15	−0.18
Total formal votes		75,437	95.77	+0.29
Informal votes		3,331	4.23	−0.29
Turnout		78,768	90.25	−2.60
Two-party-preferred result
Labor	Tanya Plibersek	50,463	66.89	+3.09
Liberal	Bruce Morrow	24,974	33.11	−3.09
Labor hold		Swing	+3.09	

=== Throsby ===
This section is an excerpt from Electoral results for the Division of Throwsby § 1998

1998 Australian federal election: Throsby
Party	Candidate	Votes	%	±%
Labor	Colin Hollis	44,468	61.27	+0.43
Liberal	Charlie Mifsud	12,538	17.27	−4.43
One Nation	Dan Orr	8,267	11.39	+11.39
Democrats	Ann Barry	2,751	3.79	−4.69
Greens	Karla Sperling	2,230	3.07	−2.07
Christian Democrats	Brian Hughes	1,949	2.69	−1.16
Socialist Equality	Peter Stavropoulos	379	0.52	+0.52
Total formal votes		72,582	96.10	−0.03
Informal votes		2,948	3.90	+0.03
Turnout		75,530	95.75	−1.34
Two-party-preferred result
Labor	Colin Hollis	52,593	72.46	+2.84
Liberal	Charlie Mifsud	19,989	27.54	−2.84
Labor hold		Swing	+2.84	

=== Warringah ===
This section is an excerpt from Electoral results for the Division of Warringah § 1998

1998 Australian federal election: Warringah
Party	Candidate	Votes	%	±%
Liberal	Tony Abbott	39,753	55.46	−2.25
Labor	Julie Heraghty	19,730	27.53	+0.88
Democrats	Brett Paterson	4,271	5.96	−0.77
One Nation	Janne Lindrum	3,873	5.40	+5.40
Greens	Keelah Lam	2,970	4.14	−0.71
Christian Democrats	Heath Johnstone	725	1.01	+1.01
Natural Law	Ines Judd	204	0.28	−0.09
Abolish Child Support	Tony Allen	150	0.21	+0.21
Total formal votes		71,676	96.93	−0.18
Informal votes		2,273	3.07	+0.18
Turnout		73,949	93.60	−2.51
Two-party-preferred result
Liberal	Tony Abbott	45,145	62.98	−2.33
Labor	Julie Heraghty	26,531	37.02	+2.33
Liberal hold		Swing	−2.33	

=== Watson ===
This section is an excerpt from Electoral results for the Division of Watson § 1998

1998 Australian federal election: Watson
Party	Candidate	Votes	%	±%
Labor	Leo McLeay	41,159	56.85	+1.74
Liberal	Joe Rafferty	19,461	26.88	−6.53
Unity	Zahir Abdurahman	3,838	5.30	+5.30
One Nation	Claire Wright	3,392	4.68	+4.68
Democrats	Amelia Gavagnin Newman	2,309	3.19	−4.69
Christian Democrats	Murray Peterson	1,176	1.62	−1.98
Greens	Caroline Toomey	1,070	1.48	+1.48
Total formal votes		72,405	95.02	+0.14
Informal votes		3,791	4.98	−0.14
Turnout		76,196	93.41	−2.63
Two-party-preferred result
Labor	Leo McLeay	48,849	67.47	+5.79
Liberal	Joe Rafferty	23,556	32.53	−5.79
Labor hold		Swing	+5.79	

=== Wentworth ===
This section is an excerpt from Electoral results for the Division of Wentworth § 1998

1998 Australian federal election: Wentworth
Party	Candidate	Votes	%	±%
Liberal	Andrew Thomson	36,348	49.75	−2.25
Labor	Paul Pearce	24,198	33.12	+1.32
Democrats	Margaret Collings	4,470	6.12	−2.55
Greens	Tom McLoughlin	3,592	4.92	−1.04
One Nation	Waverney Ford	2,004	2.74	+2.74
Unity	Alan Jacobs	1,978	2.71	+2.71
Natural Law	Dezi Koster	467	0.64	+0.34
Total formal votes		73,057	96.35	−0.20
Informal votes		2,771	3.65	+0.20
Turnout		75,828	91.95	−3.46
Two-party-preferred result
Liberal	Andrew Thomson	41,147	56.32	−1.51
Labor	Paul Pearce	31,910	43.68	+1.51
Liberal hold		Swing	−1.51	

=== Werriwa ===
This section is an excerpt from Electoral results for the Division of Werriwa § 1998

1998 Australian federal election: Werriwa
Party	Candidate	Votes	%	±%
Labor	Mark Latham	37,106	50.58	+2.69
Liberal	Andrew Thorn	21,251	28.97	−4.74
One Nation	John Hyslop	8,440	11.51	+11.51
Democrats	James Cockayne	2,594	3.54	−2.90
Greens	Vicki Kearney	1,605	2.19	+2.19
Independent	Sharynne Freeman	1,260	1.72	+1.72
Unity	Ibrahim Peck	1,099	1.50	+1.50
Total formal votes		73,355	95.12	+0.20
Informal votes		3,766	4.88	−0.20
Turnout		77,121	94.54	−1.28
Two-party-preferred result
Labor	Mark Latham	45,974	62.67	+6.46
Liberal	Andrew Thorn	27,381	37.33	−6.46
Labor hold		Swing	+6.46	

== See also ==
- Results of the 1998 Australian federal election (House of Representatives)
- Members of the Australian House of Representatives, 1998–2001
