= Electoral results for the Division of Parkes =

Australian division election results

This is a list of electoral results for the Division of Parkes in Australian federal elections from the division's creation in 1984 until the present.

== Members ==
Member	Party	Term
Michael Cobb	National	1984–1998
Tony Lawler	National	1998–2001
John Cobb	National	2001–2007
Mark Coulton	National	2007–2025
Jamie Chaffey	National	2025–present

== Election results ==
=== Elections in the 2020s ===
==== 2025 ====
2025 Australian federal election: Parkes
Party	Candidate	Votes	%	±%
National	Jamie Chaffey	41,912	39.96	−9.02
Labor	Nathan Fell	20,630	19.67	+0.14
One Nation	Mark Carter	14,320	13.65	+5.93
Shooters, Fishers, Farmers	Stephen Pope	6,776	6.46	+4.36
Greens	Trish Frail	6,404	6.11	+1.37
Libertarian	Sally Edwards	3,885	3.70	−2.66
Indigenous-Aboriginal	Bob Wilson	3,117	2.97	−1.21
Family First	Maurice Davey	2,690	2.56	+2.56
Independent	Stuart Howe	2,597	2.48	+0.44
Trumpet of Patriots	Petrus Van Der Steen	2,556	2.44	+2.44
Total formal votes		104,887	89.85	−2.43
Informal votes		11,855	10.15	+2.43
Turnout		116,742	89.22	+0.72
Two-party-preferred result
National	Jamie Chaffey	66,047	62.97	−5.18
Labor	Nathan Fell	38,840	37.03	+5.18
National hold		Swing	−5.18	

==== 2022 ====
2022 Australian federal election: Parkes
Party	Candidate	Votes	%	±%
National	Mark Coulton	43,931	49.32	−1.44
Labor	Jack Ayoub	18,009	20.22	−3.34
One Nation	Deborah Swinbourn	6,662	7.48	+7.48
Liberal Democrats	Peter Rothwell	5,723	6.42	−1.64
Indigenous-Aboriginal	Derek Hardman	4,466	5.01	+5.01
Greens	Trish Frail	4,214	4.73	+0.56
United Australia	Petrus Van Der Steen	2,372	2.66	−3.63
Independent	Stuart Howe	2,191	2.46	+2.46
Informed Medical Options	Benjamin Fox	1,512	1.70	+1.70
Total formal votes		89,080	92.31	−1.83
Informal votes		7,421	7.69	+1.83
Turnout		96,501	88.53	−2.60
Two-party-preferred result
National	Mark Coulton	60,433	67.84	+0.93
Labor	Jack Ayoub	28,647	32.16	−0.93
National hold		Swing	+0.93	

Alluvial diagram for preference flows in the seat of Parkes in the 2022 federal election. indicates at what stage the winning candidate had over 50% of the votes and was declared the winner.

=== Elections in the 2010s ===
==== 2019 ====
2019 Australian federal election: Parkes
Party	Candidate	Votes	%	±%
National	Mark Coulton	47,692	50.76	−7.89
Labor	Jack Ayoub	22,135	23.56	−5.01
Liberal Democrats	Daniel Jones	7,568	8.06	+8.06
Independent	Will Landers	6,730	7.16	+7.16
United Australia	Petrus van der Steen	5,906	6.29	+6.29
Greens	David Paull	3,921	4.17	−2.08
Total formal votes		93,952	94.14	−0.62
Informal votes		5,847	5.86	+0.62
Turnout		99,799	91.13	−0.82
Two-party-preferred result
National	Mark Coulton	62,859	66.91	+1.81
Labor	Jack Ayoub	31,093	33.09	−1.81
National hold		Swing	+1.81	

==== 2016 ====
2016 Australian federal election: Parkes
Party	Candidate	Votes	%	±%
National	Mark Coulton	54,869	58.65	+2.89
Labor	Kate Stewart	26,728	28.57	+6.08
Greens	Matt Parmeter	5,851	6.25	+1.52
Christian Democrats	Glen Ryan	3,950	4.22	+1.90
Online Direct Democracy	Philip Ayton	2,149	2.30	+2.30
Total formal votes		93,547	94.76	+1.31
Informal votes		5,170	5.24	−1.31
Turnout		98,717	91.95	−3.29
Two-party-preferred result
National	Mark Coulton	60,901	65.10	−4.87
Labor	Kate Stewart	32,646	34.90	+4.87
National hold		Swing	−4.87	

==== 2013 ====
2013 Australian federal election: Parkes
Party	Candidate	Votes	%	±%
National	Mark Coulton	58,020	64.01	+4.78
Labor	Brendan Byron	18,850	20.80	−0.46
Palmer United	Neil Gorman	6,724	7.42	+7.42
Greens	Matt Parmeter	4,691	5.18	−0.42
Christian Democrats	Michelle Ryan	2,354	2.60	+2.60
Total formal votes		90,639	94.26	−0.72
Informal votes		5,519	5.74	+0.72
Turnout		96,158	94.36	+0.04
Two-party-preferred result
National	Mark Coulton	65,575	72.35	+3.49
Labor	Brendan Byron	25,064	27.65	−3.49
National hold		Swing	+3.49	

==== 2010 ====
2010 Australian federal election: Parkes
Party	Candidate	Votes	%	±%
National	Mark Coulton	53,154	59.23	+11.07
Labor	Andrew Brooks	19,081	21.26	−3.75
Independent	John Clements	9,146	10.19	+10.19
Greens	Matt Parmeter	5,028	5.60	+2.68
Independent	Mick Colless	3,326	3.71	+3.71
Total formal votes		89,735	94.98	−0.94
Informal votes		4,745	5.02	+0.94
Turnout		94,480	94.32	−2.20
Two-party-preferred result
National	Mark Coulton	61,789	68.86	+5.19
Labor	Andrew Brooks	27,946	31.14	−5.19
National hold		Swing	+5.19	

=== Elections in the 2000s ===
==== 2007 ====
2007 Australian federal election: Parkes
Party	Candidate	Votes	%	±%
National	Mark Coulton	38,574	46.77	−15.02
Labor	Margaret Patriarca	20,922	25.37	+0.72
Independent	Tim Horan	17,098	20.73	+20.73
Greens	Matt Parmeter	2,496	3.03	−1.24
Independent	Bruce Haigh	2,153	2.61	−1.21
Climate Change	Michael Kiely	939	1.14	+1.14
Citizens Electoral Council	Richard Stringer	287	0.35	−0.75
Total formal votes		82,469	95.80	−0.55
Informal votes		3,617	4.20	+0.55
Turnout		86,086	95.97	−0.75
Two-party-preferred result
National	Mark Coulton	51,985	63.04	−4.52
Labor	Margaret Patriarca	30,484	36.96	+4.52
National hold		Swing	−4.52	

==== 2004 ====
2004 Australian federal election: Parkes
Party	Candidate	Votes	%	±%
National	John Cobb	45,569	60.49	+9.39
Labor	Joe Knagge	23,568	31.28	−1.93
Independent	Michael John Boland	2,904	3.85	+3.85
Greens	Terrance Loughlin	2,577	3.42	+0.89
Citizens Electoral Council	Makere Rangihaeata	717	0.95	+0.95
Total formal votes		75,335	96.05	−0.45
Informal votes		3,101	3.95	+0.45
Turnout		78,436	95.69	+0.12
Two-party-preferred result
National	John Cobb	48,512	64.40	+5.66
Labor	Joe Knagge	26,823	35.60	−5.66
National hold		Swing	+5.66	

==== 2001 ====
2001 Australian federal election: Parkes
Party	Candidate	Votes	%	±%
National	John Cobb	39,133	51.10	+21.85
Labor	Joe Knagge	25,429	33.21	−0.64
One Nation	Bob Redfern	7,969	10.41	−2.20
Democrats	Geoff Ward	2,111	2.76	+1.07
Greens	Samantha Dunlop	1,936	2.53	+2.49
Total formal votes		76,578	96.50	−0.42
Informal votes		2,781	3.50	+0.42
Turnout		79,359	96.08	
Two-party-preferred result
National	John Cobb	44,982	58.74	+2.36
Labor	Joe Knagge	31,596	41.26	−2.36
National hold		Swing	+2.36	

=== Elections in the 1990s ===
==== 1998 ====
1998 Australian federal election: Parkes
Party	Candidate	Votes	%	±%
Labor	Barry Brebner	26,070	35.59	−2.60
National	Tony Lawler	20,791	28.38	−22.83
One Nation	Donald McNaught	9,230	12.60	+12.60
Independent	Robert Wilson	8,657	11.82	+11.82
Liberal	Scott MacDougall	7,261	9.91	+9.91
Democrats	David Burton	1,246	1.70	−0.93
Total formal votes		73,255	97.01	−0.11
Informal votes		2,257	2.99	+0.11
Turnout		75,512	94.88	−0.98
Two-party-preferred result
National	Tony Lawler	39,638	54.11	−2.39
Labor	Barry Brebner	33,617	45.89	+2.39
National hold		Swing	−2.39	

==== 1996 ====
1996 Australian federal election: Parkes
Party	Candidate	Votes	%	±%
National	Michael Cobb	38,264	51.21	+3.71
Labor	Barry Brebner	28,530	38.18	−7.33
Democrats	Ken Graham	1,965	2.63	−0.48
Independent	Edna Cook	1,758	2.35	+2.35
Women's Party	Dianne Decker	1,708	2.29	+2.29
AAFI	Vivian Desmond	1,528	2.08	+2.05
Natural Law	David McLennan	964	1.29	+0.33
Total formal votes		74,717	97.12	−0.41
Informal votes		2,218	2.88	+0.41
Turnout		76,935	95.86	+0.30
Two-party-preferred result
National	Michael Cobb	42,100	56.50	+5.96
Labor	Barry Brebner	32,418	43.50	−5.96
National hold		Swing	+5.96	

==== 1993 ====
1993 Australian federal election: Parkes
Party	Candidate	Votes	%	±%
National	Michael Cobb	35,649	47.50	−2.81
Labor	Barry Brebner	34,160	45.52	+3.49
Democrats	Noel Plumb	2,333	3.11	−3.16
Independent	Terrence Seton	2,183	2.91	+2.91
Natural Law	David McLennan	722	0.96	+0.96
Total formal votes		75,047	97.53	+0.60
Informal votes		1,904	2.47	−0.60
Turnout		76,951	95.56	
Two-party-preferred result
National	Michael Cobb	37,907	50.53	−3.80
Labor	Barry Brebner	37,105	49.47	+3.80
National hold		Swing	−3.80	

==== 1990 ====
1990 Australian federal election: Parkes
Party	Candidate	Votes	%	±%
National	Michael Cobb	35,910	55.5	+5.0
Labor	Ray Leslie	22,599	34.9	−1.7
Democrats	Gloria Collison	6,165	9.5	+5.9
Total formal votes		64,674	97.0	
Informal votes		1,972	3.0	
Turnout		66,646	95.5	
Two-party-preferred result
National	Michael Cobb	39,252	60.7	−0.1
Labor	Ray Leslie	25,399	39.3	+0.1
National hold		Swing	−0.1	

=== Elections in the 1980s ===
==== 1987 ====
1987 Australian federal election: Parkes
Party	Candidate	Votes	%	±%
National	Michael Cobb	31,433	50.5	+22.3
Labor	Graham Lund	22,773	36.6	−4.1
Independent	Max Murford	5,272	8.5	+8.5
Democrats	Gloria Collison	2,229	3.6	+0.7
Independent	Bill O'Donnell	528	0.8	+0.8
Total formal votes		62,235	96.8	
Informal votes		2,073	3.2	
Turnout		64,308	93.1	
Two-party-preferred result
National	Michael Cobb	37,816	60.8	+4.7
Labor	Graham Lund	24,403	39.2	−4.7
National hold		Swing	+4.7	

==== 1984 ====
1984 Australian federal election: Parkes
Party	Candidate	Votes	%	±%
Labor	James Curran	25,097	40.7	+0.8
National	Michael Cobb	17,407	28.2	−26.9
Liberal	Bruce Rowley	17,327	28.1	+28.1
Democrats	Gloria Collison	1,815	2.9	−1.6
Total formal votes		61,646	95.9	
Informal votes		2,630	4.1	
Turnout		64,276	94.6	
Two-party-preferred result
National	Michael Cobb	34,590	56.1	−1.2
Labor	James Curran	27,051	43.9	+1.2
National notional hold		Swing	−1.2	
