= Electoral results for the Division of Chifley =

Australian division election results

This is a list of electoral results for the Division of Chifley in Australian federal elections from the division's creation in 1969 until the present.

== Members ==
Member	Party	Term
John Armitage	Labor	1969–1983
Russ Gorman	Labor	1983–1984
Roger Price	Labor	1984–2010
Ed Husic	Labor	2010–present

== Election results ==
=== Elections in the 2020s ===
==== 2025 ====
2025 Australian federal election: Chifley
Party	Candidate	Votes	%	±%
Labor	Ed Husic	47,078	52.65	−0.35
Liberal	Allan Green	17,613	19.70	−4.92
Greens	Sukhjinder Singh	8,724	9.76	+4.08
One Nation	Tony Nikolic	5,338	5.97	−0.24
Family First	Jamie Green	5,336	5.97	+5.97
Trumpet of Patriots	Ryan Archer	2,237	2.50	+2.50
Animal Justice	Rohan Laxmanalal	1,569	1.75	+1.75
Independent	Leigh Burns	1,519	1.70	+1.70
Total formal votes		89,414	86.45	−4.66
Informal votes		14,013	13.55	+4.66
Turnout		103,427	88.67	+3.93
Two-party-preferred result
Labor	Ed Husic	62,440	69.83	+6.18
Liberal	Allan Green	26,974	30.17	−6.18
Labor hold		Swing	+6.18	

==== 2022 ====
2022 Australian federal election: Chifley
Party	Candidate	Votes	%	±%
Labor	Ed Husic	51,236	52.72	−1.58
Liberal	Jugandeep Singh	24,046	24.74	−3.18
One Nation	Amit Batish	6,034	6.21	+6.21
Greens	Sujan Selventhiran	5,622	5.78	+0.72
United Australia	Zvetanka Raskov	5,149	5.30	+0.76
Liberal Democrats	Ben Roughley	3,263	3.36	+3.36
Independent	Ammar Khan	1,839	1.89	+0.15
Total formal votes		97,189	91.12	+0.78
Informal votes		9,471	8.88	−0.78
Turnout		106,660	87.95	−2.01
Two-party-preferred result
Labor	Ed Husic	61,682	63.47	+1.10
Liberal	Jugandeep Singh	35,507	36.53	−1.10
Labor hold		Swing	+1.10	

Alluvial diagram for preference flows in the seat of Chifley in the 2022 federal election. The winning candidate got over 50% of first preference votes, so this alluvial diagram is indicative only, and preference flows were not used to determine the final result. The preference flows were used to determine the two-candidate-preferred.

=== Elections in the 2010s ===
==== 2019 ====
2019 Australian federal election: Chifley
Party	Candidate	Votes	%	±%
Labor	Ed Husic	49,418	54.30	−6.79
Liberal	Livingston Chettipally	25,411	27.92	+5.26
Christian Democrats	Josh Green	5,859	6.44	−2.70
Greens	Brent Robertson	4,604	5.06	+0.52
United Australia	Joseph O'Connor	4,133	4.54	+4.54
Independent	Ammar Khan	1,581	1.74	−0.82
Total formal votes		91,006	90.34	−1.32
Informal votes		9,728	9.66	+1.32
Turnout		100,734	89.96	+0.08
Two-party-preferred result
Labor	Ed Husic	56,761	62.37	−6.82
Liberal	Livingston Chettipally	34,245	37.63	+6.82
Labor hold		Swing	−6.82	

==== 2016 ====
2016 Australian federal election: Chifley
Party	Candidate	Votes	%	±%
Labor	Ed Husic	52,278	61.09	+8.39
Liberal	Mohit Kumar	19,394	22.66	−9.16
Christian Democrats	Joshua Green	7,820	9.14	+5.68
Greens	Eliza James	3,883	4.54	+1.88
Independent	Ammar Khan	2,194	2.56	+0.44
Total formal votes		85,569	91.66	+4.95
Informal votes		7,785	8.34	−4.95
Turnout		93,354	89.88	+0.16
Two-party-preferred result
Labor	Ed Husic	59,202	69.19	+8.26
Liberal	Mohit Kumar	26,367	30.81	−8.26
Labor hold		Swing	+8.26	

==== 2013 ====
2013 Australian federal election: Chifley
Party	Candidate	Votes	%	±%
Labor	Ed Husic	43,044	52.30	+0.72
Liberal	Isabelle White	26,479	32.17	+1.85
Palmer United	Christopher Buttel	3,361	4.08	+4.08
Christian Democrats	Dave Vincent	2,862	3.48	−1.58
Greens	Ben Hammond	2,198	2.67	−5.76
Independent	Ammar Khan	1,749	2.13	+2.13
One Nation	Elizabeth Power	1,402	1.70	−0.27
Democratic Labour	Michael Wright	810	0.98	+0.98
Australia First	Alex Norwick	396	0.48	−0.69
Total formal votes		82,301	86.64	−2.20
Informal votes		12,690	13.36	+2.20
Turnout		94,991	92.78	+0.09
Two-party-preferred result
Labor	Ed Husic	49,831	60.55	−1.79
Liberal	Isabelle White	32,470	39.45	+1.79
Labor hold		Swing	−1.79	

==== 2010 ====
2010 Australian federal election: Chifley
Party	Candidate	Votes	%	±%
Labor	Ed Husic	41,456	51.58	−11.60
Liberal	Venus Priest	24,369	30.32	+5.42
Greens	Debbie Robertson	6,776	8.43	+4.72
Christian Democrats	Dave Vincent	4,068	5.06	+1.72
One Nation	Louise Kedwell	1,585	1.97	+0.67
Democrats	Keith Darley	1,174	1.46	+1.46
Australia First	Terry Cooksley	943	1.17	+1.17
Total formal votes		80,371	88.84	−3.25
Informal votes		10,097	11.16	+3.25
Turnout		90,468	92.69	−0.98
Two-party-preferred result
Labor	Ed Husic	50,103	62.34	−7.34
Liberal	Venus Priest	30,268	37.66	+7.34
Labor hold		Swing	−7.34	

=== Elections in the 2000s ===
==== 2007 ====
2007 Australian federal election: Chifley
Party	Candidate	Votes	%	±%
Labor	Roger Price	51,568	64.18	+10.12
Liberal	Jess Diaz	19,092	23.76	−6.62
Greens	John Forrester	2,897	3.61	−1.66
Christian Democrats	Dave Vincent	2,751	3.42	+1.21
One Nation	Louise Kedwell	1,183	1.47	−0.53
Socialist Equality	James Cogan	1,069	1.33	+1.33
Family First	Evan Jewell	1,016	1.26	−0.24
Independent	Wayne Hyland	484	0.60	−0.24
Independent	Amarjit Tanda	288	0.36	+0.36
Total formal votes		80,348	92.01	+2.90
Informal votes		6,976	7.99	−2.90
Turnout		87,324	94.40	+0.55
Two-party-preferred result
Labor	Roger Price	56,776	70.66	+8.69
Liberal	Jess Diaz	23,572	29.34	−8.69
Labor hold		Swing	+8.69	

==== 2004 ====
2004 Australian federal election: Chifley
Party	Candidate	Votes	%	±%
Labor	Roger Price	39,836	55.65	−0.65
Liberal	Costa Asarloglou	20,814	29.08	+3.56
Greens	Debbie Robertson	4,326	6.04	+4.33
Christian Democrats	Dave Vincent	2,653	3.71	+1.21
One Nation	Terry Cooksley	1,579	2.21	−4.01
Family First	Robert Heathcote	1,211	1.69	+1.69
Independent	Wayne Hyland	850	1.19	+0.40
	Graham Rand	315	0.44	+0.44
Total formal votes		71,584	89.90	−0.90
Informal votes		8,043	10.10	+0.90
Turnout		79,627	94.31	+0.10
Two-party-preferred result
Labor	Roger Price	45,084	62.98	−2.31
Liberal	Costa Asarloglou	26,500	37.02	+2.31
Labor hold		Swing	−2.31	

==== 2001 ====
2001 Australian federal election: Chifley
Party	Candidate	Votes	%	±%
Labor	Roger Price	40,203	56.30	−3.48
Liberal	Costa Asarloglou	18,225	25.52	+6.53
One Nation	Joe Damjanovic	4,442	6.22	−4.07
Save the ADI Site	Barbie Bates	2,347	3.29	+3.29
Christian Democrats	Joseph Wyness	1,784	2.50	+0.19
Democrats	S J Clack	1,365	1.91	−2.63
AAFI	Lindsey Butler	1,262	1.77	+1.77
Greens	David Cunningham	1,220	1.71	+0.25
Independent	Wayne Hyland	565	0.79	+0.79
Total formal votes		71,413	90.80	−3.14
Informal votes		7,232	9.20	+3.14
Turnout		78,645	94.93	
Two-party-preferred result
Labor	Roger Price	46,628	65.29	−5.98
Liberal	Costa Asarloglou	24,785	34.71	+5.98
Labor hold		Swing	−5.98	

=== Elections in the 1990s ===
==== 1998 ====
1998 Australian federal election: Chifley
Party	Candidate	Votes	%	±%
Labor	Roger Price	43,496	59.26	+1.30
Liberal	John Coles	14,485	19.73	−7.11
One Nation	Joe Damjanovic	7,400	10.08	+10.08
Democrats	Andrew Owen	3,595	4.90	−4.15
Christian Democrats	Joseph Wyness	1,520	2.07	−0.68
Greens	Robert Nolan	1,014	1.38	+1.38
Unity	Aooe Boyd Pio	969	1.32	+1.32
Independent	Dave Vincent	761	1.04	+1.04
Natural Law	Zahra Razavikashan	162	0.22	−0.66
Total formal votes		73,402	94.11	−0.64
Informal votes		4,597	5.89	+0.64
Turnout		77,999	94.68	−1.37
Two-party-preferred result
Labor	Roger Price	52,037	70.89	+6.36
Liberal	John Coles	21,365	29.11	−6.36
Labor hold		Swing	+6.36	

==== 1996 ====
1996 Australian federal election: Chifley
Party	Candidate	Votes	%	±%
Labor	Roger Price	42,804	57.95	−10.11
Liberal	Jenny Green	19,828	26.85	+6.14
Democrats	Alec Fisher	6,682	9.05	+9.05
Call to Australia	Shirley Grigg	2,033	2.75	+2.75
Independent	Andrew Owen	1,858	2.52	+2.52
Natural Law	Louise Hargreaves	653	0.88	+0.88
Total formal votes		73,858	94.74	−0.50
Informal votes		4,098	5.26	+0.50
Turnout		77,956	96.04	+0.63
Two-party-preferred result
Labor	Roger Price	47,513	64.54	−8.04
Liberal	Jenny Green	26,109	35.46	+8.04
Labor hold		Swing	−8.04	

==== 1993 ====
1993 Australian federal election: Chifley
Party	Candidate	Votes	%	±%
Labor	Roger Price	47,123	68.06	+7.93
Liberal	Jennifer Mackenzie	14,335	20.71	−3.33
Independent EFF	Joe Bryant	4,656	6.73	+6.68
Independent	F Ivor	2,014	2.91	+2.80
Independent	Tom Kumar	622	0.90	+0.90
	Yabu Bilyana	484	0.70	+0.70
Total formal votes		69,234	95.24	−0.42
Informal votes		3,460	4.76	+0.42
Turnout		72,694	95.42	
Two-party-preferred result
Labor	Roger Price	50,214	72.57	+1.82
Liberal	Jennifer Mackenzie	18,976	27.43	−1.82
Labor hold		Swing	+1.82	

==== 1990 ====
1990 Australian federal election: Chifley
Party	Candidate	Votes	%	±%
Labor	Roger Price	40,085	59.6	−4.7
Liberal	Darren Condon	16,772	25.0	−2.3
Democrats	Nigel Lovell	8,569	12.7	+5.8
Call to Australia	Bill Bird	1,789	2.7	+2.7
Total formal votes		67,215	95.9	
Informal votes		2,894	4.1	
Turnout		70,109	95.2	
Two-party-preferred result
Labor	Roger Price	47,061	70.1	+1.0
Liberal	Darren Condon	20,048	29.9	−1.0
Labor hold		Swing	+1.0	

=== Elections in the 1980s ===
==== 1987 ====
1987 Australian federal election: Chifley
Party	Candidate	Votes	%	±%
Labor	Roger Price	38,683	64.3	−2.3
Liberal	Paul Conlon	16,414	27.3	−0.3
Democrats	Philip Goldhagen	4,128	6.9	+1.1
Independent	Cheryl Crisp	960	1.6	+1.6
Total formal votes		60,185	92.7	
Informal votes		4,706	7.3	
Turnout		64,891	94.0	
Two-party-preferred result
Labor	Roger Price	41,586	69.1	−0.4
Liberal	Paul Conlon	18,596	30.9	+0.4
Labor hold		Swing	−0.4	

==== 1984 ====
1984 Australian federal election: Chifley
Party	Candidate	Votes	%	±%
Labor	Roger Price	34,034	66.6	+13.5
Liberal	Ken Jessup	14,115	27.6	−3.3
Democrats	Dominic Fanning	2,951	5.8	+2.8
Total formal votes		51,100	89.0	
Informal votes		6,316	11.0	
Turnout		57,416	93.3	
Two-party-preferred result
Labor	Roger Price	35,503	69.5	+5.5
Liberal	Ken Jessup	15,595	30.5	−5.5
Labor hold		Swing	+5.5	

==== 1983 ====
1983 Australian federal election: Chifley
Party	Candidate	Votes	%	±%
Labor	Russ Gorman	44,419	61.2	−4.0
Liberal	Edna Mitchell	16,565	22.8	−4.2
Socialist Workers	Christine Broi	4,556	6.3	+6.3
Independent	Jonathan Cooper	3,744	5.2	+5.2
Democrats	Frances Jones	2,187	3.0	−0.6
Independent	Jane Smith/New	1,114	1.5	+1.5
Total formal votes		72,586	95.8	
Informal votes		3,169	4.2	
Turnout		75,755	95.0	
Two-party-preferred result
Labor	Russ Gorman	52,525	72.4	+2.3
Liberal	Edna Mitchell	20,061	27.6	−2.3
Labor hold		Swing	+2.3	

==== 1980 ====
1980 Australian federal election: Chifley
Party	Candidate	Votes	%	±%
Labor	John Armitage	46,289	65.2	+5.2
Liberal	Philip Daly	19,199	27.0	−1.4
Democrats	Keith Watson	2,539	3.6	−6.2
Socialist Labour	Terence Cook	1,918	2.7	+2.7
Communist	Geoffrey Evans	1,091	1.5	−1.4
Total formal votes		71,036	94.1	
Informal votes		2,848	3.9	
Turnout		73,884	94.7	
Two-party-preferred result
Labor	John Armitage		70.1	+2.6
Liberal	Philip Daly		29.9	−2.6
Labor hold		Swing	+2.6	

=== Elections in the 1970s ===
==== 1977 ====
1977 Australian federal election: Chifley
Party	Candidate	Votes	%	±%
Labor	John Armitage	39,168	60.0	−3.5
Liberal	Richard Taylor	17,745	27.2	−9.3
Democrats	Alfred Tozer	6,414	9.8	+9.8
Communist	Jack Mundey	1,910	2.9	+2.9
Total formal votes		65,237	96.6	
Informal votes		2,307	3.4	
Turnout		67,544	95.9	
Two-party-preferred result
Labor	John Armitage		67.5	+4.0
Liberal	Richard Taylor		38.5	−4.0
Labor hold		Swing	+4.0	

==== 1975 ====
1975 Australian federal election: Chifley
Party	Candidate	Votes	%	±%
Labor	John Armitage	48,767	61.8	−9.0
Liberal	Shirley Sookee	30,206	38.2	+11.8
Total formal votes		78,973	96.6	
Informal votes		2,773	3.4	
Turnout		81,746	95.9	
Labor hold		Swing	−10.7	

==== 1974 ====
1974 Australian federal election: Chifley
Party	Candidate	Votes	%	±%
Labor	John Armitage	52,400	70.8	−0.7
Liberal	Patricia Robinson	19,502	26.4	+3.4
Australia	Phillip Lambert	2,090	2.8	+2.8
Total formal votes		73,992	97.8	
Informal votes		1,640	2.2	
Turnout		75,632	96.9	
Two-party-preferred result
Labor	John Armitage		72.5	−0.1
Liberal	Patricia Robinson		27.5	+0.1
Labor hold		Swing	−0.1	

==== 1972 ====
1972 Australian federal election: Chifley
Party	Candidate	Votes	%	±%
Labor	John Armitage	45,656	71.5	+9.6
Liberal	Alan Calaby	14,720	23.0	−3.3
Democratic Labor	Francesco Rea	3,504	5.5	+2.2
Total formal votes		63,880	97.3	
Informal votes		1,758	2.7	
Turnout		65,638	95.3	
Two-party-preferred result
Labor	John Armitage		72.6	+5.8
Liberal	Alan Calaby		27.4	−5.8
Labor hold		Swing	+5.8	

=== Elections in the 1960s ===
==== 1969 ====
1969 Australian federal election: Chifley
Party	Candidate	Votes	%	±%
Labor	John Armitage	31,133	61.9	+16.2
Liberal	Milovan Kovjanic	13,234	26.3	−18.5
Independent	Victor Corcoran	4,283	8.5	+8.5
Democratic Labor	Stan Aster-Stater	1,651	3.3	−0.7
Total formal votes		50,301	96.9	
Informal votes		1,607	3.1	
Turnout		51,908	94.7	
Two-party-preferred result
Labor	John Armitage		66.8	+16.6
Liberal	Milovan Kovjanic		33.2	−16.6
Labor notional hold		Swing	+16.6	
