= Electoral results for the Division of Greenway =

Australian division election results

This is a list of electoral results for the Division of Greenway in Australian federal elections from the division's creation in 1984 until the present.

== Members ==
Member	Party	Term
Russ Gorman	Labor	1984–1996
Frank Mossfield	Labor	1996–2004
Louise Markus	Liberal	2004–2010
Michelle Rowland	Labor	2010–present

== Election results ==
=== Elections in the 2020s ===
==== 2025 ====
2025 Australian federal election: Greenway
Party	Candidate	Votes	%	±%
Independent	Robert Stuckey			
Libertarian	Mark Rex			
Greens	Palaniappan Subramanian			
Liberal	Rattan Virk			
Labor	Michelle Rowland			
Trumpet of Patriots	Justin Mulligan			
One Nation	Edwin Swann			
Total formal votes				
Informal votes				
Turnout				

==== 2022 ====
2022 Australian federal election: Greenway
Party	Candidate	Votes	%	±%
Labor	Michelle Rowland	48,551	48.29	+2.32
Liberal	Pradeep Pathi	29,932	29.77	−10.81
Greens	Damien Atkins	7,086	7.05	+1.55
United Australia	Mark Rex	4,359	4.34	+1.35
Australia One	Riccardo Bosi	3,272	3.25	+3.25
Liberal Democrats	Adam Kachwalla	3,014	3.00	+3.00
One Nation	Rick Turner	2,710	2.70	+2.70
Independent	Love Nanda	1,615	1.61	+1.61
Total formal votes		100,539	91.78	−1.46
Informal votes		8,999	8.22	+1.46
Turnout		109,538	91.38	−1.49
Two-party-preferred result
Labor	Michelle Rowland	61,864	61.53	+8.73
Liberal	Pradeep Pathi	38,675	38.47	−8.73
Labor hold		Swing	+8.73	

Alluvial diagram for preference flows in the seat of Greenway in the 2022 federal election. indicates at what stage the winning candidate had over 50% of the votes and was declared the winner.

=== Elections in the 2010s ===
==== 2019 ====
2019 Australian federal election: Greenway
Party	Candidate	Votes	%	±%
Labor	Michelle Rowland	43,901	45.97	−3.11
Liberal	Allan Green	38,759	40.58	+6.17
Greens	Damien Atkins	5,256	5.50	+1.74
United Australia	Scott Feeney	2,853	2.99	+2.99
Christian Democrats	Osbourn Rajadurai	2,666	2.79	−2.24
Better Families	Graham McFarland	2,072	2.17	+2.17
Total formal votes		95,507	93.24	+0.80
Informal votes		6,925	6.76	−0.80
Turnout		102,432	92.87	+0.55
Two-party-preferred result
Labor	Michelle Rowland	50,425	52.80	−3.51
Liberal	Allan Green	45,082	47.20	+3.51
Labor hold		Swing	−3.51	

==== 2016 ====
2016 Australian federal election: Greenway
Party	Candidate	Votes	%	±%
Labor	Michelle Rowland	43,722	49.08	+4.60
Liberal	Yvonne Keane	30,657	34.41	−5.55
Christian Democrats	Aaron Wright	4,484	5.03	+1.27
Greens	Chris Winslow	3,351	3.76	+0.11
Liberal Democrats	Timothy Mak	2,923	3.28	+3.28
Independent	Avtar Singh Billu	1,749	1.96	+1.96
Family First	Rohan Salins	1,273	1.43	+1.43
Science	Vivek Singha	924	1.04	+1.04
Total formal votes		89,083	92.44	+2.42
Informal votes		7,282	7.56	−2.42
Turnout		96,365	92.32	−0.26
Two-party-preferred result
Labor	Michelle Rowland	50,163	56.31	+3.33
Liberal	Yvonne Keane	38,920	43.69	−3.33
Labor hold		Swing	+3.33	

==== 2013 ====
2013 Australian federal election: Greenway
Party	Candidate	Votes	%	±%
Labor	Michelle Rowland	38,319	44.48	+2.16
Liberal	Jaymes Diaz	34,488	40.04	−1.30
Palmer United	Jodie Wootton	3,483	4.04	+4.04
Christian Democrats	Allan Green	3,253	3.78	+0.10
Greens	Chris Brentin	3,175	3.69	−2.32
Sex Party	Tom Lillicrap	1,516	1.76	+1.76
Rise Up Australia	Maree Nichols	681	0.79	+0.79
Katter's Australian	Anthony Belcastro	681	0.79	+0.79
Australian Voice	Jamie Cavanough	545	0.63	+0.63
Total formal votes		86,141	90.02	+0.29
Informal votes		9,549	9.98	−0.29
Turnout		95,690	93.96	−0.23
Two-party-preferred result
Labor	Michelle Rowland	45,639	52.98	+2.10
Liberal	Jaymes Diaz	40,502	47.02	−2.10
Labor hold		Swing	+2.10	

==== 2010 ====
2010 Australian federal election: Greenway
Party	Candidate	Votes	%	±%
Labor	Michelle Rowland	33,567	42.32	−7.36
Liberal	Jaymes Diaz	32,788	41.34	+2.05
Greens	Paul Taylor	4,769	6.01	+1.57
Christian Democrats	Allan Green	2,922	3.68	+0.86
Family First	Iris Muller	1,296	1.63	+0.38
Building Australia	John Baiada	815	1.03	+1.03
Australia First	Tony Pettitt	780	0.98	+0.98
Independent	Michael Santos	770	0.97	+0.97
Liberal Democrats	Joaquim de Lima	542	0.68	+0.51
Independent	Amarjit Tanda	530	0.67	+0.67
Democrats	Ronaldo Villaver	529	0.67	+0.67
Total formal votes		79,308	89.73	−4.09
Informal votes		9,075	10.27	+4.09
Turnout		88,383	94.20	+0.10
Two-party-preferred result
Labor	Michelle Rowland	40,355	50.88	−4.79
Liberal	Jaymes Diaz	38,953	49.12	+4.79
Labor notional hold		Swing	−4.79	

=== Elections in the 2000s ===
==== 2007 ====
2007 Australian federal election: Greenway
Party	Candidate	Votes	%	±%
Liberal	Louise Markus	40,338	50.10	−5.07
Labor	Michael Vassili	30,973	38.47	+9.11
Greens	Leigh Williams	4,617	5.73	+0.20
Christian Democrats	John Phillips	1,711	2.12	−0.07
Independent	F Ivor	1,343	1.67	+1.44
Family First	Joanne Muller	1,312	1.63	+0.09
Citizens Electoral Council	Goran Reves	228	0.28	+0.16
Total formal votes		80,522	95.37	+4.29
Informal votes		3,908	4.63	−4.29
Turnout		84,430	95.71	+1.21
Two-party-preferred result
Liberal	Louise Markus	43,881	54.50	−6.85
Labor	Michael Vassili	36,641	45.50	+6.85
Liberal hold		Swing	−6.85	

==== 2004 ====
2004 Australian federal election: Greenway
Party	Candidate	Votes	%	±%
Liberal	Louise Markus	33,353	43.96	+7.02
Labor	Ed Husic	30,389	40.05	−2.61
Greens	Astrid O'Neill	2,730	3.60	+0.96
Christian Democrats	Greg Tan	2,142	2.82	−2.81
Save the ADI Site	Jean Lopez	1,362	1.79	+1.79
One Nation	Tony Pettitt	1,040	1.37	−4.10
Liberals for Forests	Julie-Anne Houlton	895	1.18	+1.18
Fishing Party	Joe Chidiac	881	1.16	+1.16
Family First	John Dorhauer	877	1.16	+1.16
Outdoor Recreation	Grant Bayley	772	1.02	+1.02
Democrats	David King	672	0.89	−2.82
Independent	F Ivor	420	0.55	+0.55
Independent	Amarjit Tanda	267	0.35	−0.47
Citizens Electoral Council	Goran Reves	79	0.10	+0.10
Total formal votes		75,879	88.17	−5.04
Informal votes		10,183	11.83	+5.04
Turnout		86,062	95.31	+0.50
Two-party-preferred result
Liberal	Louise Markus	38,381	50.58	+3.69
Labor	Ed Husic	37,498	49.42	−3.69
Liberal gain from Labor		Swing	+3.69	

==== 2001 ====
2001 Australian federal election: Greenway
Party	Candidate	Votes	%	±%
Labor	Frank Mossfield	32,380	42.67	−3.34
Liberal	Rick Holder	28,038	36.94	+5.68
Christian Democrats	Bob Bawden	4,272	5.63	+1.43
One Nation	Tony Pettitt	4,155	5.47	−4.48
Democrats	Joseph Francis	2,818	3.71	−0.83
Greens	Tony Vlatko	2,002	2.64	+0.77
Against Further Immigration	Ted Sherwood	1,608	2.12	+2.12
Independent	Amarjit Singh Tanda	620	0.82	+0.82
Total formal votes		75,893	93.21	−1.36
Informal votes		5,530	6.79	+1.36
Turnout		81,423	95.18	
Two-party-preferred result
Labor	Frank Mossfield	40,310	53.11	−6.44
Liberal	Rick Holder	35,583	46.89	+6.44
Labor hold		Swing	−6.44	

=== Elections in the 1990s ===
==== 1998 ====
1998 Australian federal election: Greenway
Party	Candidate	Votes	%	±%
Labor	Frank Mossfield	36,010	46.43	+2.74
Liberal	Mathew Cross	23,865	30.77	−7.27
One Nation	Bill Nixon	7,774	10.02	+10.02
Democrats	Peter Reddy	3,497	4.51	−3.78
Christian Democrats	Bob Bawden	3,292	4.24	+0.99
Greens	Jocelyn Howden	1,459	1.88	+1.88
Unity	Reynolds Bonuedi	1,082	1.39	+1.39
Independent	Salvinder Dhillon	586	0.76	+0.76
Total formal votes		77,565	94.49	−0.21
Informal votes		4,522	5.51	+0.21
Turnout		82,087	95.09	−1.11
Two-party-preferred result
Labor	Frank Mossfield	46,493	59.94	+6.55
Liberal	Mathew Cross	31,072	40.06	−6.55
Labor hold		Swing	+6.55	

==== 1996 ====
1996 Australian federal election: Greenway
Party	Candidate	Votes	%	±%
Labor	Frank Mossfield	32,297	43.69	−15.14
Liberal	Vicki Burakowski	28,122	38.04	+5.89
Democrats	Bill Clancy	6,128	8.29	+3.69
Against Further Immigration	John Bates	3,369	4.56	+4.56
Call to Australia	Bob Bawden	2,408	3.26	+0.27
Natural Law	J.S. Ryder	1,602	2.17	+0.73
Total formal votes		73,926	94.70	−1.55
Informal votes		4,138	5.30	+1.55
Turnout		78,064	96.20	−0.08
Two-party-preferred result
Labor	Frank Mossfield	39,299	53.39	−10.03
Liberal	Vicki Burakowski	34,305	46.61	+10.03
Labor hold		Swing	−10.03	

==== 1993 ====
1993 Australian federal election: Greenway
Party	Candidate	Votes	%	±%
Labor	Russ Gorman	41,115	58.83	+8.82
Liberal	Ray Morris	22,470	32.15	−3.01
Democrats	Bill Clancy	3.215	4.60	−3.81
Call to Australia	John Jerrow	2,091	2.99	+2.68
Natural Law	Ray Alsop	1,002	1.43	+1.43
Total formal votes		69,893	96.25	+0.75
Informal votes		2,721	3.75	−0.75
Turnout		72,614	96.27	
Two-party-preferred result
Labor	Russ Gorman	44,316	63.42	+4.40
Liberal	Ray Morris	25,556	36.58	−4.40
Labor hold		Swing	+4.40	

==== 1990 ====
1990 Australian federal election: Greenway
Party	Candidate	Votes	%	±%
Labor	Russ Gorman	30,891	49.9	−10.0
Liberal	Tony Packard	21,824	35.3	−4.8
Democrats	Roger Posgate	4,866	7.9	+7.9
New Australia	Remi Biala	1,531	2.5	+2.5
Independent EFF	Warren Wormald	1,279	2.1	+2.1
Independent	Ivor F	764	1.2	+1.2
Democratic Socialist	Gail Lord	695	1.1	+1.1
Total formal votes		61,850	95.5	
Informal votes		2,946	4.5	
Turnout		64,796	95.9	
Two-party-preferred result
Labor	Russ Gorman	36,305	58.8	−1.1
Liberal	Tony Packard	25,452	41.2	+1.1
Labor hold		Swing	−1.1	

=== Elections in the 1980s ===
==== 1987 ====
1987 Australian federal election: Greenway
Party	Candidate	Votes	%	±%
Labor	Russ Gorman	35,386	59.9	+3.1
Liberal	Warren Musgrave	23,700	40.1	+11.6
Total formal votes		59,086	94.4	
Informal votes		3,535	5.6	
Turnout		62,621	94.9	
Labor hold		Swing	−3.9	

==== 1984 ====
1984 Australian federal election: Greenway
Party	Candidate	Votes	%	±%
Labor	Russ Gorman	31,384	56.8	−1.9
Liberal	Edna Mitchell	15,765	28.5	−1.6
Independent	Michael Corbin	5,557	10.1	+10.1
Independent	Ray Eade	2,557	4.6	+4.6
Total formal votes		55,263	91.3	
Informal votes		5,249	8.7	
Turnout		60,512	93.7	
Two-party-preferred result
Labor	Russ Gorman	35,263	63.8	−1.6
Liberal	Edna Mitchell	19,975	36.2	+1.6
Labor notional hold		Swing	−1.6	
