= John Cobb (Australian politician) =

Australian politician (born 1950)

The Honourable John Cobb
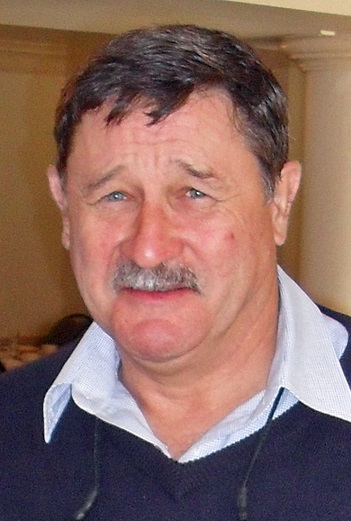

Minister for Community Services
- In office 27 January 2006 – 30 January 2007
- Prime Minister: John Howard
- Preceded by: Kay Patterson (as Minister for Family and Community Services)
- Succeeded by: Nigel Scullion

Minister for Citizenship and Multicultural Affairs
- In office 6 July 2005 – 27 January 2006
- Prime Minister: John Howard
- Preceded by: Peter McGauran
- Succeeded by: Amanda Vanstone (as Minister for Immigration and Multicultural Affairs)

Member of the Australian Parliament for Calare
- In office 24 November 2007 – 9 May 2016
- Preceded by: Peter Andren
- Succeeded by: Andrew Gee

Member of the Australian Parliament for Parkes
- In office 10 November 2001 – 24 November 2007
- Preceded by: Tony Lawler
- Succeeded by: Mark Coulton

Personal details
- Born: 11 February 1950 (age 76) Bathurst, New South Wales, Australia
- Party: The Nationals
- Spouses: Andrea (divorced) Gai (divorced) Lisa Syme (m. 2014)
- Children: 4

John Kenneth Cobb (born 11 February 1950) is an Australian former politician who served as a National Party member of the Australian House of Representatives from November 2001 representing the Division of Parkes, and the Division of Calare from 2007 to 2016 when he retired.

== Early life and education ==
Cobb was born in Bathurst, son of Lee and Mary Cobb, and was raised on the family property near Mount Hope, New South Wales.

== Career ==
=== Pre-political career ===
From the 1980s until his candidacy for Federal Parliament, Cobb was active in, and spent three years as president of the New South Wales Farmers Association, a lobby group representing farmers and rural and regional communities. He also continued to farm the family property.

=== Political career ===
Cobb was elected to the House of Representatives from the Division of Parkes, a safe National Party seat, at the 2001 federal election.

In July 2005, Cobb was appointed to the ministry as Minister for Citizenship and Multicultural Affairs, but was reshuffled to the community services portfolio in January 2006. In March 2006 he was criticised for being one of six 'prominent Coalition MPs' who did not disclose their shares in AWB Limited.

In October 2006, Cobb sparked controversy after reports that he had allegedly stated at a meeting of disability service advocates that he would "get rid of" a child who had a disability. Mr Cobb denied the accusations. Prime Minister John Howard backed his minister at the time, however Cobb lost the portfolio in a reshuffle three months later. He then became Assistant Minister for Water Resources.

After Parkes was dramatically altered in a redistribution, Cobb ran for the neighbouring seat of Calare at the 2007 election after the popular independent member Peter Andren retired. The Liberal-National Party Coalition lost the election, but Cobb won Calare handily. He was chosen by new Opposition leader Brendan Nelson to be a member of the shadow ministry, as the spokesperson on regional development and water security. He was re-elected at the 2010 election and in September 2010 was appointed Shadow Minister for Agriculture and Food Security by Opposition leader, Tony Abbott.

Following the 2013 federal election, Cobb nominated as deputy leader of the National Party, but was defeated by Barnaby Joyce, the newly elected member of New England. Cobb was not appointed to the Abbott Ministry.

On 27 February 2016, Cobb announced that he was retiring from politics and would not re-contest the Division of Calare in the 2016 Australian federal election.

== Personal life ==
Cobb is married and has four daughters from his first marriage. He is not related to one of his predecessors as the member for Parkes, Michael Cobb.

Political offices
Preceded by Peter McGauran	Minister for Citizenship and Multicultural Affairs; 2005–2006	Succeeded by Amanda Vanstone as Minister for Immigration and Multicultural Affairs
Preceded by Kay Patterson as Minister for Family and Community Services	Minister for Community Services; 2006–2007	Succeeded by Nigel Scullion
Parliament of Australia
Preceded by Tony Lawler	Member for Parkes; 2001–2007	Succeeded by Mark Coulton
Preceded by Peter Andren	Member for Calare; 2007–2016	Succeeded by Andrew Gee
