= Division of Parkes =

Australian federal electoral division

Coordinates: 30.887°S 147.373°E

Parkes Australian House of Representatives Division
- Interactive map of electorate boundaries from the 2025 federal election
- Created: 1984
- MP: Jamie Chaffey
- Party: Nationals
- Namesake: Sir Henry Parkes
- Electors: 130,913 (2025)
- Area: 406,755 km^{2} (157,049.0 sq mi)
- Demographic: Rural
Electorates around Parkes:
Grey (SA)	Maranoa (QLD)	Maranoa (QLD)
Grey (SA)	Parkes	New England
Farrer	Riverina	Calare

The Division of Parkes is an Australian electoral division in the state of New South Wales. Located in the northwestern part of the state, it is its largest division by land area at 406,755 km^{2} (157,049.0 sq mi), bordering both Queensland and South Australia. Its main cities are Broken Hill and Dubbo, the latter of which has always been included in the division throughout its history. Before the 2007 election and since the 2025 election, it also includes the town of Parkes which share the same namesake as the division.

Since its inception in 1984, the division has continuously been held by the National Party. Since 2025 its MP has been Jamie Chaffey.

== History ==
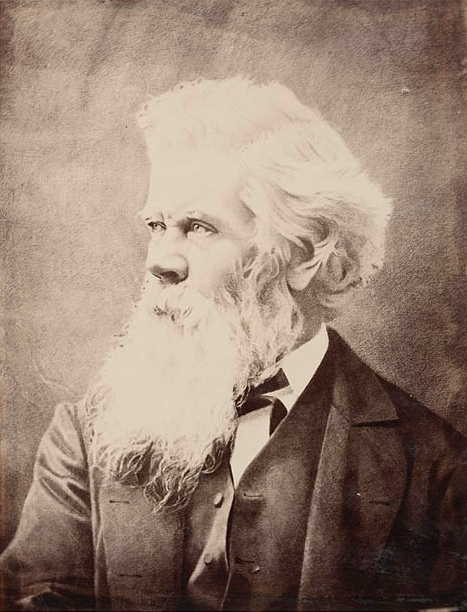
Sir Henry Parkes, the division's namesake

The former Division of Parkes (1901–1969) was located in suburban Sydney, and was not related to this division, except in name.

The division is named after Sir Henry Parkes, seventh Premier of New South Wales and sometimes known as the 'Father of Federation'. The division was proclaimed at the redistribution of 11 October 1984, and was first contested at the 1984 federal election. The seat is currently a safe Nationals seat. It was substantially changed by the 2006 redistribution and is now considered by many observers as the successor to the abolished Division of Gwydir. As a result, the then member for Parkes, John Cobb, instead contested the Division of Calare. The member for Parkes between 2007 federal election and 2025, was Mark Coulton, a member of the National Party of Australia.

According to the 2011 census, approximately 78 per cent of the population within the division identify as Christian, more than any other electorate in Australia at that time.

== Boundaries ==
Since 1984, federal electoral division boundaries in Australia have been determined at redistributions by a redistribution committee appointed by the Australian Electoral Commission. Redistributions occur for the boundaries of divisions in a particular state, and they occur every seven years, or sooner if a state's representation entitlement changes or when divisions of a state are malapportioned.

When the division was created in 1984, it covered areas that were previously in the Division of Gwydir, and to a smaller extent to the south, the Division of Calare. At the time, it included Dubbo and the town of Parkes, the latter sharing the same namesake as the division.

Between 1992 and 2006, it covered the north-west corner of the state, the Cameron Corner. This corner and the Far West of New South Wales, including Broken Hill, were previously part of the Riverina-Darling until the latter was abolished in 1992. In 2006, the division was significantly shifted east to cover the eastern portion of the abolished Division of Gwydir, with Dubbo being the only overlap with its previous boundary. As a result, the Far West and Cameron Corner were no longer covered by Parkes and were instead covered by Farrer. The division also no longer covered the town of Parkes for the first time since the creation of the division.

The 2016 redistribution resulted in the division regaining the areas in the Far West and Cameron Corner from Farrer. In the 2024 redistribution, it regained the town of Parkes.

The largest electorate in the state, it is located in the far north west of the state, adjoining the border with Queensland in the north and with South Australia in the west. Its largest population centre is Dubbo. Since 2025, it also includes the towns of Broken Hill, Dunedoo, Coonabarabran, Coonamble, Walgett, Narrabri, Moree, Warren, Nyngan, Cobar, Bourke, Parkes, Forbes and West Wyalong.

As of 2025, Dubbo is the only major settlement that has always been covered by the division ever since the division was created.

Redistribution	Map	Interactive	Elections	Notes
1984; 11 October			1984; 1987; 1990	
1992; 31 January			1993; 1996; 1998	
2000; 31 January			2001; 2004	
2006			2007	
2009			2010; 2013	
2016; 25 February			2016; 2019; 2022	
2024; 10 October			2025	

== Members ==
Image	Member	Party	Term	Notes
	Michael Cobb (1945–)	Nationals	1 December 1984 – 31 August 1998	Retired
	Tony Lawler (1961–)	Nationals	3 October 1998 – 8 October 2001	Retired
	John Cobb (1950–)	Nationals	10 November 2001 – 24 November 2007	Served as minister under Howard. Transferred to the Division of Calare
	Mark Coulton (1958–)	Nationals	24 November 2007 – 28 March 2025	Served as minister under Morrison. Retired
	Jamie Chaffey	Nationals	3 May 2025 – present	Incumbent

== Election results ==
2025 Australian federal election: Parkes
Party	Candidate	Votes	%	±%
National	Jamie Chaffey	41,912	39.96	−9.02
Labor	Nathan Fell	20,630	19.67	+0.14
One Nation	Mark Carter	14,320	13.65	+5.93
Shooters, Fishers, Farmers	Stephen Pope	6,776	6.46	+4.36
Greens	Trish Frail	6,404	6.11	+1.37
Libertarian	Sally Edwards	3,885	3.70	−2.66
Indigenous-Aboriginal	Bob Wilson	3,117	2.97	−1.21
Family First	Maurice Davey	2,690	2.56	+2.56
Independent	Stuart Howe	2,597	2.48	+0.44
Trumpet of Patriots	Petrus Van Der Steen	2,556	2.44	+2.44
Total formal votes		104,887	89.85	−2.43
Informal votes		11,855	10.15	+2.43
Turnout		116,742	89.22	+0.72
Two-party-preferred result
National	Jamie Chaffey	66,047	62.97	−5.18
Labor	Nathan Fell	38,840	37.03	+5.18
National hold		Swing	−5.18	
