= Jamie Chaffey =

Australian politician

Jamie Chaffey MP

Member of the Australian Parliament for Parkes
- Incumbent
- Assumed office 3 May 2025
- Preceded by: Mark Coulton

Personal details
- Party: National
- Website: www.nswnationals.org.au/jamie-chaffey/

Jamie Lesley Chaffey is a member of the Australian Parliament for the Division of Parkes representing the National Party after winning the seat in the 2025 Australian federal election. He was mayor of Gunnedah.

On 29 May 2025, he was appointed to the Ley shadow ministry as Shadow Assistant Minister for Agriculture and Shadow Assistant Minister for Resources. He continues to hold the roles in the Taylor shadow ministry.

Parliament of Australia
Preceded by Mark Coulton	Member for Parkes; 2025–present	Incumbent
