= Mark Coulton =

Australian politician (born 1958)

The Honourable Mark Coulton
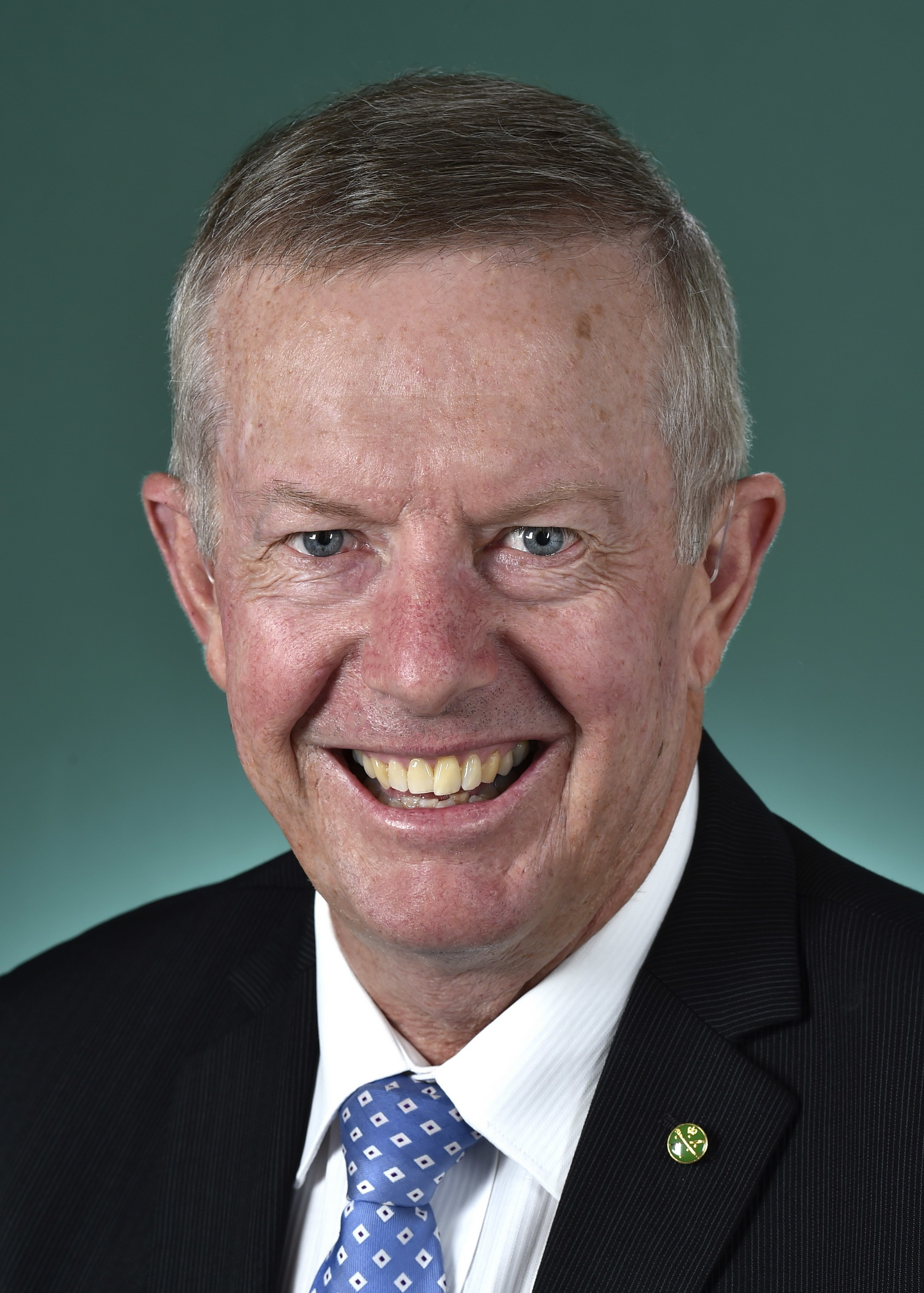

Minister for Regional Health, Regional Communications and Local Government
- In office 6 February 2020 – 2 July 2021
- Prime Minister: Scott Morrison
- Preceded by: Himself
- Succeeded by: Bridget McKenzie

Minister for Regional Services, Decentralisation and Local Government
- In office 26 May 2019 – 6 February 2020
- Prime Minister: Scott Morrison
- Preceded by: Bridget McKenzie
- Succeeded by: Himself; Andrew Gee (Regional Education, Decentralisation)

Assistant Minister for Trade and Investment
- In office 5 March 2018 – 6 February 2020
- Prime Minister: Malcolm Turnbull; Scott Morrison
- Preceded by: Luke Hartsuyker
- Succeeded by: Andrew Gee (Minister Assisting)

Deputy Speaker of the Australian House of Representatives
- In office 30 August 2016 – 26 February 2018
- Preceded by: Bruce Scott
- Succeeded by: Kevin Hogan

Member of the Australian Parliament for Parkes
- In office 24 November 2007 – 28 March 2025
- Preceded by: John Cobb
- Succeeded by: Jamie Chaffey

Personal details
- Born: 3 February 1958 (age 68) Sydney, Australia
- Party: National
- Occupation: Farmer
- Website: markcoulton.com.au

Mark Maclean Coulton (born 3 February 1958) is an Australian politician. He is a member of the National Party and he served in the House of Representatives from 2007 to 2025, representing the Division of Parkes in New South Wales. He has served as Minister for Regional Health, Regional Communications and Local Government (2020–2021), Minister for Regional Services, Decentralisation and Local Government (2019–2020), Assistant Minister for Trade and Investment (2019–2020), Assistant Minister for Trade, Tourism and Investment (2018–2019), and Deputy Speaker of the House (2016–2018).

== Early life ==
Coulton was born in Sydney on 3 February 1958, the son of Jack and Nancy Coulton. He grew up on the family's property in Gravesend, New South Wales. He was educated at Warialda Public School and Farrer Memorial Agricultural High School, where he was a boarder. He returned to the family farm after leaving school and later acquired a property of his own.

Prior to entering parliament, Coulton was involved in various community organisations, including the Warialda Pony Club, the Warialda Rotary Club, and the local Bush Fire Brigade. He served as president of the Warialda Pastoral and Agricultural Association, which organised the local agricultural show. In September 2004, Coulton was elected as the inaugural mayor of Gwydir Shire, a new local government area created from three smaller councils.

== Politics ==
Coulton announced in November 2006 that he would seek National Party preselection for the Division of Parkes. He had previously been the chairman of the party's electoral council for the Division of Gwydir, which was abolished and merged into Parkes. The incumbent Gwydir MP John Anderson was retiring, while the incumbent Parkes MP John Cobb chose to contest the Division of Calare.

Coulton was elected to parliament at the 2007 federal election. He served as a shadow parliamentary secretary from 2007 to 2010, and then as the Nationals' Chief Whip in the House of Representatives from 2010 to 2016. After the 2016 election he was elected Deputy Speaker. He endorsed Michael McCormack for the leadership of the National Party in February 2018, following the resignation of Barnaby Joyce.

=== Government minister ===
In March 2018, Coulton resigned as Deputy Speaker to take up the position of Assistant Minister for Trade, Tourism and Investment in the Turnbull government. He retained the position when Scott Morrison became prime minister in August 2018. In May 2019, following the Morrison government's re-election at the 2019 election, his title was changed to Assistant Minister for Trade and Investment and he was also given a full ministerial portfolio as Minister for Regional Services, Decentralisation and Local Government. Following a reshuffle in February 2020, he was appointed Minister for Regional Health, Regional Communications and Local Government.

Coulton repeated his endorsement of Michael McCormack for his party's leadership at the February 2020 leadership spill, describing it as an "unfortunate distraction". After McCormack was defeated by Joyce in the 2021 Nationals leadership spill, Joyce stripped Coulton of his ministerial portfolios.

=== Positions ===
In November 2020, Coulton stated in a parliamentary speech that Israel was engaged in "a level of apartheid" with regard to Palestinians. As of November 2023, he was co-chair of the Parliamentary Friends of Palestine.

== Personal life ==
Coulton married schoolteacher Robyn Redford in 1981, with whom he had three children. He also has two brothers, one of whom − John Coulton − is a Gwydir Shire councillor.

Parliament of Australia
Preceded by John Cobb	Member for Parkes; 2007–2025	Succeeded by Jamie Chaffey
Preceded by Bruce Scott	Deputy Speaker of the Australian House of Representatives; 2016–2018	Succeeded by Kevin Hogan
Political offices
Preceded by Luke Hartsuyker	Assistant Minister for Trade, Tourism and Investment; 2018–2020	Incumbent
