= Frank Mossfield =

Australian politician

Frank Mossfield AM

Member of the Australian Parliament for Greenway
- In office 2 March 1996 – 31 August 2004
- Preceded by: Russ Gorman
- Succeeded by: Louise Markus

Personal details
- Born: 4 June 1935 (age 90) Sydney, New South Wales, Australia
- Party: Australian Labor Party

Frank William Mossfield AM (born 4 June 1935) is a former Australian politician. He was a Labor member of the Australian House of Representatives from March 1996 to October 2004, representing the Division of Greenway.

== Pre-politics ==
Mossfield was born in Annandale, but spent the majority of his life in Blacktown where he married and raised 8 children.

Before entering politics Mossfield was a fitter and turner and union representative. He was the NSW State Secretary of the Australian Society of Engineers, and later the Greater New South Wales Branch Secretary of the Australian Workers' Union, an Executive Member of the Australian Council of Trade Unions and President of the Labor Council of New South Wales.

Mossfield was appointed a Member of the Order of Australia on Australia Day 1995 for his service to industrial relations though the trade union movement.

== Political career ==
Mossfield contested the 1996 federal election as Labor's candidate for the division of Greenway after the retirement of Russ Gorman. He received two party preferred a swing of -10.03%, but held the seat with 53.39% of the vote.

Mossfield was returned at the 1998 federal election with a two party preferred vote of 59.94%, a swing of +6.55%.

Mossfield was returned at the 2001 federal election with a two party preferred vote of 53.11%, a swing of -6.44%.

While in parliament, Mossfield was deputy chair of the House of Representatives Standing Committee on Procedure, and was a member of the committees on: Employment, Education and Training; Environment, Recreation and the Arts; Legal and Constitutional Affairs; Communications, Transport and the Arts; Ageing, and Transport and Regional Services.

Mossfield retired at the 2004 election.

== Post-politics ==
On 21 April 2021, Mossfield was awarded a Key to the City of Blacktown, by mayor Tony Bleasdale.

Parliament of Australia
Preceded by Russ Gorman	Member for Greenway; 1996–2004	Succeeded by Louise Markus
