= Russ Gorman =

Australian politician

Member of the Australian Parliament for Greenway
- In office 1 December 1984 – 29 January 1996
- Preceded by: New seat
- Succeeded by: Frank Mossfield

Member of the Australian Parliament for Chifley
- In office 5 March 1983 – 1 December 1984
- Preceded by: John Armitage
- Succeeded by: Roger Price

Personal details
- Born: 20 July 1926 Kandos, New South Wales
- Died: 3 January 2017 (aged 90) Bowral, New South Wales
- Party: Australian Labor Party
- Occupation: Public servant

Military service
- Allegiance: Australia
- Branch/service: Royal Australian Air Force
- Years of service: 1944–1946
- Rank: Leading Aircraftman

Russell Neville Joseph Gorman (20 July 1926 – 3 January 2017) was an Australian politician. He was an Australian Labor Party member of the Australian House of Representatives from 1983 to 1996, representing the electorate of Chifley. Gorman was the last veteran of the Second World War to serve in the House of Representatives.

Gorman was born in Kandos, New South Wales. He enlisted in the Royal Australian Air Force in 1944, reaching the rank of leading aircraftman, and was stationed at Ultimo, New South Wales, Benalla, Victoria, Oakey, Queensland and Townsville before his discharge in 1947. He worked as an overseer and personnel officer after the war, and was working for Blacktown City Council at the time of his election to parliament.

Gorman was elected to the House of Representatives at the 1983 federal election. During his first year, he faced criminal charges for domestic violence against his wife, being convicted in August but then having his conviction quashed in December. He denied the allegations, which re-emerged when Liberal Senator Noel Crichton-Browne was embroiled in a domestic violence controversy in 1995. In 1984, he transferred to the new seat of Greenway.

Gorman rarely spoke in parliament, stating on his retirement that he had only ever made "two major speeches", but he was known to speak his mind and for his colourful language elsewhere. He proposed lowering the pension age to 60 for all people, making mortgage payments tax-deductible for first home buyers, and requiring advertisers to contribute to the cost of cleaning up rubbish. In 1987, he reportedly told Treasurer Paul Keating during a debate about privatisation "if you blokes would stop stroking your stalks and get out there in the electorate, you'll find out what people really think of you". In 1994, opposing preferential treatment for women in Labor preselection, he publicly lashed Labor minister Bob McMullan as a 'dickhead' and opposed Carmen Lawrence for deputy prime minister because she had failed to help former premier Brian Burke, who had been jailed for corruption. He retired at the 1996 election.

Parliament of Australia
Preceded by John Armitage	Member for Chifley; 1983–1984	Succeeded by Roger Price
New division	Member for Greenway; 1984–1996	Succeeded by Frank Mossfield
