= Michael Cobb =

Australian politician

Member of the Australian Parliament for Parkes
- In office 1 December 1984 – 31 August 1998
- Preceded by: New seat
- Succeeded by: Tony Lawler

Personal details
- Born: 16 March 1945 (age 81) Blayney, New South Wales, Australia
- Party: National Party of Australia
- Spouse: Trish Worth
- Occupation: Company manager

Michael Roy Cobb (born 16 March 1945) is an Australian politician who represented the electorate of Parkes in the Australian House of Representatives from 1984 to 1998.

Before entering politics Cobb worked as a veterinary surgeon and ran a farm. He was active in the executive of the National Party of Australia from 1979 and entered federal politics when he was elected to the House of Representatives in 1984. He was reelected in the 1987, 1990, 1993 and 1996 elections. He retired prior to general elections in 1998.

in 1989, a private members bill was introduced by Cobb to make it an offence to desecrate, dishonour, burn, mutilate or destroy the Australian National Flag or an Australian Ensign, without lawful authority. An Australian Ensign was defined as the Australian White Ensign, the Australian Red Ensign or the Royal Australian Air Force Ensign. The maximum penalties were 2 years imprisonment or a fine of $5,000 or both. Mr Cobb re-introduced his Bill in 1990, 1991 and 1992. On each occasion, the Bill lapsed.

== Controversies ==
In 1998, Cobb was convicted under sections 29D and 29B of the Commonwealth Crimes Act in relation to travel allowance and motor vehicle claims. The court found he had lied on five of 102 counts after he claimed hotel expenses while sleeping in his car. Cobb was fined $14,000 and given a suspended two-year sentence after being found guilty of fraud and five charges of imposing on the Commonwealth.

== Publications ==
- The great tariff debate: a comprehensive review, Sydney: Livestock and Grain Producers' Association of New South Wales, 1983.

== Personal life ==
Michael Cobb married the South Australian Liberal Party politician, Trish Worth.

== See also ==
- List of Australian politicians convicted of crimes

Parliament of Australia
New division	Member for Parkes; 1984–1998	Succeeded by Tony Lawler
