= Roger Price (Australian politician) =

Australian politician

The Honourable Roger Price
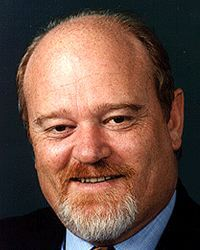

Member of the Australian Parliament for Chifley
- In office 1 December 1984 – 19 July 2010
- Preceded by: Russ Gorman
- Succeeded by: Ed Husic

Personal details
- Born: 26 November 1945 (age 80) Sydney
- Party: Australian Labor Party
- Occupation: Account manager

Leo Roger Spurway Price (born 26 November 1945) is an Australian former politician. He was elected as a member of the Australian House of Representatives at the 1984 election, representing the Division of Chifley in Western Sydney, for the Australian Labor Party until his retirement before the 2010 election.

Born in Sydney, Price was educated at the New South Wales Institute of Technology. He was an account manager with Telecom Australia before entering politics. He was an alderman on Blacktown City Council from 1981 until 1987 and served as deputy mayor in 1984–1985.

At the time of his retirement, Price was the longest-serving Labor member in the parliament (House or Senate).

Price served as Parliamentary Secretary to Prime Minister Bob Hawke from 4 June 1991 until 27 December 1991, when Paul Keating became prime minister. He then served as Parliamentary Secretary to the Minister for Defence until the March 1993 federal election. He was Opposition Chief Whip from 2004 until 29 November 2007, when he became the Chief Government Whip. Additionally, he has been a member of numerous Standing Committees and overseas parliamentary delegations.

On 20 March 2010, Price announced his intention to retire from politics at the 2010 federal election. After his retirement, he served as the Australian Consul-General to Chicago.

Parliament of Australia
Preceded by Russ Gorman	Member for Chifley; 1984–2010	Succeeded by Ed Husic
Diplomatic posts
Preceded by Elizabeth Schick	Australian Consul-General in Chicago; 2011–2015	Succeeded by Michael Wood
