= Tony Lawler =

Australian politician

Member of the Australian Parliament for Parkes
- In office 3 October 1998 – 8 October 2001
- Preceded by: Michael Cobb
- Succeeded by: John Cobb

Personal details
- Born: 18 October 1961 (age 65) Dubbo, New South Wales
- Party: National Party of Australia
- Education: University of Sydney
- Occupation: Pharmacist

Anthony John Lawler (born 18 October 1961) is an Australian politician. He was a National Party of Australia member of the Australian House of Representatives from 1998 to 2001, representing the electorate of Parkes. A pharmacist outside of politics, he retired after one term due to the impact of having to frequently be away from home on his young family.

== Early life and career ==
Lawler was born in Dubbo, New South Wales and educated at St John's Primary School and the University of Sydney before returning to Dubbo to work as a pharmacist in his family's pharmacy.

== Political career ==
In early 1998, Lawler joined the National Party after "[attending] a dinner party where everyone was complaining about how the country should be run" and, on the way home, deciding to "do something about it". He spoke with the party about contesting preselection for a state seat, but weeks later a vacancy came up for the National-held federal seat of Parkes at the forthcoming 1998 federal election, when MP Michael Cobb was charged with misusing of travel entitlements. Lawler nominated in what he viewed as a "dry run", and unexpectedly won National preselection for Parkes. Lawler won the seat at the October 1998 election with 54.1% of the two-party preferred vote.

In April 1999, Lawler advocated for improved compensation for disadvantaged people as part of the introduction of the Goods and Services Tax, breaking with the stance of his party. In July 1999, he supported Ian Causley against John Anderson for the National Party leadership, part of divisions reportedly over dissatisfaction with the direction of the federal Australia on economic rationalism and globalisation. Along with most other National Party MPs, he supported a "no" vote in the 1999 republic referendum Lawler opposed the full privatisation of Telstra, and was one of several dissident MPs to reject offers from Telstra of luxury Olympic ticket packages lest it be seen to compromise their position. He later supported a plan by former leader Tim Fischer considering the possibility of selling it to fund infrastructure increases in the future if service benchmarks were met first.

Lawler argued for temporarily suspending fuel excise rises and then reforming the excise itself, and defended ABC Local Radio against possible budget cuts on the basis of its significance to his region. He repeatedly advocated for measures to address the impact of the drought on regional communities, and was outspoken about the urgent need to improve rural roads and infrastructure. In advance of the 2001 election, he ruled out doing a preference deal with One Nation in Parkes and resolved to preference them last, arguing that they did not have the right solutions for Australia.

On 28 February 2001, Lawler announced his pending retirement from politics after only one term, citing the amount of time spent away from his family and the impact on their lives. In his last months in parliament, he took a more moderate position on refugees during the Tampa affair than his party, called for "calm and sympathy" following the September 11 attacks, expressed neutrality over whether the National Party should leave the Coalition and declared that he was "far more open-minded now" in relation to drug policy after sitting on a year-long parliamentary committee investigation of the issue. He also engaged in a months-long dispute with independent MP Peter Andren over whether an MRI machine should be assigned to Dubbo or Orange, in which Andren emerged successful.

Lawler recounted having been in a motel in Bourke while listening to his son read homework down the phone as having made him reconsider his political career. He cited highlights of his parliamentary career as being the establishment of a rural clinical school in Dubbo and gaining mobile phone coverage for Condobolin. His retirement was met with significant praise for his performance: the Cobar Age described Lawler as "much liked and modest", the Dubbo-based Daily Liberal described him as a "hard-working, dedicated and popular MP", his would-be Labor opponent said Lawler "put what was best for the community first and politics second", while he was also praised by the mayors of Cobar and Dubbo. He made his last speech in September 2001, stating "this job does take a toll on family life, and people pay a price. Unfortunately it is not a price that I am prepared to pay" and that "I estimate that my wife spends about two-thirds of the year as a single mum". He described a lack of progress on social and health problems in the Aboriginal community as one of his regrets.

== Post-parliament ==
Lawler returned to his pharmacy business, "Lawlers Family Pharmacies" (later "Lawlers Max Value Pharmacy") after his retirement. He also remained involved in local community organisations, serving as Dubbo committee chairman of Relay for Life and chairing a short-lived organisation to promote local business, Dubbo Retail Zooming. He briefly emerged from political retirement in 2003 to campaign against independent state MP Tony McGrane, arguing that independents could "not effect real change". He later served as a board member of the NSW Pharmacy Guild. In 2019, he was semi-retired, living in a village on the Central Coast while still working part-time in his pharmacy.

== Personal life ==
He was married to Ellen, a special education teacher, who died suddenly in 2012. They had four children.

Parliament of Australia
Preceded by Michael Cobb	Member for Parkes; 1998 – 2001	Succeeded by John Cobb
