= Ed Husic =

Australian politician (born 1970)

The Honourable Ed Husic MP
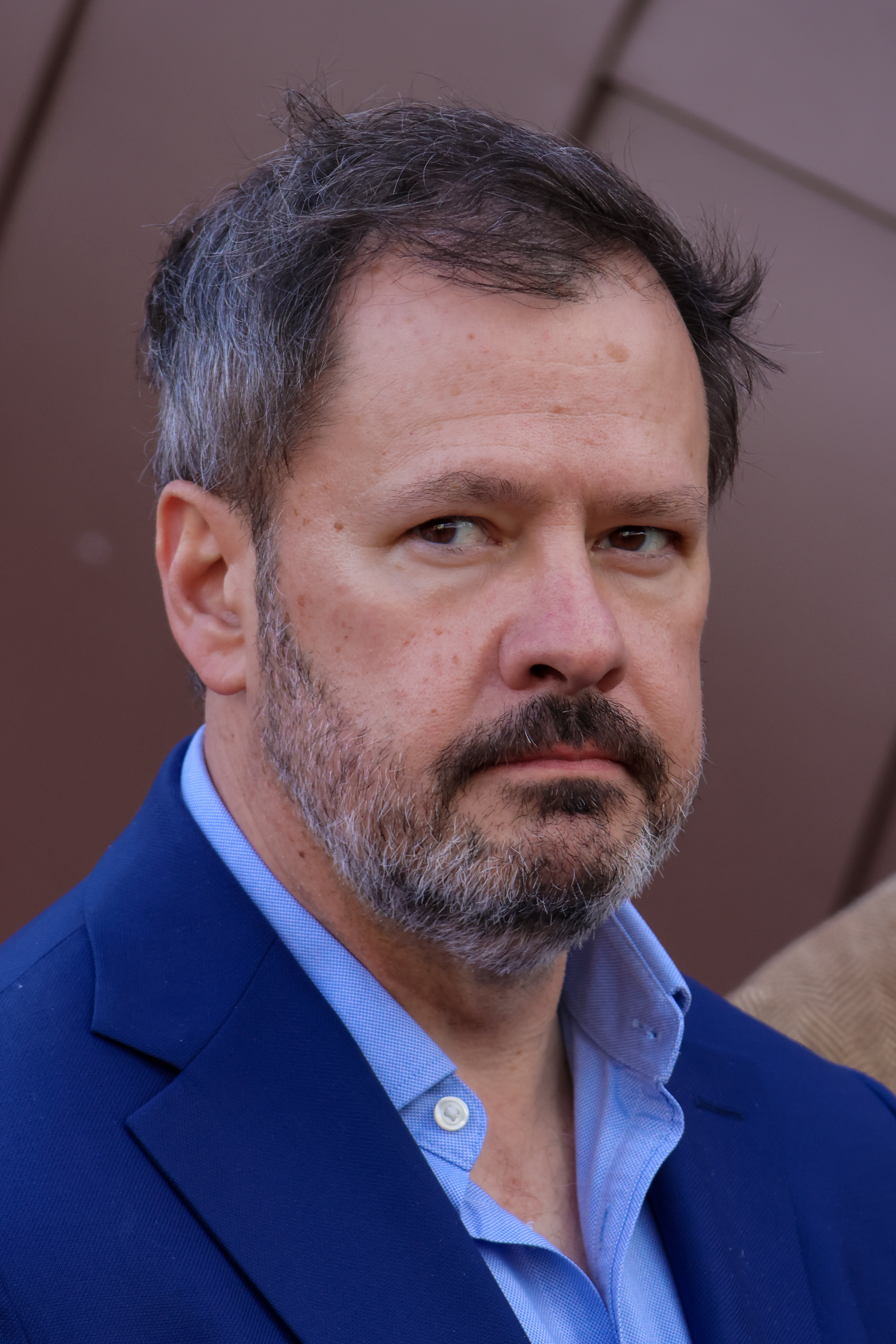
- Husic in 2026

Minister for Industry and Science
- In office 1 June 2022 – 13 May 2025
- Prime Minister: Anthony Albanese
- Preceded by: Angus Taylor (as Minister for Industry, Energy and Emissions Reduction); Melissa Price (as Minister for Science and Technology)
- Succeeded by: Tim Ayres (as Minister for Industry and Innovation and Minister for Science)

Member of the Australian Parliament for Chifley
- Incumbent
- Assumed office 21 August 2010
- Preceded by: Roger Price

Personal details
- Born: Edham Nurredin Husic; 3 February 1970 (age 56) Sydney, New South Wales, Australia
- Party: Labor
- Children: 1
- Education: Mitchell High School; Blacktown South Public School
- Alma mater: University of Western Sydney (BA)
- Occupation: Unionist; politician
- Website: www.edhusic.com

Edham Nurredin Husic (born 3 February 1970) is an Australian politician and trade unionist who served as the Minister for Industry and Science from 2022 to 2025 in the first Albanese government. A member of the Labor Party, he has been the member of Parliament (MP) for the New South Wales division of Chifley since 2010.

Born and raised in the Western Sydney suburbs of New South Wales to immigrant Bosnian Muslim parents, Husic graduated with a Bachelor in Arts with Applied Communications from the University of Western Sydney. Prior to politics, he worked as a trade unionist, official, organiser and later national president of the Communications, Electrical and Plumbing Union of Australia (CEPU)

Upon his election in 2010, Husic became the first Muslim to be elected to federal parliament, as well as the first Muslim to be made a commonwealth minister in the Australian government when he was appointed in 2022 by Prime Minister Anthony Albanese.

== Early life and education ==
Husic was born in Sydney to Bosnian Muslim immigrant parents who arrived in Australia in the late 1960s. His father, Hasib, was a welder involved in iconic projects undertaken by the Chifley government such as the Snowy Mountains Scheme and his mother is Hasiba. His siblings are Alan and Sabina.

Husic says that while growing up, his household practised Islam but also celebrated Christmas and Easter. As a child Husic did not attend the mosque, but in his twenties he took a deeper interest in Islam. After the September 11 attacks, Husic described himself as "non–practising" Muslim, in order to "make people feel more comfortable." He later regretted calling himself non–practising. Husic has said he spoke Bosnian at home, picking up English during his primary school years.

Husic was raised in Western Sydney and was educated at Blacktown South Public School, Mitchell High School and the University of Western Sydney, where he graduated with a Bachelor of Arts in Applied Communications.

== Early career and union involvement ==
In the 1990s, Husic worked as a research officer for the member for Chifley, Roger Price. Husic was first elected as a branch organiser in 1997. In 1998, he was elected as vice–president of the Communications Division of the Communications, Electrical and Plumbing Union of Australia (CEPU). From 1999 to 2003, he worked for Integral Energy as a communications manager. In July 2006, he became the secretary of the Communications Division of the CEPU. He was the national president of the CEPU before being elected to federal parliament.

== Political career ==
=== Preselection ===
Husic unsuccessfully contested the federal seat of Greenway at the 2004 federal election, representing the Labor Party. Husic lost to Liberal candidate Louise Markus. During the election, anonymous campaigners distributed leaflets attacking Ed Husic for being a Muslim. There were also reports that voters were urged to vote for Louise Markus "because she's a Christian". The Labor Party accused the Liberal Party of orchestrating the leaflets, which the Liberals denied.

Following the decision by Roger Price not to run for re–election, Husic contested and won the safe Labor seat of Chifley in 2010.

=== Rudd–Gillard Governments ===
When Kevin Rudd announced the Second Rudd Ministry in 2013, Husic became the first Muslim sworn onto the Australian federal government frontbench, as Parliamentary Secretary to the Prime Minister and Parliamentary Secretary for Broadband, taking his oath on the Quran.

=== Opposition ===
Husic served as the Shadow Minister for the Digital Economy and the Shadow Minister for Human Services until 2019, when he resigned to make way for Kristina Keneally. Husic was added back to the shadow cabinet when Joel Fitzgibbon resigned as Shadow Minister for Agriculture and Resources, with Husic taking over the portfolio. After a shadow cabinet reshuffle, Husic became the Shadow Minister for Industry and Innovation in January 2021. In parliament, he was good friends with Josh Frydenberg a Liberal party MP.

Husic's sister Sabina was Opposition Leader Anthony Albanese's deputy chief of staff between May 2019 and November 2020.

=== Albanese Government ===
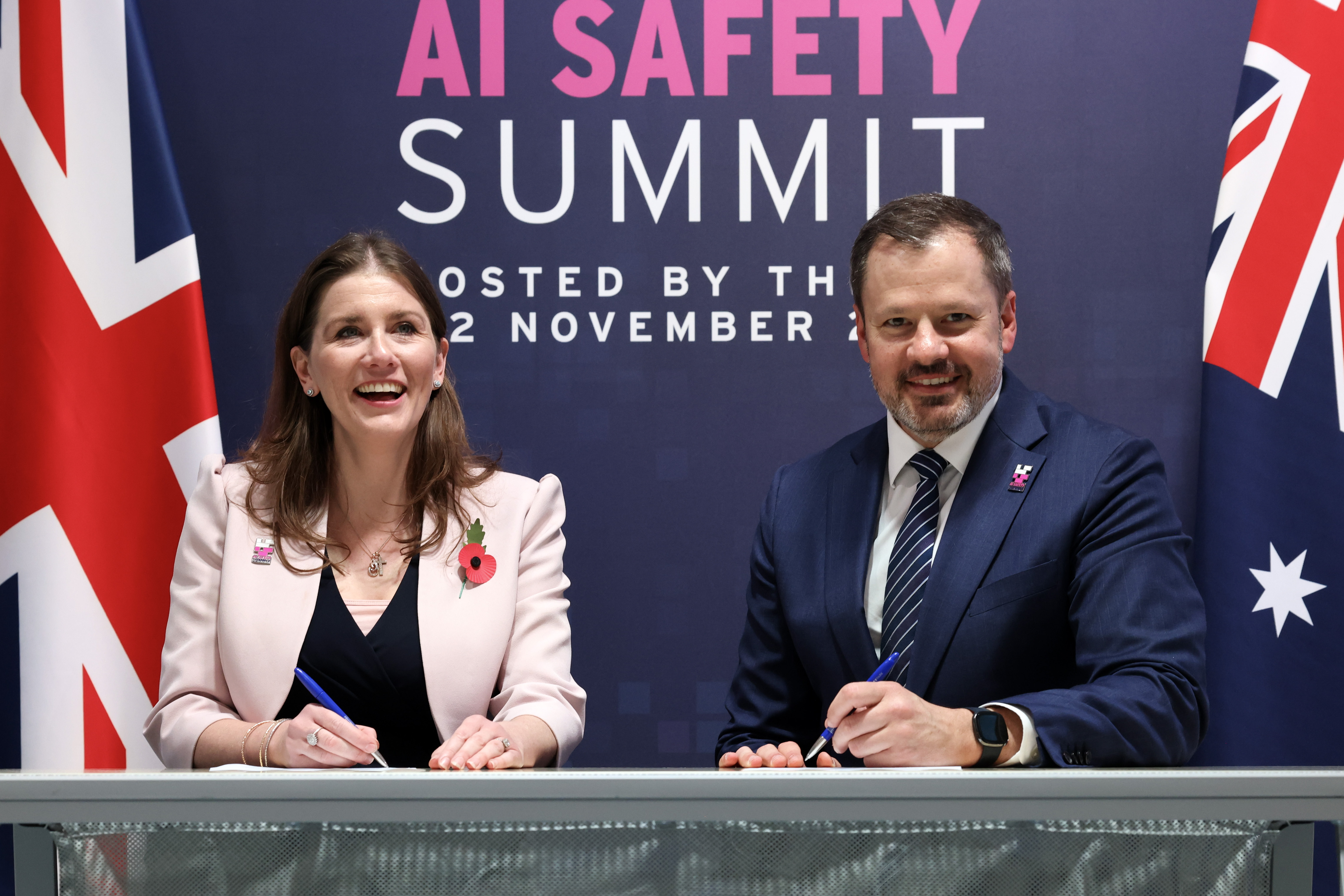
Ed Husic signing an MOU with Michelle Donelan at the UK AI Summit at Bletchley Park, October 2023.

After Labor's victory in the 2022 Australian federal election, Husic became the Minister for Industry and Science in the first ministry of prime minister Anthony Albanese. In the role he moved to introduce Australia's first mandatory safety requirements for artificial intelligence. He was proactive in his science portfolio and advanced various technological initiatives, increased local research capabilities and consolidated international partnerships.

After Labor's victory in the 2025 Australian federal election, Husic's tenure in the second Albanese ministry ended. Husic, a member of the right faction in the Labor party was removed due to the over–representation of the NSW branch in the ministry. He described Deputy Prime Minister Richard Marles as a "factional assassin" and questioned Labor's commitment to diversity. Husic said his outspokenness on the Gaza conflict in cabinet played a role in his removal. The ouster of the first Muslim cabinet member was criticised by former Labor prime minister Paul Keating and viewed negatively by some Australian Muslim community leaders and groups.

Since his removal from Cabinet, Husic has been outspoken on several policy issues and broken rank with government policy, with The Guardian labelling him a "rebel". Husic has criticised the AUKUS pact and called for the Albanese government to consider a "plan B", comments that were categorised by Defence Industry Minister Pat Conroy as "disingenous". He has also been critrical of the government's response to the Gaza war, and has called for greater taxes on gas exporters. In August 2025, Husic attended the March for Humanity in Sydney, a large protest highlighting the plight of Palestinians in the Gaza conflict.

== Political views ==
Husic was the primary advocate for a parliamentary investigation into the "Australia Tax," the significant price difference for certain IT products compared to overseas markets. He supports same–sex marriage.

In Australia Husic has attended commemoration events and made several speeches in parliament marking the Srebenica Genocide. In an opinion piece for The Guardian he has criticised the international order's failure to uphold the phrase of "Never again" in relation to genocide.

During October 2020, Husic said his potential to be chosen by fellow Labor politicians for future party leadership rested with the Australian population moving beyond their concerns about Islam.

In March 2021, Husic's parliamentary speech critiqued the Coalition government's approach to the Australian Muslim community through its use of the expression "Islamic terrorism" in relation to national security. Husic stated several politicians preferred to overlook problems affecting conservatism and described concerns said by some conservative senators over the term "right wing extremism" as being "politically convenient". He supported ASIO substituting both expressions with other terminology. Husic said he is against violent acts and Muslims like him over the years have been often confronted by conservatives to denounce "Islamist extremism".

Husic supports recognition of a Palestinian state. Public statements critical of Israeli actions impacting Palestinians in the Gaza conflict were made by Husic and he said the Australian Muslim community had concerns their voice on the issue was not being heard by the Labor government. He has called for targeted sanctions on several Israeli government ministers due to Israel's conduct toward Palestinian civilians in the Gaza conflict.

The Israeli and US bombing of Iran during the Twelve-Day War was criticised by Husic and he said a lack of international support destabilised the rules based order of which Australia, a middle power is dependent upon. He urged caution to an antisemitism report (July 2025) recommending adoption by the government of the IHRA antisemitism definition and financial cuts to universities, media and artists if deemed to have unbalanced depictions of Jews or failure to act against antisemitism. Husic stated the importance of bringing people together over a "heavy-handed" response and said the IHRA definition may impede criticism of Israeli actions such as in Gaza.

== Personal life ==
Husic was injured in a car accident on 6 August 2026.

Parliament of Australia
Preceded by Roger Price	Member for Chifley; 2010–present	Incumbent
Political offices
Preceded by Angus Taylor as Minister for Industry, Energy and Emissions Reduction	Minister for Industry and Science; 2022–2025	Succeeded by Tim Ayres
Preceded by Melissa Price as Minister for Science and Technology	Minister for Industry and Science; 2022–2025	Succeeded by Tim Ayres
