= Results of the 1987 Australian federal election in New South Wales =

1987 Australian federal election (New South Wales)
← 1984	11 July 1987	1990 →

All 51 New South Wales seats in the Australian House of Representatives and all 12 seats in the Australian Senate
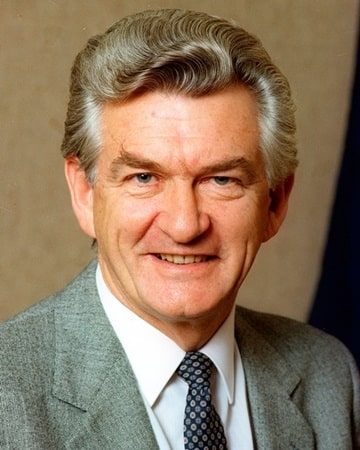

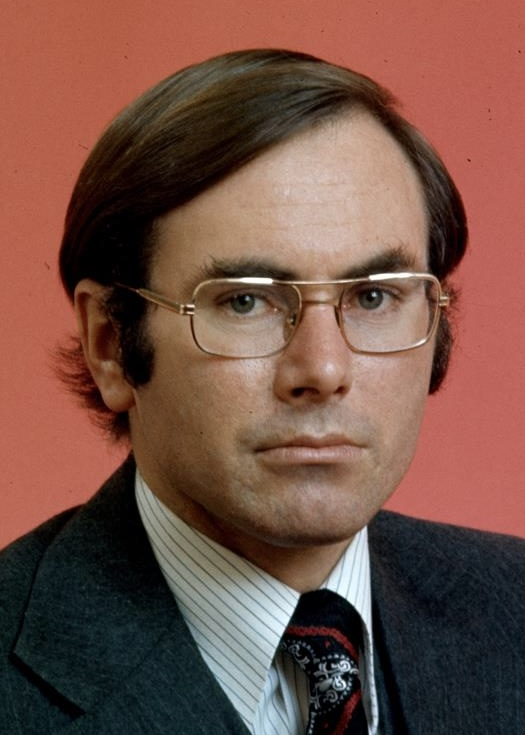
	First party	Second party
Leader	Bob Hawke	John Howard
Party	Labor	Liberal/National coalition
Last election	29 seats	22 seats
Seats won	28 seats	23 seats
Seat change	▼1	▲1
Popular vote	1,438,985	1,435,070
Percentage	45.2%	45.1%
Swing	▼3.1	▲1.8
TPP	50.29%	49.71%
TPP swing	▼2.62	▲2.62

This is a list of electoral division results for the Australian 1987 federal election in the state of New South Wales.

== Overall results ==
Turnout 93.9% (CV) — Informal 4.6%
Party	Votes	%	Swing	Seats	Change
Liberal	1,059,597	33.26	+0.5	13	▲1
National	375,443	11.78	+1.25	10	Steady
Liberal/National Coalition	1,435,040	45.04	+1.74	23	▲1
Labor	1,438,985	45.17	–3.09	28	▼1
Democrats	201,924	6.34	+0.43		
Independent	106,999	3.36	+1.19		
Unite Australia	1,837	0.06	+0.06		
Nuclear Disarmament	1,105	0.03	+0.18		
Total	3,185,920			51	
Two-party-preferred vote
Labor	1,602,013	50.29	–2.62		▼1
Liberal/National Coalition	1,583,465	49.71	+2.62		▲1
Invalid/blank votes	152,696	4.6	–1.6		
Turnout	3,338,616	93.9			
Registered voters	3,555,061				
Source: Psephos Adam Carr's Election Archive 1987

== Results by division ==
=== Banks ===
This section is an excerpt from Electoral results for the Division of Banks § 1987

1987 Australian federal election: Banks
Party	Candidate	Votes	%	±%
Labor	John Mountford	32,687	52.8	−4.6
Liberal	Max Parker	24,430	39.4	+4.3
Democrats	Montague Green	4,819	7.8	+0.4
Total formal votes		61,936	95.4	+1.7
Informal votes		3,017	4.6	−1.7
Turnout		64,953	96.5	+1.1
Two-party-preferred result
Labor	John Mountford	35,180	56.8	−4.6
Liberal	Max Parker	26,745	43.2	+4.6
Labor hold		Swing	−4.6	

=== Barton ===
This section is an excerpt from Electoral results for the Division of Barton § 1987

1987 Australian federal election: Barton
Party	Candidate	Votes	%	±%
Labor	Gary Punch	31,773	48.5	+0.0
Liberal	Bob Gemmell	29,473	45.0	+0.0
Independent	Jim McLean	3,724	5.7	+5.7
Independent	Charles Bellchambers	600	0.9	+0.9
Total formal votes		65,570	96.2	
Informal votes		2,598	3.8	
Turnout		68,168	94.2	
Two-party-preferred result
Labor	Gary Punch	33,463	51.0	−0.2
Liberal	Bob Gemmell	32,097	49.0	+0.2
Labor hold		Swing	−0.2	

=== Bennelong ===
This section is an excerpt from Electoral results for the Division of Bennelong § 1987

1987 Australian federal election: Bennelong
Party	Candidate	Votes	%	±%
Liberal	John Howard	36,266	56.9	+2.7
Labor	Beverley Sharpe	21,533	33.8	−3.4
Democrats	Paul Taylor	4,603	7.2	−1.4
Independent	Stephen Davidson	710	1.1	+1.1
Independent	John Dawson	573	0.9	+0.9
Total formal votes		63,685	96.5	
Informal votes		2,309	3.5	
Turnout		65,994	94.1	
Two-party-preferred result
Liberal	John Howard	38,601	60.6	+2.1
Labor	Beverley Sharpe	25,080	39.4	−2.1
Liberal hold		Swing	+2.1	

=== Berowra ===
This section is an excerpt from Electoral results for the Division of Berowra § 1987

1987 Australian federal election: Berowra
Party	Candidate	Votes	%	±%
Liberal	Harry Edwards	40,288	62.4	+2.2
Labor	Sue Deane	18,173	28.1	−2.5
Democrats	Peter Markham	6,122	9.5	+0.2
Total formal votes		64,583	96.7	
Informal votes		2,204	3.3	
Turnout		66,787	94.4	
Two-party-preferred result
Liberal	Harry Edwards	43,045	66.7	+1.9
Labor	Sue Deane	21,535	33.3	−1.9
Liberal hold		Swing	+1.9	

=== Blaxland ===
This section is an excerpt from Electoral results for the Division of Blaxland § 1987

1987 Australian federal election: Blaxland
Party	Candidate	Votes	%	±%
Labor	Paul Keating	30,968	53.2	−8.6
Liberal	Andrew Thorn	19,573	33.6	+2.7
Independent	Philip Black	2,782	4.8	+4.8
Democrats	John Young	2,222	3.8	−3.5
Independent	Paul Keating	1,239	2.1	+2.1
Independent	Tony Leitao	759	1.3	+1.3
Independent	Frank Rayner	431	0.7	+0.7
Independent	Kaye Tucker	221	0.4	+0.4
Total formal votes		58,195	90.9	
Informal votes		5,860	9.1	
Turnout		64,055	94.0	
Two-party-preferred result
Labor	Paul Keating	34,192	58.8	−7.4
Liberal	Andrew Thorn	23,950	41.2	+7.4
Labor hold		Swing	−7.4	

=== Bradfield ===
This section is an excerpt from Electoral results for the Division of Bradfield § 1987

1987 Australian federal election: Bradfield
Party	Candidate	Votes	%	±%
Liberal	David Connolly	45,630	71.6	+0.1
Labor	Michael Fry	12,359	19.4	−1.3
Democrats	Fiona Richardson	5,745	9.0	+1.2
Total formal votes		63,734	97.2	
Informal votes		1,864	2.8	
Turnout		65,598	94.1	
Two-party-preferred result
Liberal	David Connolly	48,495	76.1	+0.6
Labor	Michael Fry	15,236	23.9	−0.6
Liberal hold		Swing	+0.6	

=== Calare ===
This section is an excerpt from Electoral results for the Division of Calare § 1987

1987 Australian federal election: Calare
Party	Candidate	Votes	%	±%
Labor	David Simmons	31,988	48.9	+0.9
Liberal	Mick English	16,319	25.0	+7.6
National	Stewart Hespe	13,653	20.9	−1.1
Democrats	Bob Dolton	2,767	4.2	+0.8
Independent	Eve Buscombe	656	1.0	+1.0
Total formal votes		65,383	96.9	
Informal votes		2,074	3.1	
Turnout		67,457	96.4	
Two-party-preferred result
Labor	David Simmons	34,834	53.3	−2.3
Liberal	Mick English	30,537	46.7	+2.3
Labor hold		Swing	−2.3	

=== Charlton ===
This section is an excerpt from Electoral results for the Division of Charlton § 1987

1987 Australian federal election: Charlton
Party	Candidate	Votes	%	±%
Labor	Bob Brown	36,113	57.7	−4.6
Liberal	Mollie Blake	17,084	27.3	−0.1
Democrats	Lyn Godfrey	7,252	11.6	+1.3
Independent	Vishnu Chaudhary	2,110	3.4	+3.4
Total formal votes		62,559	95.8	
Informal votes		2,760	4.2	
Turnout		65,319	95.4	
Two-party-preferred result
Labor	Bob Brown	41,830	66.9	−0.4
Liberal	Mollie Blake	20,729	33.1	+0.4
Labor hold		Swing	−0.4	

=== Chifley ===
This section is an excerpt from Electoral results for the Division of Chifley § 1987

1987 Australian federal election: Chifley
Party	Candidate	Votes	%	±%
Labor	Roger Price	38,683	64.3	−2.3
Liberal	Paul Conlon	16,414	27.3	−0.3
Democrats	Philip Goldhagen	4,128	6.9	+1.1
Independent	Cheryl Crisp	960	1.6	+1.6
Total formal votes		60,185	92.7	
Informal votes		4,706	7.3	
Turnout		64,891	94.0	
Two-party-preferred result
Labor	Roger Price	41,586	69.1	−0.4
Liberal	Paul Conlon	18,596	30.9	+0.4
Labor hold		Swing	−0.4	

=== Cook ===
This section is an excerpt from Electoral results for the Division of Cook § 1987

1987 Australian federal election: Cook
Party	Candidate	Votes	%	±%
Liberal	Don Dobie	34,590	53.7	+1.2
Labor	Michael Addison	25,987	40.4	−1.4
Democrats	Mark Freeman	3,805	5.9	+0.2
Total formal votes		64,382	96.9	
Informal votes		2,083	3.1	
Turnout		66,465	96.1	
Two-party-preferred result
Liberal	Don Dobie	36,092	56.1	+0.7
Labor	Michael Addison	28,290	43.9	−0.7
Liberal hold		Swing	+0.7	

=== Cowper ===
This section is an excerpt from Electoral results for the Division of Cowper § 1987

1987 Australian federal election: Cowper
Party	Candidate	Votes	%	±%
National	Garry Nehl	33,328	50.3	+20.2
Labor	John Murphy	23,393	35.3	−5.8
Independent	David Rees	4,273	6.5	+3.1
Democrats	Dorothy Thompson	4,122	6.2	+3.3
Independent	Max Austin	1,132	1.7	+1.7
Total formal votes		66,248	97.2	
Informal votes		1,929	2.8	
Turnout		68,177	93.5	
Two-party-preferred result
National	Garry Nehl	39,150	59.1	+5.0
Labor	John Murphy	27,089	40.9	−5.0
National hold		Swing	+5.0	

=== Cunningham ===
This section is an excerpt from Electoral results for the Division of Cunningham § 1987

1987 Australian federal election: Cunningham
Party	Candidate	Votes	%	±%
Labor	Stewart West	34,365	59.1	−3.7
Liberal	Jeff Thomson	17,171	29.5	+4.2
Democrats	Ray Dargavel	6,038	10.4	+2.8
Independent	Rudy Pasara	568	1.0	+1.0
Total formal votes		58,142	93.6	
Informal votes		3,988	6.4	
Turnout		62,130	92.9	
Two-party-preferred result
Labor	Stewart West	37,442	64.4	−4.7
Liberal	Jeff Thomson	20,693	35.6	+4.7
Labor hold		Swing	−4.7	

=== Dobell ===
This section is an excerpt from Electoral results for the Division of Dobell § 1987

1987 Australian federal election: Dobell
Party	Candidate	Votes	%	±%
Labor	Michael Lee	33,719	53.1	−3.1
Liberal	Les Nunn	24,168	38.0	+1.7
Democrats	Graeme Ward	5,657	8.9	+1.4
Total formal votes		63,544	96.1	
Informal votes		2,580	3.9	
Turnout		66,124	95.4	
Two-party-preferred result
Labor	Michael Lee	36,161	56.9	−3.0
Liberal	Les Nunn	27,383	43.1	+3.0
Labor hold		Swing	−3.0	

=== Dundas ===
This section is an excerpt from Electoral results for the Division of Dundas § 1987

1987 Australian federal election: Dundas
Party	Candidate	Votes	%	±%
Liberal	Philip Ruddock	35,747	57.4	+2.2
Labor	Veronica Husted	20,786	33.4	−2.6
Democrats	Robert Springett	5,738	9.2	+0.4
Total formal votes		62,271	96.5	
Informal votes		2,257	3.5	
Turnout		64,528	93.9	
Two-party-preferred result
Liberal	Philip Ruddock	38,010	61.0	+2.1
Labor	Veronica Husted	24,261	39.0	−2.1
Liberal hold		Swing	+2.1	

=== Eden-Monaro ===
This section is an excerpt from Electoral results for the Division of Eden-Monaro § 1987

1987 Australian federal election: Eden-Monaro
Party	Candidate	Votes	%	±%
Labor	Jim Snow	30,335	48.4	+1.2
Liberal	David Evans	18,088	28.8	−13.9
National	Peter Cochran	10,316	16.4	+12.6
Independent	John McGlynn	3,582	5.7	+5.7
Unite Australia	Horst Kirchner	405	0.6	+0.6
Total formal votes		62,726	96.8	
Informal votes		2,045	3.2	
Turnout		64,771	92.9	
Two-party-preferred result
Labor	Jim Snow	34,144	54.4	+2.4
Liberal	David Evans	28,577	45.6	−2.4
Labor hold		Swing	+2.4	

=== Farrer ===
This section is an excerpt from Electoral results for the Division of Farrer § 1987

1987 Australian federal election: Farrer
Party	Candidate	Votes	%	±%
National	Tim Fischer	37,753	58.2	+14.8
Labor	Barry Marks	21,129	32.6	−3.2
Independent	Ray Brooks	5,977	9.2	+9.2
Total formal votes		64,859	96.2	
Informal votes		2,536	3.8	
Turnout		67,395	93.0	
Two-party-preferred result
National	Tim Fischer	42,302	65.2	+2.2
Labor	Barry Marks	22,555	34.8	−2.2
National hold		Swing	+2.2	

=== Fowler ===
This section is an excerpt from Electoral results for the Division of Fowler § 1987

1987 Australian federal election: Fowler
Party	Candidate	Votes	%	±%
Labor	Ted Grace	33,563	58.9	−8.0
Liberal	Jeff Fishlock	18,639	32.7	+5.6
Democrats	Robert Neesam	4,809	8.4	+8.4
Total formal votes		57,011	90.0	
Informal votes		6,367	10.0	
Turnout		63,378	94.7	
Two-party-preferred result
Labor	Ted Grace	35,582	62.4	−7.9
Liberal	Jeff Fishlock	21,423	37.6	+7.9
Labor hold		Swing	−7.9	

=== Gilmore ===
This section is an excerpt from Electoral results for the Division of Gilmore § 1987

1987 Australian federal election: Gilmore
Party	Candidate	Votes	%	±%
National	John Sharp	32,216	52.3	+24.0
Labor	John Wright	25,207	40.9	−3.5
Democrats	Alan Blackshaw	2,849	4.6	+1.9
Independent	Reen Dixon	1,356	2.2	+2.2
Total formal votes		61,628	97.1	
Informal votes		1,826	2.9	
Turnout		63,454	95.2	
Two-party-preferred result
National	John Sharp	34,643	56.2	+5.0
Labor	John Wright	26,977	43.8	−5.0
National hold		Swing	+5.0	

=== Grayndler ===
This section is an excerpt from Electoral results for the Division of Grayndler § 1987

1987 Australian federal election: Grayndler
Party	Candidate	Votes	%	±%
Labor	Leo McLeay	31,240	52.7	−7.6
Liberal	Khalil Tartak	20,698	34.9	+5.6
Democrats	Peter Hennessy	3,602	6.1	−0.7
Independent	Jack Shanahan	2,108	3.6	+3.6
Independent	Nick Papanikitas	1,686	2.8	+2.8
Total formal votes		59,334	92.4	
Informal votes		5,601	8.6	
Turnout		64,935	91.2	
Two-party-preferred result
Labor	Leo McLeay	35,395	59.7	−5.2
Liberal	Keith Tartak	23,883	40.3	+5.2
Labor hold		Swing	−5.2	

=== Greenway ===
This section is an excerpt from Electoral results for the Division of Greenway § 1987

1987 Australian federal election: Greenway
Party	Candidate	Votes	%	±%
Labor	Russ Gorman	35,386	59.9	+3.1
Liberal	Warren Musgrave	23,700	40.1	+11.6
Total formal votes		59,086	94.4	
Informal votes		3,535	5.6	
Turnout		62,621	94.9	
Labor hold		Swing	−3.9	

=== Gwydir ===
This section is an excerpt from Electoral results for the Division of Gwydir § 1987

1987 Australian federal election: Gwydir
Party	Candidate	Votes	%	±%
National	Ralph Hunt	35,934	57.2	+2.5
Labor	Trevor Elks	23,200	36.9	−3.7
Independent	Lloyd Fleming	3,695	5.9	+5.9
Total formal votes		62,829	96.5	
Informal votes		2,287	3.5	
Turnout		65,116	94.8	
Two-party-preferred result
National	Ralph Hunt	37,871	60.3	+3.0
Labor	Trevor Elks	24,958	39.7	−3.0
National hold		Swing	+3.0	

=== Hughes ===
This section is an excerpt from Electoral results for the Division of Hughes § 1987

1987 Australian federal election: Hughes
Party	Candidate	Votes	%	±%
Labor	Robert Tickner	31,636	49.8	−2.7
Liberal	Cliff Mason	26,433	41.6	+2.0
Democrats	Paul Terrett	5,416	8.5	+1.5
Total formal votes		63,485	95.9	
Informal votes		2,696	4.1	
Turnout		66,181	95.2	
Two-party-preferred result
Labor	Robert Tickner	34,958	55.1	−1.4
Liberal	Cliff Mason	28,524	44.9	+1.4
Labor hold		Swing	−1.4	

=== Hume ===
This section is an excerpt from Electoral results for the Division of Hume § 1987

1987 Australian federal election: Hume
Party	Candidate	Votes	%	±%
Liberal	Wal Fife	33,687	52.7	+21.5
Labor	Rod Milliken	24,516	38.4	−0.9
Democrats	Scott Milne	2,498	3.9	+3.9
Independent	Jim Eldridge	1,843	2.9	+2.9
Nuclear Disarmament	Duncan Marshall	1,105	1.7	+1.7
Independent	David Herald	243	0.4	+0.4
Total formal votes		63,892	97.5	
Informal votes		1,632	2.5	
Turnout		65,524	94.0	
Two-party-preferred result
Liberal	Wal Fife	36,750	57.5	−0.2
Labor	Rod Milliken	27,137	42.5	+0.2
Liberal hold		Swing	−0.2	

=== Hunter ===
This section is an excerpt from Electoral results for the Division of Hunter § 1987

1987 Australian federal election: Hunter
Party	Candidate	Votes	%	±%
Labor	Eric Fitzgibbon	31,656	48.9	+1.6
National	John Turner	16,067	24.8	+4.3
Liberal	Graham Dunkley	13,053	20.2	−7.1
Democrats	Maureen Simpson	3,902	6.0	+1.1
Total formal votes		64,678	96.6	
Informal votes		2,267	3.4	
Turnout		66,945	96.0	
Two-party-preferred result
Labor	Eric Fitzgibbon	34,685	53.6	+1.2
National	John Turner	29,993	46.4	+46.4
Labor hold		Swing	+1.2	

=== Kingsford Smith ===
This section is an excerpt from Electoral results for the Division of Kingsford Smith § 1987

1987 Australian federal election: Kingsford-Smith
Party	Candidate	Votes	%	±%
Labor	Lionel Bowen	36,478	59.7	−3.2
Liberal	Carolyn O'Connor	19,903	32.6	+6.9
Democrats	Philippa Leehy	4,765	7.8	+0.3
Total formal votes		61,146	92.4	
Informal votes		5,014	7.6	
Turnout		66,160	90.9	
Two-party-preferred result
Labor	Lionel Bowen	39,284	64.2	−6.6
Liberal	Carolyn O'Connor	21,862	35.8	+6.6
Labor hold		Swing	−6.6	

=== Lindsay ===
This section is an excerpt from Electoral results for the Division of Lindsay § 1987

1987 Australian federal election: Lindsay
Party	Candidate	Votes	%	±%
Labor	Ross Free	32,949	52.4	−5.1
Liberal	Glynis Hayne	23,193	36.9	+2.7
Democrats	Michael Gregory	5,276	8.4	+0.1
Independent	Ian Perry	1,414	2.3	+2.3
Total formal votes		62,832	95.1	
Informal votes		3,238	4.9	
Turnout		66,070	95.8	
Two-party-preferred result
Labor	Ross Free	37,033	59.0	−2.6
Liberal	Glynis Hayne	25,785	41.0	+2.6
Labor hold		Swing	−2.6	

=== Lowe ===
This section is an excerpt from Electoral results for the Division of Lowe § 1987

1987 Australian federal election: Lowe
Party	Candidate	Votes	%	±%
Liberal	Bob Woods	29,724	47.2	+3.7
Labor	Michael Maher	29,644	47.1	−2.3
Independent	George Turner	2,197	3.5	+3.5
Unite Australia	Tony Farrell	1,432	2.3	+2.3
Total formal votes		62,997	94.4	
Informal votes		3,702	5.6	
Turnout		66,699	93.6	
Two-party-preferred result
Liberal	Bob Woods	32,520	51.6	+3.8
Labor	Michael Maher	30,454	48.4	−3.8
Liberal gain from Labor		Swing	+3.8	

=== Lyne ===
This section is an excerpt from Electoral results for the Division of Lyne § 1987

1987 Australian federal election: Lyne
Party	Candidate	Votes	%	±%
National	Bruce Cowan	36,467	55.0	+1.8
Labor	Garry Worth	24,252	36.6	−3.1
Democrats	John Aitken	5,534	8.4	+2.7
Total formal votes		66,253	96.9	
Informal votes		2,135	3.1	
Turnout		68,688	96.6	
Two-party-preferred result
National	Bruce Cowan	39,629	59.8	+4.4
Labor	Garry Worth	26,619	40.2	−4.4
National hold		Swing	+4.4	

=== Macarthur ===
This section is an excerpt from Electoral results for the Division of Macarthur § 1987

1987 Australian federal election: Macarthur
Party	Candidate	Votes	%	±%
Labor	Stephen Martin	32,404	53.7	−1.8
Liberal	Ron Forrester	22,106	36.6	+3.6
Democrats	Meg Sampson	5,862	9.7	−1.8
Total formal votes		60,372	95.1	
Informal votes		3,085	4.9	
Turnout		63,457	94.2	
Two-party-preferred result
Labor	Stephen Martin	35,558	58.9	−3.4
Liberal	Ron Forrester	24,814	41.1	+3.4
Labor hold		Swing	−3.4	

=== Mackellar ===
This section is an excerpt from Electoral results for the Division of Mackellar § 1987

1987 Australian federal election: Mackellar
Party	Candidate	Votes	%	±%
Liberal	Jim Carlton	35,225	56.9	+2.8
Labor	Eileen Blackmore	19,254	31.1	−3.9
Democrats	Graeme Maclennan	6,189	10.0	+0.7
Independent	Maurice Foley	1,274	2.1	+0.4
Total formal votes		61,942	96.0	
Informal votes		2,584	4.0	
Turnout		64,526	93.1	
Two-party-preferred result
Liberal	Jim Carlton	39,137	63.2	+3.1
Labor	Eileen Blackmore	22,799	36.8	−3.1
Liberal hold		Swing	+3.1	

=== Macquarie ===
This section is an excerpt from Electoral results for the Division of Macquarie § 1987

1987 Australian federal election: Macquarie
Party	Candidate	Votes	%	±%
Liberal	Alasdair Webster	30,010	50.3	+9.2
Labor	David March	23,096	38.7	−1.9
Democrats	Bruce Forbes	6,582	11.0	+3.7
Total formal votes		59,688	96.0	
Informal votes		2,497	4.0	
Turnout		62,185	93.5	
Two-party-preferred result
Liberal	Alasdair Webster	33,300	55.8	+4.4
Labor	David March	26,383	44.2	−4.4
Liberal hold		Swing	+4.4	

=== Mitchell ===
This section is an excerpt from Electoral results for the Division of Mitchell § 1987

1987 Australian federal election: Mitchell
Party	Candidate	Votes	%	±%
Liberal	Alan Cadman	46,473	72.5	+5.0
Labor	Geoff Robinson	17,603	27.5	+2.0
Total formal votes		64,076	97.3	
Informal votes		1,769	2.7	
Turnout		65,845	95.1	
Liberal hold		Swing	+1.7	

=== New England ===
This section is an excerpt from Electoral results for the Division of New England § 1987

1987 Australian federal election: New England
Party	Candidate	Votes	%	±%
National	Ian Sinclair	33,306	50.1	−1.2
Labor	Joe Horan	24,938	37.5	−4.6
Independent	Bevan O'Regan	4,412	6.6	+6.6
Democrats	Eunice Moody	3,190	4.8	−1.8
Independent	Lance Baldwin	632	1.0	+1.0
Total formal votes		66,478	97.2	
Informal votes		1,890	2.8	
Turnout		68,368	94.2	
Two-party-preferred result
National	Ian Sinclair	38,800	58.4	+3.8
Labor	Joe Horan	27,669	41.6	−3.8
National hold		Swing	+3.8	

=== Newcastle ===
This section is an excerpt from Electoral results for the Division of Newcastle § 1987

1987 Australian federal election: Newcastle
Party	Candidate	Votes	%	±%
Labor	Allan Morris	31,095	51.5	−5.2
Independent	George Keegan	16,362	27.1	+27.1
Liberal	Alan Taggart	9,978	16.5	−1.7
Democrats	Rae Rendle	2,948	4.9	−1.1
Total formal votes		60,383	95.7	
Informal votes		2,741	4.3	
Turnout		63,124	95.2	
Notional two-party-preferred count
Labor	Allan Morris	38,670	64.1	–0.4
Liberal	Alan Taggart	21,671	35.9	–0.4
Two-candidate-preferred result
Labor	Allan Morris		55.3 (Note: Estimate based on a notional distribution of Taggart's votes.)	
Independent	George Keegan		44.7	
Labor hold		Swing	−9.2	

=== North Sydney ===
This section is an excerpt from Electoral results for the Division of North Sydney § 1987

1987 Australian federal election: North Sydney
Party	Candidate	Votes	%	±%
Liberal	John Spender	36,290	58.5	+1.5
Labor	Eddie Britt	18,303	29.5	−3.1
Democrats	Rod Dominish	7,396	11.9	+1.5
Total formal votes		61,989	96.2	
Informal votes		2,461	3.8	
Turnout		64,450	90.0	
Two-party-preferred result
Liberal	John Spender	39,815	64.2	+3.2
Labor	Eddie Britt	22,174	35.8	−3.2
Liberal hold		Swing	+3.2	

=== Page ===
This section is an excerpt from Electoral results for the Division of Page § 1987

1987 Australian federal election: Page
Party	Candidate	Votes	%	±%
National	Ian Robinson	27,756	44.2	−3.3
Labor	Trevor Ellem	21,357	34.0	−7.1
Independent	William Egerton	9,149	14.6	+14.6
Democrats	Ivor Brown	4,586	7.3	+2.4
Total formal votes		62,848	97.5	
Informal votes		1,580	2.5	
Turnout		64,428	93.4	
Two-party-preferred result
National	Ian Robinson	34,249	54.5	−0.6
Labor	Trevor Ellem	28,580	45.5	+0.6
National hold		Swing	−0.6	

=== Parkes ===
This section is an excerpt from Electoral results for the Division of Parkes § 1987

1987 Australian federal election: Parkes
Party	Candidate	Votes	%	±%
National	Michael Cobb	31,433	50.5	+22.3
Labor	Graham Lund	22,773	36.6	−4.1
Independent	Max Murford	5,272	8.5	+8.5
Democrats	Gloria Collison	2,229	3.6	+0.7
Independent	Bill O'Donnell	528	0.8	+0.8
Total formal votes		62,235	96.8	
Informal votes		2,073	3.2	
Turnout		64,308	93.1	
Two-party-preferred result
National	Michael Cobb	37,816	60.8	+4.7
Labor	Graham Lund	24,403	39.2	−4.7
National hold		Swing	+4.7	

=== Parramatta ===
This section is an excerpt from Electoral results for the Division of Parramatta § 1987

1987 Australian federal election: Parramatta
Party	Candidate	Votes	%	±%
Labor	John Brown	32,304	52.5	−5.5
Liberal	Paul Hamer	23,881	38.8	+3.8
Democrats	Rodney Levett	5,378	8.7	+1.7
Total formal votes		61,563	94.3	
Informal votes		3,727	5.7	
Turnout		65,290	94.2	
Two-party-preferred result
Labor	John Brown	34,649	56.3	−5.4
Liberal	Paul Hamer	26,914	43.7	+5.4
Labor hold		Swing	−5.4	

=== Phillip ===
This section is an excerpt from Electoral results for the Division of Phillip § 1987

1987 Australian federal election: Phillip
Party	Candidate	Votes	%	±%
Labor	Jeannette McHugh	31,552	49.1	−1.1
Liberal	Ray Collins	27,508	42.8	+1.7
Democrats	Karin Sowada	4,339	6.8	+1.3
Independent	Fred Brinkman	844	1.3	+1.3
Total formal votes		64,243	95.4	
Informal votes		3,089	4.6	
Turnout		67,332	91.0	
Two-party-preferred result
Labor	Jeannette McHugh	34,743	54.1	−0.1
Liberal	Ray Collins	29,491	45.9	+0.1
Labor hold		Swing	−0.1	

=== Prospect ===
This section is an excerpt from Electoral results for the Division of Prospect § 1987

1987 Australian federal election: Prospect
Party	Candidate	Votes	%	±%
Labor	Dick Klugman	33,367	52.2	−13.8
Liberal	Robert Ingram	18,018	28.2	+0.6
Independent	Sam Barone	9,354	14.6	+14.6
Democrats	William Utterson	3,194	5.0	−0.1
Total formal votes		63,933	92.9	
Informal votes		5,645	8.1	
Turnout		69,578	93.4	
Two-party-preferred result
Labor	Dick Klugman	40,861	63.9	−5.4
Liberal	Robert Ingram	23,038	36.1	+5.4
Labor hold		Swing	−5.4	

=== Reid ===
This section is an excerpt from Electoral results for the Division of Reid § 1987

1987 Australian federal election: Reid
Party	Candidate	Votes	%	±%
Labor	Tom Uren	35,738	58.4	−2.9
Liberal	Lynne McDowell	21,175	34.6	+5.5
Democrats	John Roveen	4,274	7.0	+2.1
Total formal votes		61,187	93.3	
Informal votes		5,099	7.7	
Turnout		66,286	93.1	
Two-party-preferred result
Labor	Tom Uren	37,839	61.8	−5.5
Liberal	Lynne McDowell	23,348	38.2	+5.5
Labor hold		Swing	−5.5	

=== Richmond ===
This section is an excerpt from Electoral results for the Division of Richmond § 1987

1987 Australian federal election: Richmond
Party	Candidate	Votes	%	±%
National	Charles Blunt	31,164	51.1	−1.5
Labor	Klaas Woldring	21,509	35.2	−1.6
Democrats	Anne Brown	4,308	7.1	+2.1
Independent	Mac Nicolson	4,061	6.7	+6.7
Total formal votes		61,042	97.5	
Informal votes		1,578	2.5	
Turnout		62,620	93.2	
Two-party-preferred result
National	Charles Blunt	34,542	56.6	−0.6
Labor	Klaas Woldring	26,500	43.4	+0.6
National hold		Swing	−0.6	

=== Riverina-Darling ===
This section is an excerpt from Electoral results for the Division of Riverina-Darling § 1987

1987 Australian federal election: Riverina-Darling
Party	Candidate	Votes	%	±%
National	Noel Hicks	32,238	53.5	+6.1
Labor	Peter Black	28,017	46.5	+2.5
Total formal votes		60,255	96.8	
Informal votes		2,002	3.2	
Turnout		62,257	94.7	
National hold		Swing	−1.1	

=== Robertson ===
This section is an excerpt from Electoral results for the Division of Robertson § 1987

1987 Australian federal election: Robertson
Party	Candidate	Votes	%	±%
Labor	Barry Cohen	31,983	49.0	−6.3
Liberal	Paul St Clair	27,220	41.7	+4.4
Democrats	Glenice Griffiths	6,132	9.4	+2.0
Total formal votes		65,335	96.4	
Informal votes		2,417	3.6	
Turnout		67,752	95.7	
Two-party-preferred result
Labor	Barry Cohen	35,645	54.6	−4.2
Liberal	Paul St Clair	29,688	45.4	+4.2
Labor hold		Swing	−4.2	

=== Shortland ===
This section is an excerpt from Electoral results for the Division of Shortland § 1987

1987 Australian federal election: Shortland
Party	Candidate	Votes	%	±%
Labor	Peter Morris	35,916	55.0	−3.2
Liberal	Milton Caine	20,652	31.6	−0.7
Democrats	Derek McCabe	8,727	13.4	+5.4
Total formal votes		64,295	95.7	
Informal votes		2,962	4.3	
Turnout		68,257	95.9	
Two-party-preferred result
Labor	Peter Morris	39,890	61.1	−2.0
Liberal	Milton Caine	25,405	38.9	+2.0
Labor hold		Swing	−2.0	

=== St George ===
This section is an excerpt from Electoral results for the Division of St George § 1987

1987 Australian federal election: St George
Party	Candidate	Votes	%	±%
Labor	Stephen Dubois	30,829	49.8	−3.2
Liberal	Gary Rush	26,869	43.4	+3.2
Democrats	Garry Dalrymple	3,241	5.2	+1.0
Independent	Brian Compton	927	1.5	+1.5
Total formal votes		61,866	93.9	
Informal votes		4,015	6.1	
Turnout		65,881	93.7	
Two-party-preferred result
Labor	Stephen Dubois	33,209	53.7	−2.8
Liberal	Gary Rush	28,651	46.3	+2.8
Labor hold		Swing	−2.8	

=== Sydney ===
This section is an excerpt from Electoral results for the Division of Sydney § 1987

1987 Australian federal election: Sydney
Party	Candidate	Votes	%	±%
Labor	Peter Baldwin	29,795	50.5	−6.7
Liberal	Les Morka	14,911	25.3	+2.6
Independent	Jack Mundey	7,918	13.4	+13.4
Democrats	William Cole	4,916	8.3	+0.2
Independent	Vito Radice	1,457	2.5	+2.5
Total formal votes		58,997	93.6	
Informal votes		4,034	6.4	
Turnout		63,031	87.9	
Two-party-preferred result
Labor	Peter Baldwin	41,220	69.9	−3.5
Liberal	Les Morka	17,746	30.1	+3.5
Labor hold		Swing	−3.5	

=== Throsby ===
This section is an excerpt from Electoral results for the Division of Throwsby § 1987

1987 Australian federal election: Throsby
Party	Candidate	Votes	%	±%
Labor	Colin Hollis	30,354	51.4	−5.7
Liberal	Neville Fredericks	20,456	34.6	+8.0
Democrats	Greg Butler	4,458	7.5	+1.9
National	David Wood	3,812	6.5	−3.0
Total formal votes		59,080	95.5	
Informal votes		2,815	4.5	
Turnout		61,895	95.7	
Two-party-preferred result
Labor	Colin Hollis	33,718	57.1	−4.6
Liberal	Neville Fredericks	25,359	42.9	+4.6
Labor hold		Swing	−4.6	

=== Warringah ===
This section is an excerpt from Electoral results for the Division of Warringah § 1987

1987 Australian federal election: Warringah
Party	Candidate	Votes	%	±%
Liberal	Michael MacKellar	37,855	59.7	+2.9
Labor	Ian Douglas	19,805	31.2	−3.4
Democrats	Christian Widmair	5,773	9.1	+2.2
Total formal votes		63,433	96.0	
Informal votes		2,609	4.0	
Turnout		66,042	92.5	
Two-party-preferred result
Liberal	Michael MacKellar	40,684	64.1	+3.4
Labor	Ian Douglas	22,748	35.9	−3.4
Liberal hold		Swing	+3.4	

=== Wentworth ===
This section is an excerpt from Electoral results for the Division of Wentworth § 1987

1987 Australian federal election: Wentworth
Party	Candidate	Votes	%	±%
Liberal	John Hewson	32,099	54.6	+2.7
Labor	Anne-Maree Whitaker	20,181	34.3	−2.0
Democrats	Yvonne Jayawardena	6,533	11.1	+3.4
Total formal votes		58,813	95.0	
Informal votes		3,116	5.0	
Turnout		61,929	89.9	
Two-party-preferred result
Liberal	John Hewson	34,101	58.0	+1.7
Labor	Anne-Maree Whitaker	24,695	42.0	−1.7
Liberal hold		Swing	+1.7	

=== Werriwa ===
This section is an excerpt from Electoral results for the Division of Werriwa § 1987

1987 Australian federal election: Werriwa
Party	Candidate	Votes	%	±%
Labor	John Kerin	43,094	63.7	+0.0
Liberal	David Brock	24,600	36.3	+7.0
Total formal votes		67,694	94.7	
Informal votes		3,798	5.3	
Turnout		71,492	95.3	
Labor hold		Swing	−3.2	

== See also ==
- Results of the 1987 Australian federal election (House of Representatives)
- Members of the Australian House of Representatives, 1987–1990
