= Results of the 1984 Australian federal election in New South Wales =

1984 Australian federal election (New South Wales)
← 1983	1 December 1984	1987 →

All 51 New South Wales seats in the Australian House of Representatives and 7 seats in the Australian Senate
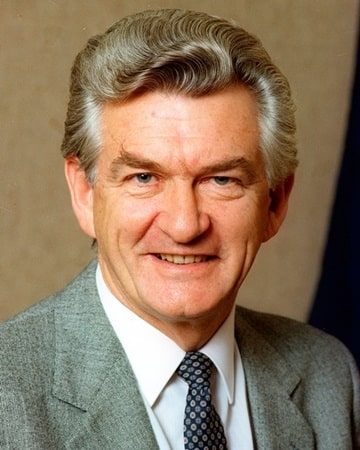

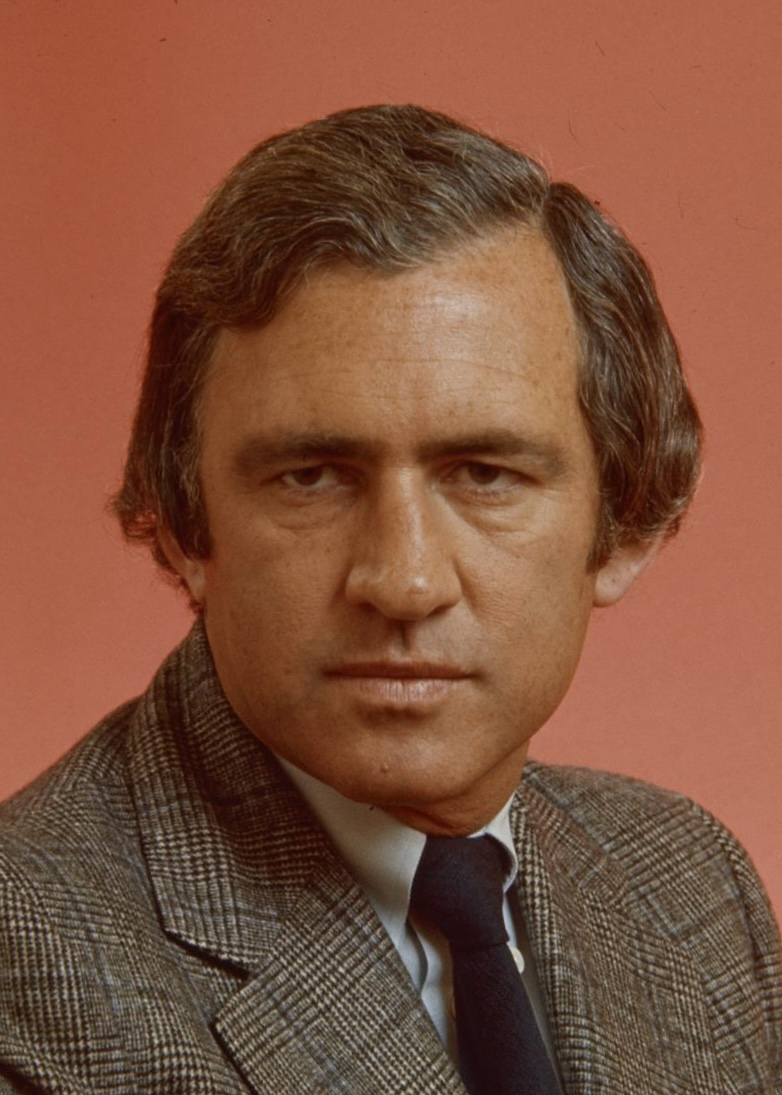
	First party	Second party
Leader	Bob Hawke	Andrew Peacock
Party	Labor	Liberal/National coalition
Last election	24 seats	19 seats
Seats won	29 seats	22 seats
Seat change	▲5	▲3
Popular vote	1,458,856	1,308,922
Percentage	48.3%	43.3%
Swing	▼1.8	▲0.7
TPP	52.91%	47.09%
TPP swing	▲1.38	▼1.38

This is a list of electoral division results for the Australian 1984 federal election in the state of New South Wales.

== Overall results ==
Turnout 94.1% (CV) — Informal 6.2%
Party	Votes	%	Swing	Seats	Change
Liberal	990,464	32.76	+1.21	12	▲1
National	318,458	10.53	–0.43	10	▲2
Liberal/National Coalition	1,308,922	43.30	+0.79	22	▲3
Labor	1,458,856	48.26	–1.86	29	▲5
Democrats	178,806	5.91	+1.12		
Independent	65,606	2.17	+1.12		
Nuclear Disarmament	5,438	0.18	+0.18		
Socialist Workers	4,261	0.14	–0.55		
Communist	1,213	0.04	–0.14		
Total	3,023,102			51	▲8
Two-party-preferred vote
Labor	1,599,219	52.91	+1.38		▲5
Liberal/National Coalition	1,423,408	47.09	–1.38		▲3
Invalid/blank votes	198,648	6.2	+4.0		
Turnout	3,221,750	94.1			
Registered voters	3,424,032				
Source: Federal Election Results 1949-1993

== Results by division ==
=== Banks ===
1984 Australian federal election: Banks
Party	Candidate	Votes	%	±%
Labor	John Mountford	35,473	57.4	+0.5
Liberal	Max Parker	21,705	35.1	−1.3
Democrats	Montague Green	4,590	7.4	+1.6
Total formal votes		61,936	93.7	−3.9
Informal votes		4,127	6.3	+3.9
Turnout		65,895	95.4	−0.3
Two-party-preferred result
Labor	John Mountford	37,908	61.4	+0.3
Liberal	Max Parker	23,858	38.6	−0.3
Labor hold		Swing	+0.3	

=== Barton ===
This section is an excerpt from Electoral results for the Division of Barton § 1984

1984 Australian federal election: Barton
Party	Candidate	Votes	%	±%
Labor	Gary Punch	31,431	48.5	+1.4
Liberal	Jim Bradfield	29,199	45.0	+1.0
Democrats	Ron George	4,209	6.5	+3.6
Total formal votes		64,839	93.9	
Informal votes		4,233	6.1	
Turnout		69,072	94.7	
Two-party-preferred result
Labor	Gary Punch	33,197	51.2	−0.2
Liberal	Jim Bradfield	31,635	48.8	+0.2
Labor hold		Swing	−0.2	

=== Bennelong ===
This section is an excerpt from Electoral results for the Division of Bennelong § 1984

1984 Australian federal election: Bennelong
Party	Candidate	Votes	%	±%
Liberal	John Howard	33,820	54.2	+6.8
Labor	Margaret Duckett	23,251	37.2	−1.2
Democrats	Steve Gabell	5,377	8.6	+8.6
Total formal votes		62,448	94.7	
Informal votes		3,470	5.3	
Turnout		65,918	94.7	
Two-party-preferred result
Liberal	John Howard	36,528	58.5	+4.7
Labor	Margaret Duckett	25,916	41.5	−4.7
Liberal hold		Swing	+4.7	

=== Berowra ===
This section is an excerpt from Electoral results for the Division of Berowra § 1984

1984 Australian federal election: Berowra
Party	Candidate	Votes	%	±%
Liberal	Harry Edwards	37,545	60.2	−0.9
Labor	Rodney Berry	19,092	30.6	+0.6
Democrats	Chris Rogers	5,777	9.3	+0.4
Total formal votes		62,414	95.9	
Informal votes		2,656	4.1	
Turnout		65,070	93.8	
Two-party-preferred result
Liberal	Harry Edwards	40,468	64.8	+0.1
Labor	Rodney Berry	21,946	35.2	−0.1
Liberal hold		Swing	+0.1	

=== Blaxland ===
This section is an excerpt from Electoral results for the Division of Blaxland § 1984

1984 Australian federal election: Blaxland
Party	Candidate	Votes	%	±%
Labor	Paul Keating	35,139	61.8	−0.9
Liberal	Bob Young	17,581	30.9	−2.0
Democrats	Samuel Adams	4,165	7.3	+3.5
Total formal votes		56,885	90.5	
Informal votes		6,006	9.5	
Turnout		62,891	94.1	
Two-party-preferred result
Labor	Paul Keating	37,646	66.2	+1.3
Liberal	Bob Young	19,197	33.8	−1.3
Labor hold		Swing	+1.3	

=== Bradfield ===
This section is an excerpt from Electoral results for the Division of Bradfield § 1984

1984 Australian federal election: Bradfield
Party	Candidate	Votes	%	±%
Liberal	David Connolly	44,901	71.5	−2.9
Labor	Matthew Strassberg	12,991	20.7	+1.9
Democrats	Emma Veitch	4,864	7.8	+1.0
Total formal votes		62,756	96.5	
Informal votes		2,271	3.5	
Turnout		65,027	94.8	
Two-party-preferred result
Liberal	David Connolly	47,333	75.5	−1.6
Labor	Matthew Strassberg	15,401	24.5	+1.6
Liberal hold		Swing	−1.6	

=== Calare ===
This section is an excerpt from Electoral results for the Division of Calare § 1984

1984 Australian federal election: Calare
Party	Candidate	Votes	%	±%
Labor	David Simmons	30,956	49.8	−1.9
National	Russ Turner	13,664	22.0	−21.8
Liberal	Ian Byrne	10,794	17.4	+17.4
Independent	Margaret Stevenson	4,596	7.4	+7.4
Democrats	Gregory Hamilton	2,101	3.4	−0.3
Total formal votes		62,111	95.4	
Informal votes		2,983	4.6	
Turnout		65,094	95.9	
Two-party-preferred result
Labor	David Simmons	34,509	55.6	+1.6
National	Russ Turner	27,588	44.4	−1.6
Labor hold		Swing	+1.6	

=== Charlton ===
This section is an excerpt from Electoral results for the Division of Charlton § 1984

1984 Australian federal election: Charlton
Party	Candidate	Votes	%	±%
Labor	Bob Brown	36,860	62.3	−4.2
Liberal	Don Harris	16,216	27.4	+3.4
Democrats	Lyn Godfrey	6,105	10.3	+2.2
Total formal votes		59,181	94.0	
Informal votes		3,750	6.0	
Turnout		62,931	95.4	
Two-party-preferred result
Labor	Bob Brown	39,827	67.3	−3.2
Liberal	Don Harris	19,354	32.7	+3.2
Labor notional hold		Swing	−3.2	

=== Chifley ===
This section is an excerpt from Electoral results for the Division of Chifley § 1984

1984 Australian federal election: Chifley
Party	Candidate	Votes	%	±%
Labor	Roger Price	34,034	66.6	+13.5
Liberal	Ken Jessup	14,115	27.6	−3.3
Democrats	Dominic Fanning	2,951	5.8	+2.8
Total formal votes		51,100	89.0	
Informal votes		6,316	11.0	
Turnout		57,416	93.3	
Two-party-preferred result
Labor	Roger Price	35,503	69.5	+5.5
Liberal	Ken Jessup	15,595	30.5	−5.5
Labor hold		Swing	+5.5	

=== Cook ===
This section is an excerpt from Electoral results for the Division of Cook § 1984

1984 Australian federal election: Cook
Party	Candidate	Votes	%	±%
Liberal	Don Dobie	32,915	52.5	+3.0
Labor	Peter McIlwaine	26,153	41.8	−6.9
Democrats	Brett Gooley	3,572	5.7	+5.7
Total formal votes		62,640	95.6	
Informal votes		2,891	4.4	
Turnout		65,531	95.4	
Two-party-preferred result
Liberal	Don Dobie	34,699	55.4	+4.8
Labor	Peter McIlwaine	27,941	44.6	−4.8
Liberal hold		Swing	+4.8	

=== Cowper ===
This section is an excerpt from Electoral results for the Division of Cowper § 1984

1984 Australian federal election: Cowper
Party	Candidate	Votes	%	±%
Labor	Joe Moran	24,672	41.1	+0.3
National	Garry Nehl	18,110	30.1	−20.4
Liberal	Peter Simpson	12,032	20.0	+20.0
Independent	David Rees	2,027	3.4	+3.4
Democrats	Alfred Tozer	1,729	2.9	−5.9
Independent	Keith Jervis	1,499	2.5	+2.5
Total formal votes		60,069	96.0	
Informal votes		2,523	4.0	
Turnout		62,592	95.4	
Two-party-preferred result
National	Garry Nehl	32,491	54.1	−0.1
Labor	Joe Moran	27,565	45.9	+0.1
National hold		Swing	−0.1	

=== Cunningham ===
This section is an excerpt from Electoral results for the Division of Cunningham § 1984

1984 Australian federal election: Cunningham
Party	Candidate	Votes	%	±%
Labor	Stewart West	35,250	62.8	+1.2
Liberal	Gayle Mitchell	14,209	25.3	−0.6
Democrats	Greg Butler	4,281	7.6	+0.8
Independent	Neil Cleary	1,221	2.2	+2.2
Independent	Rudolph Dezelin	621	1.1	+1.1
Socialist Workers	John Garcia	561	1.0	−2.8
Total formal votes		56,143	92.8	
Informal votes		4,347	7.2	
Turnout		60,490	94.8	
Two-party-preferred result
Labor	Stewart West	38,750	69.1	−0.8
Liberal	Gayle Mitchell	17,365	30.9	+0.8
Labor hold		Swing	−0.8	

=== Dobell ===
This section is an excerpt from Electoral results for the Division of Dobell § 1984

1984 Australian federal election: Dobell
Party	Candidate	Votes	%	±%
Labor	Michael Lee	31,112	56.2	−6.6
Liberal	Isaac Shields	20,114	36.3	+2.7
Democrats	Lynn Sawyer	4,168	7.5	+5.6
Total formal votes		55,394	94.0	
Informal votes		3,522	6.0	
Turnout		58,916	94.2	
Two-party-preferred result
Labor	Michael Lee	33,159	59.9	−1.1
Liberal	Isaac Shields	22,235	40.1	+1.1
Labor notional hold		Swing	−1.1	

=== Dundas ===
This section is an excerpt from Electoral results for the Division of Dundas § 1984

1984 Australian federal election: Dundas
Party	Candidate	Votes	%	±%
Liberal	Philip Ruddock	33,846	55.2	+0.6
Labor	Margaret Blaxell	22,076	36.0	−3.9
Democrats	John Tuminello	5,400	8.8	+3.3
Total formal votes		61,322	95.3	
Informal votes		3,011	4.7	
Turnout		64,333	94.3	
Two-party-preferred result
Liberal	Philip Ruddock	36,099	58.9	+2.1
Labor	Margaret Blaxell	25,223	41.1	−2.1
Liberal hold		Swing	+2.1	

=== Eden-Monaro ===
This section is an excerpt from Electoral results for the Division of Eden-Monaro § 1984

1984 Australian federal election: Eden-Monaro
Party	Candidate	Votes	%	±%
Labor	Jim Snow	26,131	47.2	−1.5
Liberal	Murray Sainsbury	23,675	42.7	−2.4
Nuclear Disarmament	Bob Shumack	3,435	6.2	+6.2
National	Alexander Black	2,178	3.9	+3.9
Total formal votes		55,419	95.5	
Informal votes		2,625	4.5	
Turnout		58,044	93.7	
Two-party-preferred result
Labor	Jim Snow	28,808	52.0	+0.6
Liberal	Murray Sainsbury	26,606	48.0	−0.6
Labor hold		Swing	+0.6	

=== Farrer ===
This section is an excerpt from Electoral results for the Division of Farrer § 1984

1984 Australian federal election: Farrer
Party	Candidate	Votes	%	±%
National	Tim Fischer	26,986	43.4	+26.8
Labor	Eric Thomas	22,238	35.8	−5.2
Liberal	John Roach	12,915	20.8	−20.6
Total formal votes		62,139	95.9	
Informal votes		2,638	4.1	
Turnout		64,777	94.9	
Two-party-preferred result
National	Tim Fischer	39,116	63.0	+63.0
Labor	Eric Thomas	23,020	37.0	−5.6
National gain from Liberal		Swing	+63.0	

=== Fowler ===
This section is an excerpt from Electoral results for the Division of Fowler § 1984

1984 Australian federal election: Fowler
Party	Candidate	Votes	%	±%
Labor	Ted Grace	34,075	66.9	+2.6
Liberal	Ken Wills	13,781	27.1	−2.0
Independent	David Bransdon	3,065	6.0	+6.0
Total formal votes		50,921	87.9	
Informal votes		7,001	12.1	
Turnout		57,922	92.4	
Two-party-preferred result
Labor	Ted Grace	35,804	70.3	+3.3
Liberal	Ken Wills	15,104	29.7	−3.3
Labor notional hold		Swing	+3.3	

=== Gilmore ===
This section is an excerpt from Electoral results for the Division of Gilmore § 1984

1984 Australian federal election: Gilmore
Party	Candidate	Votes	%	±%
Labor	Bob Stephens	25,812	44.4	−1.6
National	John Sharp	16,463	28.3	+13.8
Liberal	Noel Anderson	12,213	21.0	−11.9
Nuclear Disarmament	Rodney Lander	2,003	3.4	+3.4
Democrats	John Sanders	1,595	2.7	−1.6
Independent	Ronald Sarina	114	0.2	+0.2
Total formal votes		58,200	95.9	
Informal votes		2,458	4.1	
Turnout		60,658	94.8	
Two-party-preferred result
National	John Sharp	29,800	51.2	+51.2
Labor	Bob Stephens	28,378	48.8	−1.7
National notional gain from Labor		Swing	+1.7	

=== Grayndler ===
This section is an excerpt from Electoral results for the Division of Grayndler § 1984

1984 Australian federal election: Grayndler
Party	Candidate	Votes	%	±%
Labor	Leo McLeay	34,847	60.3	+5.5
Liberal	John Marsden-Lynch	16,908	29.3	−4.5
Democrats	Peter Hennessy	3,090	5.4	+2.3
Socialist Workers	Christine Broi	2,909	5.0	+4.3
Total formal votes		57,754	88.6	
Informal votes		7,418	11.4	
Turnout		65,172	91.7	
Two-party-preferred result
Labor	Leo McLeay	37,464	64.9	+1.8
Liberal	John Marsden-Lynch	20,262	35.1	−1.8
Labor hold		Swing	+1.8	

=== Greenway ===
This section is an excerpt from Electoral results for the Division of Greenway § 1984

1984 Australian federal election: Greenway
Party	Candidate	Votes	%	±%
Labor	Russ Gorman	31,384	56.8	−1.9
Liberal	Edna Mitchell	15,765	28.5	−1.6
Independent	Michael Corbin	5,557	10.1	+10.1
Independent	Ray Eade	2,557	4.6	+4.6
Total formal votes		55,263	91.3	
Informal votes		5,249	8.7	
Turnout		60,512	93.7	
Two-party-preferred result
Labor	Russ Gorman	35,263	63.8	−1.6
Liberal	Edna Mitchell	19,975	36.2	+1.6
Labor notional hold		Swing	−1.6	

=== Gwydir ===
This section is an excerpt from Electoral results for the Division of Gwydir § 1984

1984 Australian federal election: Gwydir
Party	Candidate	Votes	%	±%
National	Ralph Hunt	33,988	54.7	−1.2
Labor	Pamela Smith	25,271	40.6	+4.1
Democrats	Lyall Munro Jnr	1,958	3.1	−2.3
Independent	John Brazier	968	1.6	+1.6
Total formal votes		62,185	96.4	
Informal votes		2,331	3.6	
Turnout		64,516	94.5	
Two-party-preferred result
National	Ralph Hunt	35,634	57.3	−2.6
Labor	Pamela Smith	26,587	42.7	+2.6
National hold		Swing	−2.6	

=== Hughes ===
This section is an excerpt from Electoral results for the Division of Hughes § 1984

1984 Australian federal election: Hughes
Party	Candidate	Votes	%	±%
Labor	Robert Tickner	30,224	52.5	−1.9
Liberal	Cliff Mason	22,790	39.6	+4.0
Democrats	Harold Jeffrey	4,058	7.0	−2.1
Independent	Marjorie Wisby	497	0.9	+0.9
Total formal votes		57,569	95.2	
Informal votes		2,890	4.8	
Turnout		60,459	96.1	
Two-party-preferred result
Labor	Robert Tickner	32,517	56.5	−4.6
Liberal	Cliff Mason	25,052	43.5	+4.6
Labor hold		Swing	−4.6	

=== Hume ===
This section is an excerpt from Electoral results for the Division of Hume § 1984

1984 Australian federal election: Hume
Party	Candidate	Votes	%	±%
Labor	Rodney Milliken	24,342	39.3	−3.7
Liberal	Wal Fife	19,331	31.2	+7.3
National	Stephen Lusher	18,245	29.5	−1.2
Total formal votes		61,918	96.5	
Informal votes		2,275	3.5	
Turnout		64,193	95.4	
Two-party-preferred result
Liberal	Wal Fife	35,695	57.7	+57.7
Labor	Rodney Milliken	26,221	42.3	−3.4
Liberal gain from National		Swing	+57.7	

=== Hunter ===
This section is an excerpt from Electoral results for the Division of Hunter § 1984

1984 Australian federal election: Hunter
Party	Candidate	Votes	%	±%
Labor	Eric Fitzgibbon	28,589	47.3	−3.2
Liberal	Ron Dolton	16,483	27.3	+20.8
National	John Turner	12,420	20.5	−14.3
Democrats	Warren Reid	2,952	4.9	−2.6
Total formal votes		60,444	95.1	
Informal votes		3,101	4.9	
Turnout		63,545	95.7	
Two-party-preferred result
Labor	Eric Fitzgibbon	31,642	52.4	−2.6
Liberal	Ron Dolton	28,789	47.6	+47.6
Labor hold		Swing	−2.6	

=== Kingsford Smith ===
This section is an excerpt from Electoral results for the Division of Kingsford Smith § 1984

1984 Australian federal election: Kingsford-Smith
Party	Candidate	Votes	%	±%
Labor	Lionel Bowen	37,979	62.9	−6.6
Liberal	Collin O'Neill	15,526	25.7	−0.3
Democrats	Peter Longfield	4,519	7.5	+4.4
Independent	Helen Boyle	2,321	3.8	+3.8
Total formal votes		60,345	90.0	
Informal votes		6,713	10.0	
Turnout		67,058	93.0	
Two-party-preferred result
Labor	Lionel Bowen	42,777	70.9	−1.7
Liberal	Collin O'Neill	17,551	29.1	+1.7
Labor hold		Swing	−1.7	

=== Lindsay ===
This section is an excerpt from Electoral results for the Division of Lindsay § 1984

1984 Australian federal election: Lindsay
Party	Candidate	Votes	%	±%
Labor	Ross Free	32,609	57.5	−1.3
Liberal	Stuart Coppock	19,383	34.2	+0.0
Democrats	Kevin Crameri	4,683	8.3	+1.4
Total formal votes		56,675	92.8	
Informal votes		4,380	7.2	
Turnout		61,055	94.5	
Two-party-preferred result
Labor	Ross Free	34,885	61.6	−0.7
Liberal	Stuart Coppock	21,790	38.4	+0.7
Labor notional hold		Swing	−0.7	

=== Lowe ===
This section is an excerpt from Electoral results for the Division of Lowe § 1984

1984 Australian federal election: Lowe
Party	Candidate	Votes	%	±%
Labor	Michael Maher	30,483	49.4	−1.1
Liberal	Geoffrey Howe	26,812	43.5	−0.4
Democrats	Kent Buncombe	4,400	7.1	+4.0
Total formal votes		61,695	92.3	
Informal votes		5,118	7.7	
Turnout		66,813	93.6	
Two-party-preferred result
Labor	Michael Maher	32,215	52.2	−2.3
Liberal	Geoffrey Howe	29,472	47.8	+2.3
Labor hold		Swing	−2.3	

=== Lyne ===
This section is an excerpt from Electoral results for the Division of Lyne § 1984

1984 Australian federal election: Lyne
Party	Candidate	Votes	%	±%
National	Bruce Cowan	31,801	53.2	+0.3
Labor	Fred May	23,707	39.7	+2.1
Democrats	Roland Inman	3,401	5.7	+0.7
Independent	Stewart Cooper	863	1.4	+1.4
Total formal votes		59,772	95.4	
Informal votes		2,857	4.6	
Turnout		62,629	95.4	
Two-party-preferred result
National	Bruce Cowan	33,955	56.8	−2.4
Labor	Fred May	25,814	43.2	+2.4
National hold		Swing	−2.4	

=== Macarthur ===
This section is an excerpt from Electoral results for the Division of Macarthur § 1984

1984 Australian federal election: Macarthur
Party	Candidate	Votes	%	±%
Labor	Stephen Martin	31,100	55.5	−4.8
Liberal	Mark Stanham	18,521	33.0	−1.7
Democrats	Meg Sampson	6,421	11.5	+7.1
Total formal votes		56,042	93.2	
Informal votes		4,079	6.8	
Turnout		60,121	95.1	
Two-party-preferred result
Labor	Stephen Martin	34,920	62.3	−0.6
Liberal	Mark Stanham	21,115	37.7	+0.6
Labor hold		Swing	−0.6	

=== Mackellar ===
This section is an excerpt from Electoral results for the Division of Mackellar § 1984

1984 Australian federal election: Mackellar
Party	Candidate	Votes	%	±%
Liberal	Jim Carlton	31,875	54.1	−2.5
Labor	Tim Cusack	20,614	35.0	−0.9
Democrats	Graeme Maclennan	5,472	9.3	+3.1
Independent	Maurice Foley	977	1.7	+0.5
Total formal votes		58,938	94.1	
Informal votes		3,690	5.9	
Turnout		62,628	93.5	
Two-party-preferred result
Liberal	Jim Carlton	35,436	60.1	+0.4
Labor	Tim Cusack	23,500	39.9	−0.4
Liberal hold		Swing	+0.4	

=== Macquarie ===
This section is an excerpt from Electoral results for the Division of Macquarie § 1984

1984 Australian federal election: Macquarie
Party	Candidate	Votes	%	±%
Liberal	Alasdair Webster	22,796	41.1	−5.5
Labor	Garry Cronan	22,565	40.6	−1.9
Democrats	Dick Jackson-Hope	4,053	7.3	−0.2
Independent	Peter Quirk	3,069	5.5	+5.5
National	Paul McGirr	3,036	5.5	+5.5
Total formal votes		55,519	94.8	
Informal votes		3,052	5.2	
Turnout		58,571	93.5	
Two-party-preferred result
Liberal	Alasdair Webster	28,529	51.4	+1.9
Labor	Garry Cronan	26,981	48.6	−1.9
Liberal gain from Labor		Swing	+1.9	

=== Mitchell ===
This section is an excerpt from Electoral results for the Division of Mitchell § 1984

1984 Australian federal election: Mitchell
Party	Candidate	Votes	%	±%
Liberal	Alan Cadman	37,568	67.5	+0.8
Labor	Edward Mason	14,188	25.5	−2.5
Democrats	Alan Page	3,928	7.1	+1.8
Total formal votes		55,684	95.8	
Informal votes		2,427	4.2	
Turnout		58,111	94.9	
Two-party-preferred result
Liberal	Alan Cadman	39,411	70.8	+2.0
Labor	Edward Mason	16,273	29.2	−2.0
Liberal hold		Swing	+2.0	

=== New England ===
This section is an excerpt from Electoral results for the Division of New England § 1984

1984 Australian federal election: New England
Party	Candidate	Votes	%	±%
National	Ian Sinclair	33,356	51.3	+1.3
Labor	Joe Horan	27,413	42.1	−2.2
Democrats	Rod Irvine	4,287	6.6	+0.9
Total formal votes		65,056	96.8	
Informal votes		2,170	3.2	
Turnout		67,226	95.5	
Two-party-preferred result
National	Ian Sinclair	35,494	54.6	+1.7
Labor	Joe Horan	29,562	45.4	−1.7
National hold		Swing	+1.7	

=== Newcastle ===
This section is an excerpt from Electoral results for the Division of Newcastle1984

1984 Australian federal election: Newcastle
Party	Candidate	Votes	%	±%
Labor	Allan Morris	33,715	56.7	−6.0
Liberal	Ashley Saunders	10,840	18.2	−6.0
Independent	Don Geddes	10,460	17.6	+17.6
Democrats	Steve Jeffries	3,570	6.0	+1.5
Independent	Jim Campbell	837	1.4	+1.4
Total formal votes		59,422	94.1	
Informal votes		3,705	5.9	
Turnout		63,127	95.2	
Two-party-preferred result
Labor	Allan Morris	38,283	64.5	−6.1
Liberal	Ashley Saunders	21,076	35.5	+6.1
Labor hold		Swing	−6.1	

=== North Sydney ===
This section is an excerpt from Electoral results for the Division of North Sydney § 1984

1984 Australian federal election: North Sydney
Party	Candidate	Votes	%	±%
Liberal	John Spender	34,579	57.0	−1.8
Labor	Philip Kelso	19,780	32.6	−0.4
Democrats	Rod Dominish	6,331	10.4	+2.3
Total formal votes		60,690	95.0	
Informal votes		3,190	5.0	
Turnout		63,880	91.6	
Two-party-preferred result
Liberal	John Spender	37,020	61.0	−0.6
Labor	Philip Kelso	23,666	39.0	+0.6
Liberal hold		Swing	−0.6	

=== Page ===
This section is an excerpt from Electoral results for the Division of Page § 1984

1984 Australian federal election: Page
Party	Candidate	Votes	%	±%
National	Ian Robinson	27,883	47.5	−4.0
Labor	Brian Morris	24,144	41.1	+0.0
Independent	Brian Stone	3,800	6.5	+6.5
Democrats	Anne Brown	2,875	4.9	−2.3
Total formal votes		58,702	96.5	
Informal votes		2,096	3.5	
Turnout		60,798	94.6	
Two-party-preferred result
National	Ian Robinson	32,341	55.1	+0.4
Labor	Brian Morris	26,356	44.9	−0.4
National notional hold		Swing	+0.4	

=== Parkes ===
This section is an excerpt from Electoral results for the Division of Parkes § 1984

1984 Australian federal election: Parkes
Party	Candidate	Votes	%	±%
Labor	James Curran	25,097	40.7	+0.8
National	Michael Cobb	17,407	28.2	−26.9
Liberal	Bruce Rowley	17,327	28.1	+28.1
Democrats	Gloria Collison	1,815	2.9	−1.6
Total formal votes		61,646	95.9	
Informal votes		2,630	4.1	
Turnout		64,276	94.6	
Two-party-preferred result
National	Michael Cobb	34,590	56.1	−1.2
Labor	James Curran	27,051	43.9	+1.2
National notional hold		Swing	−1.2	

=== Parramatta ===
This section is an excerpt from Electoral results for the Division of Parramatta § 1984

1984 Australian federal election: Parramatta
Party	Candidate	Votes	%	±%
Labor	John Brown	35,077	58.0	+1.5
Liberal	Charles Stanley	21,176	35.0	−1.3
Democrats	John Butterworth	4,256	7.0	+2.0
Total formal votes		60,509	92.6	
Informal votes		4,819	7.4	
Turnout		65,328	93.4	
Two-party-preferred result
Labor	John Brown	37,307	61.7	+0.2
Liberal	Charles Stanley	23,201	38.3	−0.2
Labor hold		Swing	+0.2	

=== Phillip ===
This section is an excerpt from Electoral results for the Division of Phillip § 1984

1984 Australian federal election: Phillip
Party	Candidate	Votes	%	±%
Labor	Jeannette McHugh	31,601	50.2	+0.4
Liberal	Peter Bardos	25,911	41.1	−5.2
Democrats	Karin Sowada	3,469	5.5	+2.7
Independent	Donald Rugless	1,326	2.1	+2.1
Independent	Fred Brinkman	685	1.1	+1.1
Total formal votes		62,992	93.0	
Informal votes		4,722	7.0	
Turnout		67,714	91.1	
Two-party-preferred result
Labor	Jeannette McHugh	34,163	54.2	+2.2
Liberal	Peter Bardos	28,817	45.8	−2.2
Labor hold		Swing	+2.2	

=== Prospect ===
This section is an excerpt from Electoral results for the Division of Prospect § 1984

1984 Australian federal election: Prospect
Party	Candidate	Votes	%	±%
Labor	Dick Klugman	38,475	66.0	+0.9
Liberal	Adrian Burke	16,085	27.6	−4.5
Democrats	Robert Neesam	2,987	5.1	+5.1
Socialist Workers	Dick Nichols	791	1.4	−0.4
Total formal votes		58,338	89.4	
Informal votes		6,932	10.6	
Turnout		65,270	92.8	
Two-party-preferred result
Labor	Dick Klugman	40,474	69.4	+2.2
Liberal	Adrian Burke	17,841	30.6	−2.2
Labor hold		Swing	+2.2	

=== Reid ===
This section is an excerpt from Electoral results for the Division of Reid § 1984

1984 Australian federal election: Reid
Party	Candidate	Votes	%	±%
Labor	Tom Uren	36,384	61.3	+1.0
Liberal	Mary-Ruth Kain	17,269	29.1	−0.2
Democrats	John Roveen	2,936	4.9	−2.9
Independent	Jim Saleam	2,803	4.7	+4.7
Total formal votes		59,392	90.5	
Informal votes		6,208	9.5	
Turnout		65,600	93.6	
Two-party-preferred result
Labor	Tom Uren	39,947	67.3	+1.1
Liberal	Mary-Ruth Kain	19,445	32.7	−1.1
Labor hold		Swing	+1.1	

=== Richmond ===
This section is an excerpt from Electoral results for the Division of Richmond § 1984

1984 Australian federal election: Richmond
Party	Candidate	Votes	%	±%
National	Charles Blunt	29,364	52.6	+0.1
Labor	Klaas Woldring	20,565	36.8	−3.4
Democrats	Ivor Brown	2,814	5.0	−2.3
Independent	Jim Saunders	2,238	4.0	+4.0
Independent	Jon Axens	866	1.6	+1.6
Total formal votes		55,847	96.4	
Informal votes		2,083	3.6	
Turnout		57,930	94.8	
Two-party-preferred result
National	Charles Blunt	31,917	57.2	+1.8
Labor	Klaas Woldring	23,930	42.8	−1.8
National hold		Swing	+1.8	

=== Riverina-Darling ===
This section is an excerpt from Electoral results for the Division of Riverina-Darling § 1984

1984 Australian federal election: Riverina-Darling
Party	Candidate	Votes	%	±%
National	Noel Hicks	28,316	47.4	+0.0
Labor	Ron Adams	26,304	44.0	−5.9
Liberal	John Sullivan	3,936	6.6	+6.5
Democrats	Peter Hains	969	1.6	−1.0
Independent	Frederick Martin	276	0.5	+0.5
Total formal votes		59,801	94.9	
Informal votes		3,228	5.1	
Turnout		63,029	93.6	
Two-party-preferred result
National	Noel Hicks	32,642	54.6	+5.9
Labor	Ron Adams	27,146	45.4	−5.9
National notional gain from Labor		Swing	+5.9	

=== Robertson ===
This section is an excerpt from Electoral results for the Division of Robertson § 1984

1984 Australian federal election: Robertson
Party	Candidate	Votes	%	±%
Labor	Barry Cohen	32,165	55.3	+1.0
Liberal	Peter Jansen	21,674	37.3	−1.2
Democrats	Trevor Willsher	4,325	7.4	+0.0
Total formal votes		58,164	95.2	
Informal votes		2,920	4.8	
Turnout		61,084	94.9	
Two-party-preferred result
Labor	Barry Cohen	34,073	58.6	+0.0
Liberal	Peter Jansen	24,091	41.4	+0.0
Labor hold		Swing	+0.0	

=== Shortland ===
This section is an excerpt from Electoral results for the Division of Shortland § 1984

1984 Australian federal election: Shortland
Party	Candidate	Votes	%	±%
Labor	Peter Morris	36,855	58.2	−1.0
Liberal	Milton Caine	20,459	32.3	+2.4
Democrats	John Aitken	5,058	8.0	+2.0
Independent	Jane Power	1,005	1.6	+1.6
Total formal votes		63,377	94.4	
Informal votes		3,794	5.6	
Turnout		67,171	96.0	
Two-party-preferred result
Labor	Peter Morris	40,005	63.1	−4.2
Liberal	Milton Caine	23,370	36.9	+4.2
Labor hold		Swing	−4.2	

=== St George ===
This section is an excerpt from Electoral results for the Division of St George § 1984

1984 Australian federal election: St George
Party	Candidate	Votes	%	±%
Labor	Stephen Dubois	32,417	53.0	−4.7
Liberal	Bob Gemell	24,612	40.2	+3.3
Democrats	Paul Terrett	2,599	4.2	+2.3
Independent	Stanley Duncan	1,008	1.6	+1.6
Independent	Brian Compton	521	0.9	+0.9
Total formal votes		61,157	92.2	
Informal votes		5,206	7.8	
Turnout		66,363	94.6	
Two-party-preferred result
Labor	Stephen Dubois	34,560	56.5	−3.9
Liberal	Bob Gemell	26,587	43.5	+3.9
Labor hold		Swing	−3.9	

=== Sydney ===
This section is an excerpt from Electoral results for the Division of Sydney § 1984

1984 Australian federal election: Sydney
Party	Candidate	Votes	%	±%
Labor	Peter Baldwin	32,412	57.2	−7.0
Liberal	James Harker-Mortlock	12,847	22.7	+1.2
Democrats	Michael Walsh	4,600	8.1	+1.0
Independent	Daphne Gollan	3,118	5.5	+5.5
Independent	Vito Radice	2,219	3.9	+3.9
Communist	Aileen Beaver	1,213	2.1	−1.3
Independent	Noel Hazard	290	0.5	+0.5
Total formal votes		56,699	89.6	
Informal votes		6,601	10.4	
Turnout		63,300	90.2	
Two-party-preferred result
Labor	Peter Baldwin	41,590	73.4	+0.7
Liberal	James Harker-Mortlock	15,095	26.6	−0.7
Labor hold		Swing	+0.7	

=== Throsby ===
This section is an excerpt from Electoral results for the Division of Throwsby § 1984

1984 Australian federal election: Throsby
Party	Candidate	Votes	%	±%
Labor	Colin Hollis	31,472	57.1	+2.0
Liberal	Wendy Stubbs	14,648	26.6	−11.2
National	Duncan Gair	5,241	9.5	+9.5
Democrats	Alan Cole	3,095	5.6	+0.9
Independent	Paul Trevardis	399	0.7	+0.7
Independent	Martin Essenberg	298	0.5	+0.5
Total formal votes		55,153	94.9	
Informal votes		2,975	5.1	
Turnout		58,128	94.9	
Two-party-preferred result
Labor	Colin Hollis	33,989	61.7	+2.7
Liberal	Wendy Stubbs	21,139	38.3	−2.7
Labor notional hold		Swing	+2.7	

=== Warringah ===
This section is an excerpt from Electoral results for the Division of Warringah § 1984

1984 Australian federal election: Warringah
Party	Candidate	Votes	%	±%
Liberal	Michael MacKellar	36,415	56.8	−0.7
Labor	Brian Green	22,188	34.6	−3.2
Democrats	Richard Jones	4,444	6.9	+3.1
Independent	Margaret Broome	1,100	1.7	+1.7
Total formal votes		64,147	94.8	
Informal votes		3,518	5.2	
Turnout		67,665	93.1	
Two-party-preferred result
Liberal	Michael MacKellar	38,908	60.7	+1.0
Labor	Brian Green	25,233	39.3	−1.0
Liberal hold		Swing	+1.0	

=== Wentworth ===
This section is an excerpt from Electoral results for the Division of Wentworth § 1984

1984 Australian federal election: Wentworth
Party	Candidate	Votes	%	±%
Liberal	Peter Coleman	30,389	51.9	+3.9
Labor	Stephen Rothman	21,252	36.3	−5.3
Democrats	Yvonne Jayawardena	4,478	7.7	+3.4
Independent	George Warnecke	1,591	2.7	+2.7
Independent	George Atkinson	410	0.7	+0.7
Independent	Roy Oakes	242	0.4	+0.4
Independent	Kusala Fitzroy-Mendis	162	0.3	+0.3
Total formal votes		58,524	92.9	
Informal votes		4,441	7.1	
Turnout		62,965	89.4	
Two-party-preferred result
Liberal	Peter Coleman	32,902	56.3	+0.6
Labor	Stephen Rothman	25,587	43.7	−0.6
Liberal hold		Swing	+0.6	

=== Werriwa ===
This section is an excerpt from Electoral results for the Division of Werriwa § 1984

1984 Australian federal election: Werriwa
Party	Candidate	Votes	%	±%
Labor	John Kerin	36,892	63.7	+3.6
Liberal	Peter Swiderski	16,963	29.3	−2.1
Democrats	Valerie George	4,079	7.0	+7.0
Total formal votes		57,934	92.1	
Informal votes		5,002	7.9	
Turnout		62,936	93.5	
Two-party-preferred result
Labor	John Kerin	38,737	66.9	−0.9
Liberal	Peter Swiderski	19,195	33.1	+0.9
Labor hold		Swing	−0.9	

== See also ==
- Results of the 1984 Australian federal election (House of Representatives)
- Members of the Australian House of Representatives, 1984–1987
