= Results of the 1990 Australian federal election in New South Wales =

1990 Australian federal election (New South Wales)
- 24 March 1990

All 51 New South Wales seats in the Australian House of Representatives and 6 seats in the Australian Senate
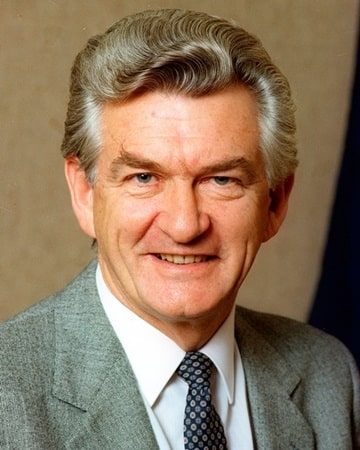

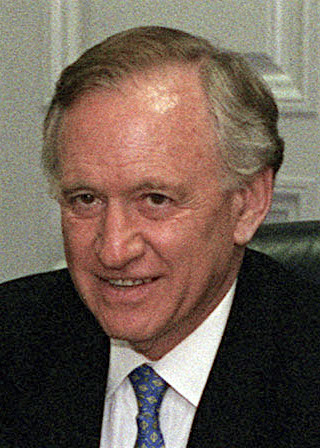
	First party	Second party
Leader	Bob Hawke	Andrew Peacock
Party	Labor	Liberal/National coalition
Last election	28 seats	23 seats
Seats won	30 seats	20 seats
Seat change	▲2	▼3
Popular vote	1,380,780	1,352,770
Percentage	41.16%	40.32%
Swing	▲4.0	▼4.7
TPP	51.94%	48.61%
TPP swing	▲1.65	▼1.65

This is a list of electoral division results for the Australian 1990 federal election in the state of New South Wales.

== Overall results ==
Turnout 95.4% (CV) — Informal 3.1%
Party	Votes	%	Swing	Seats	Change
Liberal	975,083	32.76	−4.19	12	▼1
National	377,687	10.53	−0.52	8	▼2
Liberal/National Coalition	1,352,770	40.32	−4.72	20	▼3
Labor	1,380,780	41.16	+4.01	30	▲2
Democrats	342,540	10.21	+6.34		
Independents (Note: The independent member was Ted Mack (North Sydney). The unregistered Centre Unity Party has been included with the independents.)	166,832	4.97	+1.55	1	▲1
Green Alliance (Note: At this election the Greens were a loose alliance largely organised by local groups, with 18 candidates running under a variety of names: Australian Gruen Party (Fowler, Macarthur, Mackellar, Macquarie, Prospect, St George, Throsby and Werriwa), the Greens (Phillip and Wentworth), Illawarra Greens (Cunningham and Hughes), Sydney Greens, South Sydney Greens (Kingsford Smith), Central Coast Green Party (Dobell and Robertson), Greens in Lowe and Cowper Greens.)	45,819	1.37			
Call to Australia	21,646	0.65			
Independent EFF	9,375	0.28			
Rex Connor Labor	8,277	0.25			
New Australia	6,376	0.19			
Democratic Socialist	5,809	0.17			
Grey Power	5,034	0.15			
Environment Inds	4,866	0.15			
Nuclear Disarmament	3,210	0.10	+0.07		
Socialist	1,337	0.04			
Total	3,354,671			51	
Two-party-preferred vote
Labor	1,706,398	51.94	+1.65		▲2
Liberal/National Coalition	1,578,738	48.06	–1.65		▼3
Invalid/blank votes	108,134	3.1	–1.5		
Turnout	3,462,805	95.4			
Registered voters	3,630,841				
Source: Federal Elections 1990

== Results by division ==
=== Banks ===
This section is an excerpt from Electoral results for the Division of Banks § 1990

1990 Australian federal election: Banks
Party	Candidate	Votes	%	±%
Labor	Daryl Melham	30,484	48.6	−4.2
Liberal	Steve Pratt	21,957	35.0	−4.4
Democrats	Paul Terrett	7,400	11.8	+4.0
Call to Australia	Ian Clipsham	1,415	2.3	+2.3
Independent	John Hay	671	1.1	+1.1
Independent	Brian Meyer	483	0.8	+0.8
Democratic Socialist	Graeme Robinson	354	0.6	+0.6
Total formal votes		62,764	96.4	+1.0
Informal votes		2,367	3.6	−1.0
Turnout		65,131	96.2	−0.3
Two-party-preferred result
Labor	Daryl Melham	36,233	57.9	+1.1
Liberal	Steve Pratt	26,379	42.1	−1.1
Labor hold		Swing	+1.1	

=== Barton ===
This section is an excerpt from Electoral results for the Division of Barton § 1990

1990 Australian federal election: Barton
Party	Candidate	Votes	%	±%
Labor	Gary Punch	29,530	45.1	−3.4
Liberal	David Macauley	27,238	41.6	−3.4
Democrats	Ron George	4,840	7.4	+7.4
Call to Australia	Cathy Mudie	968	1.5	+1.5
Independent	Max Lindon	941	1.4	+1.4
Grey Power	Noel Said	827	1.3	+1.3
Independent	Joe Hardy	808	1.2	+1.2
Democratic Socialist	Rosemary McCann	397	0.6	+0.6
Total formal votes		65,549	96.6	
Informal votes		2,289	3.4	
Turnout		67,838	95.9	
Two-party-preferred result
Labor	Gary Punch	34,752	53.1	+2.1
Liberal	David Macauley	30,640	46.9	−2.1
Labor hold		Swing	+2.1	

=== Bennelong ===
This section is an excerpt from Electoral results for the Division of Bennelong § 1990

1990 Australian federal election: Bennelong
Party	Candidate	Votes	%	±%
Liberal	John Howard	33,862	52.8	−4.1
Labor	Martin Claridge	18,363	28.6	−5.2
Democrats	Bob Springett	5,827	9.1	+1.9
Independent	Judy Messer	3,381	5.3	+5.3
Nuclear Disarmament	Hugh Pitty	1,399	2.2	+2.2
Call to Australia	Robyn Peebles	893	1.4	+1.4
Independent	John Dawson	372	0.6	−0.3
Total formal votes		64,097	97.0	
Informal votes		1,962	3.0	
Turnout		66,059	95.5	
Two-party-preferred result
Liberal	John Howard	38,574	60.3	−0.3
Labor	Martin Claridge	25,363	39.7	+0.3
Liberal hold		Swing	−0.3	

=== Berowra ===
This section is an excerpt from Electoral results for the Division of Berowra § 1990

1990 Australian federal election: Berowra
Party	Candidate	Votes	%	±%
Liberal	Harry Edwards	34,720	52.4	−10.0
Labor	Sue Deane	16,089	24.3	−3.8
Democrats	Martyn Yeomans	11,070	16.7	+7.2
Independent	Mick Gallagher	2,103	3.2	+3.2
Call to Australia	Benille Varidel	1,471	2.2	+2.2
Independent	Les Paul	837	1.3	+1.3
Total formal votes		66,290	97.7	
Informal votes		1,572	2.3	
Turnout		67,862	95.8	
Two-party-preferred result
Liberal	Harry Edwards	41,466	62.8	−3.9
Labor	Sue Deane	24,592	37.2	+3.9
Liberal hold		Swing	−3.9	

=== Blaxland ===
This section is an excerpt from Electoral results for the Division of Blaxland § 1990

1990 Australian federal election: Blaxland
Party	Candidate	Votes	%	±%
Labor	Paul Keating	33,780	55.3	+2.1
Liberal	David Voight	19,243	31.5	−2.1
Democrats	Fiona Richardson	5,382	8.8	+5.0
Independent	Mohamad Arja	1,313	2.1	+2.1
Democratic Socialist	Stephanie Miller	707	1.2	+1.2
New Australia	Michael Irsak	646	1.1	+1.1
Total formal votes		61,071	94.5	
Informal votes		3,567	5.5	
Turnout		64,638	95.0	
Two-party-preferred result
Labor	Paul Keating	37,887	62.2	+3.4
Liberal	David Voight	23,056	37.8	−3.4
Labor hold		Swing	+3.4	

=== Bradfield ===
This section is an excerpt from Electoral results for the Division of Bradfield § 1990

1990 Australian federal election: Bradfield
Party	Candidate	Votes	%	±%
Liberal	David Connolly	41,250	63.6	−8.0
Labor	Adam McCarthy	11,898	18.3	−1.1
Democrats	Henry Long	7,496	11.6	+2.6
Nuclear Disarmament	Giovanna Trenoweth	1,811	2.8	+2.8
Independent	Anthony Hardwick	1,483	2.3	+2.3
Independent	Alan Jacobs	957	1.5	+1.5
Total formal votes		64,895	97.9	
Informal votes		1,376	2.1	
Turnout		66,271	95.6	
Two-party-preferred result
Liberal	David Connolly	46,796	72.3	−3.8
Labor	Adam McCarthy	17,913	27.7	+3.8
Liberal hold		Swing	−3.8	

=== Calare ===
This section is an excerpt from Electoral results for the Division of Calare § 1990

1990 Australian federal election: Calare
Party	Candidate	Votes	%	±%
Labor	David Simmons	31,645	46.2	−2.7
National	Joanne Lewis	16,229	23.7	+2.8
Liberal	John Loneregan	13,387	19.5	−5.5
Democrats	Steve Adams	3,759	5.5	+1.3
Independent	Mike Phillips	1,814	2.6	+2.6
Independent EFF	Brian Davis	1,706	2.5	+2.5
Total formal votes		68,540	97.9	
Informal votes		1,487	2.1	
Turnout		70,027	96.3	
Two-party-preferred result
Labor	David Simmons	36,578	53.5	+0.2
National	Joanne Lewis	31,824	46.5	−0.2
Labor hold		Swing	+0.2	

=== Charlton ===
This section is an excerpt from Electoral results for the Division of Charlton § 1990

1990 Australian federal election: Charlton
Party	Candidate	Votes	%	±%
Labor	Bob Brown	36,750	54.4	−3.3
Liberal	Mollie Blake	13,950	20.7	−6.6
Democrats	Lyn Godfrey	9,299	13.8	+2.2
Independent	Geoff Pendlebury	7,510	11.1	+11.1
Total formal votes		67,509	97.6	
Informal votes		1,650	2.4	
Turnout		69,159	96.1	
Two-party-preferred result
Labor	Bob Brown	44,224	65.7	−1.2
Liberal	Mollie Blake	23,115	34.3	+1.2
Labor hold		Swing	−1.2	

=== Chifley ===
This section is an excerpt from Electoral results for the Division of Chifley § 1990

1990 Australian federal election: Chifley
Party	Candidate	Votes	%	±%
Labor	Roger Price	40,085	59.6	−4.7
Liberal	Darren Condon	16,772	25.0	−2.3
Democrats	Nigel Lovell	8,569	12.7	+5.8
Call to Australia	Bill Bird	1,789	2.7	+2.7
Total formal votes		67,215	95.9	
Informal votes		2,894	4.1	
Turnout		70,109	95.2	
Two-party-preferred result
Labor	Roger Price	47,061	70.1	+1.0
Liberal	Darren Condon	20,048	29.9	−1.0
Labor hold		Swing	+1.0	

=== Cook ===
This section is an excerpt from Electoral results for the Division of Cook § 1990

1990 Australian federal election: Cook
Party	Candidate	Votes	%	±%
Liberal	Don Dobie	32,654	50.2	−3.5
Labor	Paul Smith	22,034	33.9	−6.5
Democrats	Terri Richardson	6,368	9.8	+3.9
Independent	Dennis Ralph	2,644	4.1	+4.1
Centre Unity	Patricia Poulos	1,342	2.1	+2.1
Total formal votes		65,042	97.7	
Informal votes		1,549	2.3	
Turnout		66,591	96.2	
Two-party-preferred result
Liberal	Don Dobie	37,142	57.3	+1.2
Labor	Paul Smith	27,721	42.7	−1.2
Liberal hold		Swing	+1.2	

=== Cowper ===
This section is an excerpt from Electoral results for the Division of Cowper § 1990

1990 Australian federal election: Cowper
Party	Candidate	Votes	%	±%
National	Garry Nehl	35,379	47.5	−2.8
Labor	John Murphy	23,219	31.2	−4.1
Democrats	Trevor Pike	7,353	9.9	+3.7
Independent	David Rees	6,640	8.9	+2.4
Cowper Greens	Angelique Meers	1,906	2.6	+2.6
Total formal votes		74,497	98.1	
Informal votes		1,476	1.9	
Turnout		75,973	95.4	
Two-party-preferred result
National	Garry Nehl	42,647	57.3	−1.8
Labor	John Murphy	31,722	42.7	+1.8
National hold		Swing	−1.8	

=== Cunningham ===
This section is an excerpt from Electoral results for the Division of Cunningham § 1990

1990 Australian federal election: Cunningham
Party	Candidate	Votes	%	±%
Labor	Stewart West	27,547	44.4	−14.7
Liberal	Jeff Thomson	13,511	21.8	−7.7
Democrats	Meg Sampson	8,455	13.6	+3.2
Rex Connor Labor	Rex Connor	7,947	12.8	+12.8
|Illawarra Greens	Steve Brigham	4,295	6.9	+6.9
Independent	Peter Symonds	308	0.5	+0.5
Total formal votes		62,063	96.3	
Informal votes		2,371	3.7	
Turnout		64,434	95.8	
Two-party-preferred result
Labor	Stewart West		62.3	−2.1
Liberal	Jeff Thomson		37.7	+2.1
Two-candidate-preferred result
Labor	Stewart West	32,471	52.4	−12.0
Democrats	Meg Sampson	29,473	47.6	+47.6
Labor hold		Swing	N/A	

=== Dobell ===
This section is an excerpt from Electoral results for the Division of Dobell § 1990

1990 Australian federal election: Dobell
Party	Candidate	Votes	%	±%
Labor	Michael Lee	37,063	51.1	−2.0
Liberal	Ian Crook	23,659	32.6	−5.4
Democrats	Rod Benninson	6,317	8.7	−0.2
Grey Power	Neville Malloy	1,948	2.7	+2.7
Independent	Gordon Craig	1,861	2.6	+2.6
Central Coast Greens	Karl Singman	1,657	2.3	+2.3
Total formal votes		72,505	97.6	
Informal votes		1,801	2.4	
Turnout		74,306	95.6	
Two-party-preferred result
Labor	Michael Lee	43,860	60.6	+3.7
Liberal	Ian Crook	28,505	39.4	−3.7
Labor hold		Swing	+3.7	

=== Dundas ===
This section is an excerpt from Electoral results for the Division of Dundas § 1990

1990 Australian federal election: Dundas
Party	Candidate	Votes	%	±%
Liberal	Philip Ruddock	30,887	49.4	−8.0
Labor	Richard Talbot	19,191	30.7	−2.7
Democrats	Peter Reddy	7,447	11.9	+2.7
Call to Australia	Bruce Coleman	1,559	2.5	+2.5
Independent	Alec Preda	1,499	2.4	+2.4
Independent	Barry Liggins	1,376	2.2	+2.2
Independent	John Wilson	513	0.8	+0.8
Total formal votes		62,472	97.4	
Informal votes		1,674	2.6	
Turnout		64,146	95.9	
Two-party-preferred result
Liberal	Philip Ruddock	36,945	59.3	−1.7
Labor	Richard Talbot	25,314	40.7	+1.7
Liberal hold		Swing	−1.7	

=== Eden-Monaro ===
This section is an excerpt from Electoral results for the Division of Eden-Monaro § 1990

1990 Australian federal election: Eden-Monaro
Party	Candidate	Votes	%	±%
Labor	Jim Snow	29,225	41.8	−6.6
Liberal	Rob Pollock	22,290	31.9	+3.1
Independent	Jim Collins	7,259	10.4	+10.4
National	Gaye White	6,615	9.5	−6.9
Democrats	Denise Redmond	4,208	6.0	+6.0
Rex Connor Labor	Greg Doyle	330	0.5	+0.5
Total formal votes		69,927	97.8	
Informal votes		1,548	2.2	
Turnout		71,475	94.7	
Two-party-preferred result
Labor	Jim Snow	37,945	54.3	−0.1
Liberal	Rob Pollock	31,890	45.7	+0.1
Labor hold		Swing	−0.1	

=== Farrer ===
This section is an excerpt from Electoral results for the Division of Farrer § 1990

1990 Australian federal election: Farrer
Party	Candidate	Votes	%	±%
National	Tim Fischer	46,091	67.8	+9.6
Labor	Bill Higgins	21,898	32.2	−0.4
Total formal votes		67,989	97.6	
Informal votes		1,697	2.4	
Turnout		69,686	95.6	
National hold		Swing	+2.6	

=== Fowler ===
This section is an excerpt from Electoral results for the Division of Fowler § 1990

1990 Australian federal election: Fowler
Party	Candidate	Votes	%	±%
Labor	Ted Grace	35,645	56.8	−2.1
Liberal	Gloria Arora	17,424	27.8	−4.9
Democrats	Jon Phillips	4,378	7.0	−1.4
Independent	Rose-Mary Logozzo	3,077	4.9	+4.9
Independent EFF	Pam Branch	1,235	2.0	+2.0
Australian Gruen	Mirjana Ivetic-Elvy	1,026	1.6	+1.6
Total formal votes		62,785	93.2	
Informal votes		4,593	6.8	
Turnout		67,378	94.2	
Two-party-preferred result
Labor	Ted Grace	40,244	64.2	+1.8
Liberal	Gloria Arora	22,417	35.8	−1.8
Labor hold		Swing	+1.8	

=== Gilmore ===
This section is an excerpt from Electoral results for the Division of Gilmore § 1990

1990 Australian federal election: Gilmore
Party	Candidate	Votes	%	±%
National	John Sharp	32,819	48.7	−3.6
Labor	Mick Shea	26,677	39.6	−1.3
Democrats	Susan Nagy	7,935	11.8	+7.2
Total formal votes		67,431	97.5	
Informal votes		1,745	2.5	
Turnout		69,176	95.8	
Two-party-preferred result
National	John Sharp	36,655	54.4	−1.8
Labor	Mick Shea	30,725	45.6	+1.8
National hold		Swing	−1.8	

=== Grayndler ===
This section is an excerpt from Electoral results for the Division of Grayndler § 1990

1990 Australian federal election: Grayndler
Party	Candidate	Votes	%	±%
Labor	Leo McLeay	30,515	52.0	−0.7
Liberal	Diana Bennett	15,932	27.2	−7.7
Democrats	Peter Hennessy	5,447	9.3	+3.2
Independent	Galeb Adra	2,481	4.2	+4.2
Independent	Bruce Welch	1,766	3.0	+3.0
Call to Australia	Clay Wilson	870	1.5	+1.5
Socialist	Habib Fares	686	1.2	+1.2
Independent	Lee Pepper	354	0.6	+0.6
Independent	Paul Urban	353	0.6	+0.6
New Australia	George der Mattosian	270	0.5	+0.5
Total formal votes		58,674	93.0	
Informal votes		4,418	7.0	
Turnout		63,092	93.1	
Two-party-preferred result
Labor	Leo McLeay	36,959	63.3	+3.6
Liberal	Diana Bennett	21,473	36.7	−3.6
Labor hold		Swing	+3.6	

=== Greenway ===
This section is an excerpt from Electoral results for the Division of Greenway § 1990

1990 Australian federal election: Greenway
Party	Candidate	Votes	%	±%
Labor	Russ Gorman	30,891	49.9	−10.0
Liberal	Tony Packard	21,824	35.3	−4.8
Democrats	Roger Posgate	4,866	7.9	+7.9
New Australia	Remi Biala	1,531	2.5	+2.5
Independent EFF	Warren Wormald	1,279	2.1	+2.1
Independent	Ivor F	764	1.2	+1.2
Democratic Socialist	Gail Lord	695	1.1	+1.1
Total formal votes		61,850	95.5	
Informal votes		2,946	4.5	
Turnout		64,796	95.9	
Two-party-preferred result
Labor	Russ Gorman	36,305	58.8	−1.1
Liberal	Tony Packard	25,452	41.2	+1.1
Labor hold		Swing	−1.1	

=== Gwydir ===
This section is an excerpt from Electoral results for the Division of Gwydir § 1990

1990 Australian federal election: Gwydir
Party	Candidate	Votes	%	±%
National	John Anderson	33,449	51.8	−5.4
Labor	Ted Stubbins	21,553	33.4	−3.5
Independent	Bevan O'Regan	5,661	8.8	+8.8
Democrats	Anthony Styles	3,956	6.1	+6.1
Total formal votes		64,619	97.6	
Informal votes		1,581	2.4	
Turnout		66,200	96.1	
Two-party-preferred result
National	John Anderson	39,425	61.2	+0.9
Labor	Ted Stubbins	24,984	38.8	−0.9
National hold		Swing	+0.9	

=== Hughes ===
This section is an excerpt from Electoral results for the Division of Hughes § 1990

1990 Australian federal election: Hughes
Party	Candidate	Votes	%	±%
Labor	Robert Tickner	31,500	45.1	−4.7
Liberal	Cliff Mason	26,503	38.0	−3.6
Democrats	John Clancy	8,576	12.3	+3.8
|Illawarra Greens	George Kriflik	3,254	4.7	+4.7
Total formal votes		69,833	97.9	
Informal votes		1,491	2.1	
Turnout		71,324	96.3	
Two-party-preferred result
Labor	Robert Tickner	39,434	56.6	+1.5
Liberal	Cliff Mason	30,287	43.4	−1.5
Labor hold		Swing	+1.5	

=== Hume ===
This section is an excerpt from Electoral results for the Division of Hume § 1990

1990 Australian federal election: Hume
Party	Candidate	Votes	%	±%
Liberal	Wal Fife	34,229	51.6	−1.1
Labor	George Martin	23,072	34.8	−3.6
Democrats	Glenn Roberts	4,581	6.9	+3.0
Independent	David Jones	3,773	5.7	+5.7
Independent	Doug Kirkwood	633	1.0	+1.0
Total formal votes		66,288	97.9	
Informal votes		1,420	2.1	
Turnout		67,708	95.9	
Two-party-preferred result
Liberal	Wal Fife	38,539	58.2	+0.7
Labor	George Martin	27,639	41.8	−0.7
Liberal hold		Swing	+0.7	

=== Hunter ===
This section is an excerpt from Electoral results for the Division of Hunter § 1990

1990 Australian federal election: Hunter
Party	Candidate	Votes	%	±%
Labor	Eric Fitzgibbon	34,099	49.2	+0.3
Liberal	Ashley Saunders	19,145	27.6	+7.4
Democrats	Chris Richards	8,717	12.6	+6.6
National	Alison Davey	7,312	10.6	−14.2
Total formal votes		69,273	97.9	
Informal votes		1,483	2.1	
Turnout		70,756	96.7	
Two-party-preferred result
Labor	Eric Fitzgibbon	40,403	58.4	+4.9
Liberal	Ashley Saunders	28,724	41.6	−4.9
Labor hold		Swing	+4.9	

=== Kingsford Smith ===
This section is an excerpt from Electoral results for the Division of Kingsford Smith § 1990

1990 Australian federal election: Kingsford-Smith
Party	Candidate	Votes	%	±%
Labor	Laurie Brereton	32,829	52.6	−7.1
Liberal	Carol Dance	17,174	27.5	−5.1
Democrats	Amelia Newman	6,147	9.8	+2.0
South Sydney Greens	Mark Berriman	5,606	9.0	+9.0
Independent	Kaye Tucke	688	1.1	+1.1
Total formal votes		62,444	95.6	
Informal votes		2,860	4.4	
Turnout		65,304	94.9	
Two-party-preferred result
Labor	Laurie Brereton	40,455	65.0	+0.7
Liberal	Carol Dance	21,794	35.0	−0.7
Labor hold		Swing	+0.7	

=== Lindsay ===
This section is an excerpt from Electoral results for the Division of Lindsay § 1990

1990 Australian federal election: Lindsay
Party	Candidate	Votes	%	±%
Labor	Ross Free	31,990	47.9	−4.5
Liberal	Barry Haylock	21,846	32.7	−4.2
Democrats	Paul Moritz	6,038	9.0	+0.6
New Australia	William Gayed	2,638	4.0	+4.0
Call to Australia	Brian Grigg	2,474	3.7	+3.7
Independent	David Thomas	1,743	2.6	+2.6
Total formal votes		66,729	96.8	
Informal votes		2,241	3.2	
Turnout		68,970	96.1	
Two-party-preferred result
Labor	Ross Free	40,004	60.1	+1.1
Liberal	Barry Haylock	26,562	39.9	−1.1
Labor hold		Swing	+1.1	

=== Lowe ===
This section is an excerpt from Electoral results for the Division of Lowe § 1990

1990 Australian federal election: Lowe
Party	Candidate	Votes	%	±%
Liberal	Bob Woods	28,892	45.9	−1.3
Labor	Mary Easson	23,764	37.8	−9.3
Democrats	Andrew Mignot	4,612	7.3	+7.3
Greens in Lowe	Bruce Threlfo	3,193	5.1	+5.1
Independent	Corrado Galimberti	1,652	2.6	+2.6
Call to Australia	Peter Peterson	828	1.3	+1.3
Total formal votes		62,941	96.4	
Informal votes		2,349	3.6	
Turnout		65,290	94.8	
Two-party-preferred result
Liberal	Bob Woods	31,794	50.6	−1.0
Labor	Mary Easson	31,013	49.4	+1.0
Liberal hold		Swing	−1.0	

=== Lyne ===
This section is an excerpt from Electoral results for the Division of Lyne § 1990

1990 Australian federal election: Lyne
Party	Candidate	Votes	%	±%
National	Bruce Cowan	38,963	51.2	−3.8
Labor	Garry Worth	25,414	33.4	−3.2
Democrats	Peter Cooper	11,758	15.4	+7.0
Total formal votes		76,135	97.6	
Informal votes		1,863	2.4	
Turnout		77,998	96.5	
Two-party-preferred result
National	Bruce Cowan	43,570	57.3	−2.5
Labor	Dennis Driver	32,435	42.7	+2.5
National hold		Swing	−2.5	

=== Macarthur ===
This section is an excerpt from Electoral results for the Division of Macarthur § 1990

1990 Australian federal election: Macarthur
Party	Candidate	Votes	%	±%
Labor	Stephen Martin	32,562	49.8	−3.9
Liberal	Jim Cameron	20,460	31.3	−5.3
Democrats	Peter Feltis	8,533	13.1	+3.4
Australian Gruen	Chris Illert	1,751	2.7	+2.7
Call to Australia	Ken McDonald	1,403	2.1	+2.1
Socialist	Leon Bringolf	651	1.0	+1.0
Total formal votes		65,360	97.0	
Informal votes		2,003	3.0	
Turnout		67,363	95.5	
Two-party-preferred result
Labor	Stephen Martin	40,861	62.7	+3.8
Liberal	Jim Cameron	24,352	37.3	−3.8
Labor hold		Swing	+3.8	

=== Mackellar ===
This section is an excerpt from Electoral results for the Division of Mackellar § 1990

1990 Australian federal election: Mackellar
Party	Candidate	Votes	%	±%
Liberal	Jim Carlton	31,773	50.4	−6.5
Labor	Adam Hatcher	15,886	25.2	−5.9
Democrats	Jonathan King	11,595	18.4	+8.4
Independent	Maurice Foley	1,976	3.1	+1.0
Call to Australia	Muriel O'Neill	1,164	1.8	+1.8
Australian Green	Brad Hogarth	648	1.0	+1.0
Total formal votes		63,042	97.2	
Informal votes		1,828	2.8	
Turnout		64,870	94.7	
Two-party-preferred result
Liberal	Jim Carlton	38,358	61.1	−2.1
Labor	Adam Hatcher	24,472	38.9	+2.1
Liberal hold		Swing	−2.1	

=== Macquarie ===
This section is an excerpt from Electoral results for the Division of Macquarie § 1990

1990 Australian federal election: Macquarie
Party	Candidate	Votes	%	±%
Liberal	Alasdair Webster	31,268	47.0	−3.3
Labor	John Marsh	20,932	31.4	−7.3
Democrats	Bruce Forbes	8,500	12.8	+1.8
Independent	John Baker	4,328	6.5	+6.5
Independent	Stuart Douglass	914	1.4	+1.4
Australian Green	Leslie Newton	639	1.0	+0.5
Total formal votes		66,581	97.6	
Informal votes		1,614	2.4	
Turnout		68,195	95.0	
Two-party-preferred result
Liberal	Alasdair Webster	35,631	53.6	−2.2
Labor	John Marsh	30,792	46.4	+2.2
Liberal hold		Swing	−2.2	

=== Mitchell ===
This section is an excerpt from Electoral results for the Division of Mitchell § 1990

1990 Australian federal election: Mitchell
Party	Candidate	Votes	%	±%
Liberal	Alan Cadman	45,050	62.9	−9.6
Labor	Graeme McIlveen	15,704	21.9	−5.5
Democrats	Jan Watts	8,982	12.5	+12.5
Call to Australia	Harold Morton	1,854	2.6	+2.6
Total formal votes		71,590	98.0	
Informal votes		1,427	2.0	
Turnout		73,017	96.0	
Two-party-preferred result
Liberal	Alan Cadman	50,223	70.3	−2.2
Labor	Graeme McIlveen	21,172	29.7	+2.2
Liberal hold		Swing	−2.2	

=== New England ===
This section is an excerpt from Electoral results for the Division of New England § 1990

1990 Australian federal election: New England
Party	Candidate	Votes	%	±%
National	Ian Sinclair	34,292	49.7	−0.4
Labor	Paul Brock	24,082	34.9	−2.6
Democrats	Steve Wood	7,225	10.5	+5.7
Independent	Guy Wernhard	1,993	2.9	+2.9
Independent	Peter Worthing	1,385	2.0	+2.0
Total formal votes		68,977	97.8	
Informal votes		1,562	2.2	
Turnout		70,539	95.8	
Two-party-preferred result
National	Ian Sinclair	38,735	56.3	−2.1
Labor	Paul Brock	30,085	43.7	+2.1
National hold		Swing	−2.1	

=== Newcastle ===
This section is an excerpt from Electoral results for the Division of Newcastle1990

1990 Australian federal election: Newcastle
Party	Candidate	Votes	%	±%
Labor	Allan Morris	33,650	53.7	+2.2
Independent	Leigh Maughan	11,108	17.7	+17.7
Liberal	Mark Hallett		14.8	−1.7
Democrats	Malcolm Martin	7,273	11.6	+6.7
Independent	Frank Blefari	972	1.6	+1.6
Independent	Con Forster	352	0.6	+0.6
Total formal votes		62,624	97.2	
Informal votes		1,792	2.8	
Turnout		64,416	96.2	
Notional two-party-preferred count
Labor	Allan Morris		69.1	+5.0
Liberal	Mark Hallett		30.9	−5.0
Two-candidate-preferred result
Labor	Allan Morris	39,211	62.8	+7.5
Independent	Leigh Maughan	23,198	37.2	+37.2
Labor hold		Swing	+7.5	

=== North Sydney ===
This section is an excerpt from Electoral results for the Division of North Sydney § 1990

1990 Australian federal election: North Sydney
Party	Candidate	Votes	%	±%
Independent	Ted Mack	27,116	44.5	+44.5
Liberal	John Spender	24,582	40.4	−18.1
Labor	Chrissa Loukas	7,240	11.9	−17.6
Democrats	Graeme MacLennan	1,940	3.2	−8.7
Total formal votes		60,878	98.2	
Informal votes		1,111	1.8	
Turnout		61,989	94.6	
Notional two-party-preferred count
Liberal	John Spender		58.4	−5.8
Labor	Chrissa Loukas		41.6	+5.8
Two-candidate-preferred result
Independent	Ted Mack	35,092	57.7	+57.7
Liberal	John Spender	25,772	42.3	−21.9
Independent gain from Liberal		Swing	N/A	

Ted Mack was the first independent elected to the House of Representatives since Sam Benson for Batman in 1966.

=== Page ===
This section is an excerpt from Electoral results for the Division of Page § 1990

1990 Australian federal election: Page
Party	Candidate	Votes	%	±%
National	Ian Robinson	30,431	43.0	−1.2
Labor	Harry Woods	26,841	37.9	+3.9
Democrats	Charles Lowe	6,252	8.8	+1.5
Independent	Martin Frohlich	5,456	7.7	+7.7
Independent	David Kitson	956	1.3	+1.3
Independent	Ivor Brown	885	1.2	+1.2
Total formal votes		70,821	98.2	
Informal votes		1,285	1.8	
Turnout		72,106	95.7	
Two-party-preferred result
Labor	Harry Woods	35,763	50.7	+5.2
National	Ian Robinson	34,807	49.3	−5.2
Labor gain from National		Swing	+5.2	

=== Parkes ===
This section is an excerpt from Electoral results for the Division of Parkes § 1990

1990 Australian federal election: Parkes
Party	Candidate	Votes	%	±%
National	Michael Cobb	35,910	55.5	+5.0
Labor	Ray Leslie	22,599	34.9	−1.7
Democrats	Gloria Collison	6,165	9.5	+5.9
Total formal votes		64,674	97.0	
Informal votes		1,972	3.0	
Turnout		66,646	95.5	
Two-party-preferred result
National	Michael Cobb	39,252	60.7	−0.1
Labor	Ray Leslie	25,399	39.3	+0.1
National hold		Swing	−0.1	

=== Parramatta ===
This section is an excerpt from Electoral results for the Division of Parramatta § 1990

1990 Australian federal election: Parramatta
Party	Candidate	Votes	%	±%
Labor	Paul Elliott	30,575	49.6	−2.9
Liberal	Ross Barwick	22,884	37.2	−1.6
Democrats	Michael Antrum	7,119	11.6	+2.9
Democratic Socialist	Kerry Vernon	1,016	1.6	+1.6
Total formal votes		61,594	96.5	
Informal votes		2,240	3.5	
Turnout		63,834	95.0	
Two-party-preferred result
Labor	Paul Elliott	35,865	58.3	+2.0
Liberal	Ross Barwick	25,603	41.7	−2.0
Labor hold		Swing	+2.0	

=== Phillip ===
This section is an excerpt from Electoral results for the Division of Phillip § 1990

1990 Australian federal election: Phillip
Party	Candidate	Votes	%	±%
Labor	Jeannette McHugh	27,754	43.7	−5.4
Liberal	Charles Copeman	21,589	34.0	−8.8
Democrats	Armon Hicks	6,014	9.5	+2.7
Independent	Cynthia Wrublewski	3,828	6.0	+6.0
Greens	David Barrington	2,857	4.5	+4.5
Call to Australia	Kevin Lohan	570	0.9	+0.9
Independent	Toby Marshall	480	0.8	+0.8
Grey Power	George Vlazny	426	0.7	+0.7
Total formal votes		63,518	96.6	
Informal votes		2,200	3.4	
Turnout		65,718	94.1	
Two-party-preferred result
Labor	Jeannette McHugh	35,819	56.6	+2.5
Liberal	Charles Copeman	27,495	43.4	−2.5
Labor hold		Swing	+2.5	

=== Prospect ===
This section is an excerpt from Electoral results for the Division of Prospect § 1990

1990 Australian federal election: Prospect
Party	Candidate	Votes	%	±%
Labor	Janice Crosio	37,866	56.0	+3.8
Liberal	Paul Newton	20,058	29.7	+1.5
Democrats	Kate Wright	6,639	9.8	+4.8
Australian Gruen	Jenny Zanella	1,455	2.2	+2.2
Democratic Socialist	Dick Nichols	920	1.4	+1.4
Independent	Nick Beams	648	1.0	+1.0
Total formal votes		67,586	94.0	
Informal votes		4,352	6.0	
Turnout		71,938	94.7	
Two-party-preferred result
Labor	Janice Crosio	43,157	64.0	+0.0
Liberal	Paul Newton	24,282	36.0	+0.0
Labor hold		Swing	+0.0	

=== Reid ===
This section is an excerpt from Electoral results for the Division of Reid § 1990

1990 Australian federal election: Reid
Party	Candidate	Votes	%	±%
Labor	Laurie Ferguson	34,591	55.8	−2.6
Liberal	Lynne McDowell	17,016	27.5	−7.1
Democrats	Steven Bailey	3,807	6.1	−0.9
Call to Australia	Keith Barron	2,599	4.2	+4.2
Independent EFF	Vincent White	1,765	2.8	+2.8
Democratic Socialist	Margaret Gleeson	1,328	2.1	+2.1
New Australia	Radwan Elachi	874	1.4	+1.4
Total formal votes		61,980	94.3	
Informal votes		3,775	5.7	
Turnout		65,755	94.6	
Two-party-preferred result
Labor	Laurie Ferguson	40,849	66.1	+4.3
Liberal	Lynne McDowell	20,970	33.9	−4.3
Labor hold		Swing	+4.3	

=== Richmond ===
This section is an excerpt from Electoral results for the Division of Richmond § 1990

1990 Australian federal election: Richmond
Party	Candidate	Votes	%	±%
National	Charles Blunt	28,257	40.9	−10.2
Labor	Neville Newell	18,423	26.7	−8.5
Independent	Helen Caldicott	16,072	23.3	+23.3
Democrats	Stan Gibbs	4,346	6.3	−0.8
Call to Australia	Alan Sims	1,032	1.5	+1.5
Independent	Ian Paterson	445	0.6	+0.6
Independent	Dudley Leggett	279	0.4	+0.4
Independent	Gavin Baillie	187	0.3	+0.3
Total formal votes		69,041	97.8	
Informal votes		1,530	2.2	
Turnout		70,751	95.6	
Two-party-preferred result
Labor	Neville Newell	34,664	50.5	+7.1
National	Charles Blunt	33,980	49.5	−7.1
Labor gain from National		Swing	+7.1	

=== Riverina-Darling ===
This section is an excerpt from Electoral results for the Division of Riverina-Darling § 1990

1990 Australian federal election: Riverina-Darling
Party	Candidate	Votes	%	±%
National	Noel Hicks	31,940	52.9	−0.6
Labor	Peter Black	26,216	43.4	−3.1
Independent	Gordon Dansie	2,181	3.6	+3.6
Total formal votes		60,337	97.1	
Informal votes		1,818	2.9	
Turnout		62,155	94.9	
Two-party-preferred result
National	Noel Hicks	32,892	54.5	+1.0
Labor	Peter Black	27,445	45.5	−1.0
National hold		Swing	+1.0	

=== Robertson ===
This section is an excerpt from Electoral results for the Division of Robertson § 1990

1990 Australian federal election: Robertson
Party	Candidate	Votes	%	±%
Labor	Frank Walker	28,466	39.1	−9.9
Liberal	Paul St Clair	25,753	35.4	−6.3
Democrats	Glenice Griffiths	10,995	15.1	+5.7
Independent EFF	John Anderson	3,390	4.7	+4.7
Central Coast Greens	Bryan Ellis	1,968	2.7	+2.7
Grey Power	Joyce Cook	1,254	1.7	+1.7
Independent	Martin Ritter	614	0.8	+0.8
Independent	Paul Baker	289	0.4	+0.4
Total formal votes		72,729	97.6	
Informal votes		1,806	2.4	
Turnout		74,535	96.2	
Two-party-preferred result
Labor	Frank Walker	38,296	52.8	−1.8
Liberal	Paul St Clair	34,253	47.2	+1.8
Labor hold		Swing	−1.8	

=== Shortland ===
This section is an excerpt from Electoral results for the Division of Shortland § 1990

1990 Australian federal election: Shortland
Party	Candidate	Votes	%	±%
Labor	Peter Morris	35,269	51.4	−3.6
Liberal	Lynne Hall	15,535	22.7	−8.9
Democrats	Michael Reckenberg	7,975	11.6	−1.8
Independent	Lorraine Welsh	5,839	8.5	+8.5
Independent	Mark Booth	2,983	4.4	+4.4
Independent	Geoff Ellis	771	1.1	+1.1
Independent	Clay Robinson	187	0.3	+0.3
Total formal votes		68,559	97.5	
Informal votes		1,724	2.5	
Turnout		70,283	96.5	
Two-party-preferred result
Labor	Peter Morris	43,951	64.3	+3.2
Liberal	Lynne Hall	24,361	35.7	−3.2
Labor hold		Swing	+3.2	

=== St George ===
This section is an excerpt from Electoral results for the Division of St George § 1990

1990 Australian federal election: St George
Party	Candidate	Votes	%	±%
Labor	Stephen Dubois	31,064	49.3	−0.5
Liberal	Alan Smith	23,060	36.6	−6.8
Democrats	John Mukai	6,086	9.7	+4.5
Australian Gruen	Don Collingridge	1,430	2.3	+2.3
Grey Power	Brian Howard	579	0.9	+0.9
New Australia	John Brkich	417	0.7	+0.7
Democratic Socialist	Colin Hesse	392	0.6	+0.6
Total formal votes		63,028	95.1	
Informal votes		3,264	4.9	
Turnout		66,292	96.0	
Two-party-preferred result
Labor	Stephen Dubois	36,309	57.8	+4.1
Liberal	Alan Smith	26,548	42.2	−4.1
Labor hold		Swing	+4.1	

=== Sydney ===
This section is an excerpt from Electoral results for the Division of Sydney § 1990

1990 Australian federal election: Sydney
Party	Candidate	Votes	%	±%
Labor	Peter Baldwin	30,648	50.8	+0.3
Liberal	Stephen Woodhill	13,047	21.6	−3.7
Democrats	Bob Dawson	7,697	12.8	+4.5
Sydney Greens	Steve Brigham	6,745	11.2	+11.2
Independent	Ken Henderson	1,106	1.8	+1.8
Call to Australia	John Davern	757	1.3	+1.3
Independent	Nadar Ponnuswamy	274	0.5	+0.5
Total formal votes		60,274	96.0	
Informal votes		2,539	4.0	
Turnout		62,813	92.2	
Two-party-preferred result
Labor	Peter Baldwin	42,890	71.4	+1.5
Liberal	Stephen Woodhill	17,183	28.6	−1.5
Labor hold		Swing	+1.5	

=== Throsby ===
This section is an excerpt from Electoral results for the Division of Throsby § 1990

1990 Australian federal election: Throsby
Party	Candidate	Votes	%	±%
Labor	Colin Hollis	31,310	47.8	−3.6
Liberal	Garry Noel-Gough	19,706	30.1	+7.8
Democrats	Greg Butler	10,034	15.3	+7.8
Independent	Ronald Henderson	2,298	3.5	+3.5
Australian Gruen	Lyn Allison	1,146	1.7	+1.7
Independent	David Reilly	1,071	1.6	+1.6
Total formal votes		65,565	97.4	
Informal votes		1,763	2.6	
Turnout		67,328	95.9	
Two-party-preferred result
Labor	Colin Hollis	39,418	60.2	+3.1
Liberal	Garry Noel-Gough	26,043	39.8	−3.1
Labor hold		Swing	+3.1	

=== Warringah ===
This section is an excerpt from Electoral results for the Division of Warringah § 1990

1990 Australian federal election: Warringah
Party	Candidate	Votes	%	±%
Liberal	Michael MacKellar	33,831	54.2	−5.5
Labor	David de Montfort	18,168	29.1	−2.1
Democrats	Marcus Weyland	10,412	16.7	+7.6
Total formal votes		62,411	97.4	
Informal votes		1,695	2.6	
Turnout		64,106	94.5	
Two-party-preferred result
Liberal	Michael MacKellar	37,294	59.9	−4.2
Labor	David de Montfort	24,931	40.1	+4.2
Liberal hold		Swing	−4.2	

=== Wentworth ===
This section is an excerpt from Electoral results for the Division of Wentworth § 1990

1990 Australian federal election: Wentworth
Party	Candidate	Votes	%	±%
Liberal	John Hewson	29,653	51.0	−3.6
Labor	Dimitri Tsingris	15,792	27.1	−7.2
Democrats	Estelle Myers	6,603	11.3	+0.2
Greens	Geoff Ash	5,357	9.2	+9.2
Independent	James Reid	779	1.3	+1.3
Total formal votes		58,184	97.9	
Informal votes		1,763	2.9	
Turnout		59,947	92.2	
Two-party-preferred result
Liberal	John Hewson	33,216	57.2	−0.8
Labor	Dimitri Tsingris	24,809	42.8	+0.8
Liberal hold		Swing	−0.8	

=== Werriwa ===
This section is an excerpt from Electoral results for the Division of Werriwa § 1990

1990 Australian federal election: Werriwa
Party	Candidate	Votes	%	±%
Labor	John Kerin	38,392	52.0	−11.7
Liberal	Rick Lewis	22,200	30.0	−6.3
Democrats	Eamon Quinn	7,547	10.2	+10.2
Environment Inds	Sue Dobson	4,866	6.6	+6.6
Australian Gruen	Robert Tomasiello	886	1.2	+1.2
Total formal votes		73,891	96.3	
Informal votes		2,801	3.7	
Turnout		76,692	94.9	
Two-party-preferred result
Labor	John Kerin	47,190	64.0	+0.3
Liberal	Rick Lewis	26,546	36.0	−0.3
Labor hold		Swing	+0.3	

== See also ==
- Results of the 1990 Australian federal election (House of Representatives)
- Members of the Australian House of Representatives, 1990–1993
