= Harry Edwards (politician) =

Australian politician, economist and academic

Dr Harry Edwards AM
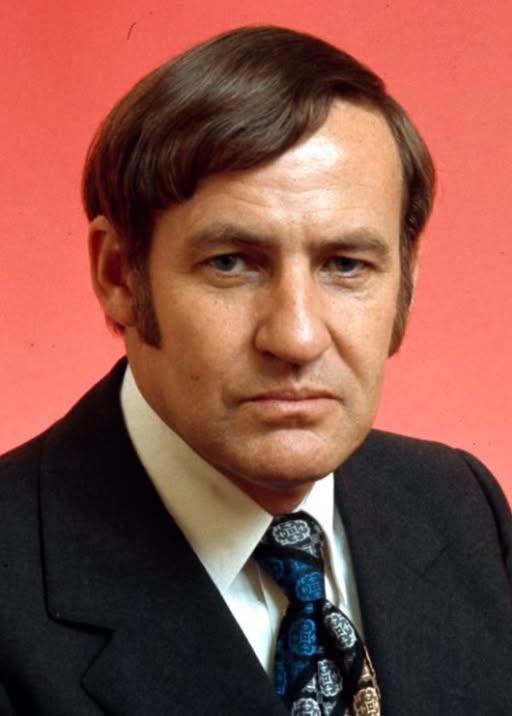

Member of the Australian Parliament for Berowra
- In office 2 December 1972 – 8 February 1993
- Preceded by: Tom Hughes
- Succeeded by: Philip Ruddock

Personal details
- Born: 10 January 1927 Drummoyne, New South Wales, Australia
- Died: 26 June 2012 (aged 85)
- Party: Liberal Party of Australia
- Education: University of Sydney
- Occupation: Economist, university professor

Harold Raymond Edwards AM (10 January 1927 – 26 June 2012) was an Australian politician, economist and academic.

== Early life and education ==
Born in Drummoyne, Sydney, Edwards was educated at Abbotsford Public School until his family moved to Temora, due to the Sydney smog aggravating his sister's asthma. In Temora, Edwards joined the Air Corps and gained his private pilot's licence. When he finished his schooling, he returned to Sydney to attend the University of Sydney, from which he graduated with a Bachelor of Arts, majoring in economics.

== Academic career ==
Edwards received his PhD from Nuffield College, Oxford—his doctoral thesis, Competition and Monopoly in the British Soap Industry, was published as a book in 1962. He was subsequently Professor of Economic Theory at the University of Sydney from 1962 to 1965. In 1966 he became Professor of Economics at Macquarie University, a position he held until 1972. Among his students was John Hewson.

== Political career ==
In 1972, Tom Hughes, the Liberal member for the very safe Australian House of Representatives seat of Berowra was preselected for the seat, but subsequently retired after being removed from the ministry. Edwards nominated for preselection, which he won against a large field of 24 candidates including future Prime Minister John Howard. He was elected at the 1972 federal election, and held the seat until his retirement in 1993. Edwards was the only person to be on the Coalition front bench during the Labor governments of both Gough Whitlam and Bob Hawke, without holding ministerial position during the intervening Liberal government of Malcolm Fraser.

Edwards was made a Member of the Order of Australia in 2005.

Parliament of Australia
Preceded by Tom Hughes	Member for Berowra; 1972–1993	Succeeded by Philip Ruddock
