= Electoral results for the Division of Dundas =

Australian division election results

This is a list of electoral results for the Division of Dundas in Australian federal elections from the division's creation in 1977 until its abolition in 1993.

== Members ==
Member	Party	Term
Philip Ruddock	Liberal	1977—1993

== Election results ==
=== Elections in the 1990s ===
==== 1990 ====
1990 Australian federal election: Dundas
Party	Candidate	Votes	%	±%
Liberal	Philip Ruddock	30,887	49.4	−8.0
Labor	Richard Talbot	19,191	30.7	−2.7
Democrats	Peter Reddy	7,447	11.9	+2.7
Call to Australia	Bruce Coleman	1,559	2.5	+2.5
Independent	Alec Preda	1,499	2.4	+2.4
Independent	Barry Liggins	1,376	2.2	+2.2
Independent	John Wilson	513	0.8	+0.8
Total formal votes		62,472	97.4	
Informal votes		1,674	2.6	
Turnout		64,146	95.9	
Two-party-preferred result
Liberal	Philip Ruddock	36,945	59.3	−1.7
Labor	Richard Talbot	25,314	40.7	+1.7
Liberal hold		Swing	−1.7	

=== Elections in the 1980s ===
==== 1987 ====
1987 Australian federal election: Dundas
Party	Candidate	Votes	%	±%
Liberal	Philip Ruddock	35,747	57.4	+2.2
Labor	Veronica Husted	20,786	33.4	−2.6
Democrats	Robert Springett	5,738	9.2	+0.4
Total formal votes		62,271	96.5	
Informal votes		2,257	3.5	
Turnout		64,528	93.9	
Two-party-preferred result
Liberal	Philip Ruddock	38,010	61.0	+2.1
Labor	Veronica Husted	24,261	39.0	−2.1
Liberal hold		Swing	+2.1	

==== 1984 ====
1984 Australian federal election: Dundas
Party	Candidate	Votes	%	±%
Liberal	Philip Ruddock	33,846	55.2	+0.6
Labor	Margaret Blaxell	22,076	36.0	−3.9
Democrats	John Tuminello	5,400	8.8	+3.3
Total formal votes		61,322	95.3	
Informal votes		3,011	4.7	
Turnout		64,333	94.3	
Two-party-preferred result
Liberal	Philip Ruddock	36,099	58.9	+2.1
Labor	Margaret Blaxell	25,223	41.1	−2.1
Liberal hold		Swing	+2.1	

==== 1983 ====
1983 Australian federal election: Dundas
Party	Candidate	Votes	%	±%
Liberal	Philip Ruddock	33,509	50.1	−3.1
Labor	Margaret Blaxell	29,727	44.4	+6.7
Democrats	John Tumminello	3,712	5.5	−1.8
Total formal votes		66,948	98.3	
Informal votes		1,133	1.7	
Turnout		68,081	95.4	
Two-party-preferred result
Liberal	Philip Ruddock	35,299	52.7	−5.7
Labor	Margaret Blaxell	31,649	47.3	+5.7
Liberal hold		Swing	−5.7	

==== 1980 ====
1980 Australian federal election: Dundas
Party	Candidate	Votes	%	±%
Liberal	Philip Ruddock	35,836	53.2	−0.6
Labor	Margery Hourihan	25,407	37.7	+3.8
Democrats	Stephen Bastian	4,922	7.3	−2.3
Progress	Archibald Brown	1,243	1.8	−0.9
Total formal votes		67,408	97.8	
Informal votes		1,499	2.2	
Turnout		68,907	94.5	
Two-party-preferred result
Liberal	Philip Ruddock		58.4	−1.7
Labor	Margery Hourihan		41.6	+1.7
Liberal hold		Swing	−1.7	

=== Elections in the 1970s ===
==== 1977 ====
1977 Australian federal election: Dundas
Party	Candidate	Votes	%	±%
Liberal	Philip Ruddock	36,427	53.8	−4.4
Labor	Russell Rollason	22,980	33.9	−4.9
Democrats	Brendan Mohide	6,484	9.6	+9.6
Progress	Malcolm McKinnon	1,824	2.7	+2.7
Total formal votes		67,715	98.0	
Informal votes		1,395	2.0	
Turnout		69,110	95.5	
Two-party-preferred result
Liberal	Philip Ruddock		60.1	+0.1
Labor	Russell Rollason		39.9	−0.1
Liberal notional hold		Swing	+0.1	
