= Electoral results for the Division of Page =

Australian division election results

This is a list of electoral results for the Division of Page in Australian federal elections from the electorate's creation in 1984 until the present.

== Members ==
Member	Party	Term
Ian Robinson	National	1984–1990
Harry Woods	Labor	1990–1996
Ian Causley	National	1996–2007
Janelle Saffin	Labor	2007–2013
Kevin Hogan	National	2013–present

== Election results ==
=== Elections in the 2020s ===
==== 2025 ====
2025 Australian federal election: Page
Party	Candidate	Votes	%	±%
Independent	Richard Wells			
Trumpet of Patriots	Donna Lee Pike			
Labor	Wendy Backhous			
National	Kevin Hogan			
Citizens	Jennifer Baker			
Greens	Luke Robinson			
Libertarian	Brenton Williams			
Family First	Andrew Grady			
Independent	Jordan Colless			
One Nation	Peter Nottle			
Shooters, Fishers, Farmers	Josh Pianca			
Total formal votes				
Informal votes				
Turnout				

==== 2022 ====
2022 Australian federal election: Page
Party	Candidate	Votes	%	±%
National	Kevin Hogan	47,701	45.62	−4.01
Labor	Patrick Deegan	19,531	18.68	−7.68
Independent	Hanabeth Luke	13,734	13.13	+13.13
Greens	Kashmir Miller	8,863	8.48	−3.20
One Nation	Donna Pike	5,621	5.38	+5.38
Liberal Democrats	Thomas Searles	3,896	3.73	+3.73
United Australia	Ian Williamson	2,431	2.32	−0.88
Indigenous-Aboriginal	Brett Duroux	1,733	1.66	+1.66
Federation	Heather Smith	816	0.78	+0.78
TNL	Serge Killingbeck	243	0.23	+0.23
Total formal votes		104,569	93.03	−2.22
Informal votes		7,839	6.97	+2.22
Turnout		112,408	91.47	−1.06
Two-party-preferred result
National	Kevin Hogan	63,512	60.74	+1.29
Labor	Patrick Deegan	41,057	39.26	−1.29
National hold		Swing	+1.29	

Alluvial diagram for preference flows in the seat of Page in the 2022 federal election. indicates at what stage the winning candidate had over 50% of the votes and was declared the winner.

=== Elections in the 2010s ===
==== 2019 ====
2019 Australian federal election: Page
Party	Candidate	Votes	%	±%
National	Kevin Hogan	53,672	49.63	+5.35
Labor	Patrick Deegan	28,507	26.36	−8.50
Greens	Dan Reid	12,634	11.68	+0.54
Independent	Fiona Leviny	5,240	4.85	+4.85
United Australia	John Mudge	3,460	3.20	+3.20
Animal Justice	Alison Waters	2,646	2.45	−0.40
Christian Democrats	Peter Walker	1,992	1.84	−1.01
Total formal votes		108,151	95.25	−0.91
Informal votes		5,397	4.75	+0.91
Turnout		113,548	92.53	−0.25
Two-party-preferred result
National	Kevin Hogan	64,295	59.45	+7.15
Labor	Patrick Deegan	43,856	40.55	−7.15
National hold		Swing	+7.15	

==== 2016 ====
2016 Australian federal election: Page
Party	Candidate	Votes	%	±%
National	Kevin Hogan	46,327	44.28	−2.15
Labor	Janelle Saffin	36,471	34.86	−1.03
Greens	Kudra Falla-Ricketts	11,649	11.14	+2.09
Liberal Democrats	Mark Ellis	4,199	4.01	+4.01
Animal Justice	Anna Ludvik	2,984	2.85	+2.85
Christian Democrats	Bethany McAlpine	2,982	2.85	+0.98
Total formal votes		104,612	96.16	+1.02
Informal votes		4,181	3.84	−1.02
Turnout		108,793	92.78	−1.21
Two-party-preferred result
National	Kevin Hogan	54,717	52.30	−0.80
Labor	Janelle Saffin	49,895	47.70	+0.80
National hold		Swing	−0.80	

==== 2013 ====
2013 Australian federal election: Page
Party	Candidate	Votes	%	±%
National	Kevin Hogan	40,088	46.65	+4.18
Labor	Janelle Saffin	33,336	38.79	−6.94
Greens	Desley Banks	5,601	6.52	−2.06
Palmer United	Stephen Janes	4,135	4.81	+4.81
Christian Democrats	Carol Ordish	1,394	1.62	+1.62
One Nation	Rod Smith	1,381	1.61	+1.61
Total formal votes		85,935	95.32	−0.29
Informal votes		4,223	4.68	+0.29
Turnout		90,158	94.20	−0.46
Two-party-preferred result
National	Kevin Hogan	45,134	52.52	+6.71
Labor	Janelle Saffin	40,801	47.48	−6.71
National gain from Labor		Swing	+6.71	

==== 2010 ====
2010 Australian federal election: Page
Party	Candidate	Votes	%	±%
Labor	Janelle Saffin	39,043	45.73	+4.05
National	Kevin Hogan	36,263	42.47	−0.58
Greens	Jeff Johnson	7,325	8.58	+0.47
Independent	Doug Behn	1,259	1.47	−0.31
Independent	Merle Summerville	896	1.05	+1.05
Democrats	Julia Melland	598	0.70	−0.36
Total formal votes		85,384	95.61	−0.09
Informal votes		3,918	4.39	+0.09
Turnout		89,302	94.64	−1.45
Two-party-preferred result
Labor	Janelle Saffin	46,273	54.19	+1.83
National	Kevin Hogan	39,111	45.81	−1.83
Labor hold		Swing	+1.83	

=== Elections in the 2000s ===
==== 2007 ====
2007 Australian federal election: Page
Party	Candidate	Votes	%	±%
National	Chris Gulaptis	36,813	43.05	−6.68
Labor	Janelle Saffin	35,636	41.67	+8.60
Greens	Theo Jongen	6,930	8.10	−1.46
Independent	Doug Behn	1,525	1.78	+0.40
Christian Democrats	Rhonda Avasalu	1,430	1.67	+1.67
Democrats	Julia Melland	910	1.06	+0.79
Independent	Tony Kane	877	1.03	+1.03
Family First	Mirian Vega	784	0.92	+0.76
Liberty & Democracy	Ben Beatty	462	0.54	+0.54
Citizens Electoral Council	John Culverwell	143	0.17	−0.78
Total formal votes		85,510	95.70	−0.22
Informal votes		3,842	4.30	+0.22
Turnout		89,352	95.64	−0.29
Two-party-preferred result
Labor	Janelle Saffin	44,770	52.36	+7.83
National	Chris Gulaptis	40,740	47.64	−7.83
Labor gain from National		Swing	+7.83	

==== 2004 ====
2004 Australian federal election: Page
Party	Candidate	Votes	%	±%
National	Ian Causley	37,637	48.48	+6.63
Labor	Kevin Bell	25,702	33.11	+4.11
Greens	Mark Jackson	8,399	10.82	+3.62
Liberals for Forests	Belinda Anderson	2,155	2.78	+2.78
Outdoor Recreation	Chris Mateer	1,225	1.58	+1.58
	Doug Behn	1,216	1.57	+0.72
Citizens Electoral Council	Angela Griffiths	839	1.08	+0.93
Socialist Alliance	Tom Flanagan	460	0.59	+0.59
Total formal votes		77,633	95.77	+1.09
Informal votes		3,427	4.23	−1.09
Turnout		81,060	95.34	−0.37
Two-party-preferred result
National	Ian Causley	42,099	54.23	+1.46
Labor	Kevin Bell	35,534	45.77	−1.46
National hold		Swing	+1.46	

==== 2001 ====
2001 Australian federal election: Page
Party	Candidate	Votes	%	±%
National	Ian Causley	31,204	41.85	−0.46
Labor	Terry Flanagan	21,618	29.00	−6.38
Independent	Tom Cooper	5,482	7.35	+7.35
Greens	John Corkill	5,365	7.20	+2.53
One Nation	Marie Mathew	4,039	5.42	−5.32
Democrats	Allan Jeffreys	2,012	2.70	−0.17
Christian Democrats	Arthur James Felsch	1,344	1.80	+0.54
HEMP	Judy Canales	1,274	1.71	+1.71
Independent	Kathryn Pollard-O'Hara	1,240	1.66	+1.66
Independent	Doug Behn	636	0.85	−0.95
	Edda Lampis	231	0.31	+0.31
Citizens Electoral Council	Angela Griffiths	110	0.15	+0.15
Total formal votes		74,555	94.68	−2.73
Informal votes		4,189	5.32	+2.73
Turnout		78,744	96.36	
Two-party-preferred result
National	Ian Causley	39,342	52.77	−0.59
Labor	Terry Flanagan	35,213	47.23	+0.59
National hold		Swing	−0.59	

=== Elections in the 1990s ===
==== 1998 ====
1998 Australian federal election: Page
Party	Candidate	Votes	%	±%
National	Ian Causley	31,313	41.76	+5.09
Labor	Joy Mathews	26,548	35.40	−2.63
One Nation	Warren Wenban	8,473	11.30	+11.30
Greens	Nicole Rogers	3,460	4.61	+0.71
Democrats	Peter Wrightson	2,162	2.88	−0.42
Independent	Doug Behn	1,498	2.00	+2.00
Christian Democrats	Graham Clausen	1,133	1.51	+0.04
Democratic Socialist	Kath O'Driscoll	402	0.54	+0.54
Total formal votes		74,989	97.35	−0.70
Informal votes		2,043	2.65	+0.70
Turnout		77,032	95.99	−0.59
Two-party-preferred result
National	Ian Causley	39,265	52.36	−1.95
Labor	Joy Mathews	35,724	47.64	+1.95
National hold		Swing	−1.95	

==== 1996 ====
1996 Australian federal election: Page
Party	Candidate	Votes	%	±%
Labor	Harry Woods	28,972	38.04	−3.79
National	Ian Causley	27,927	36.66	+7.84
Liberal	Anne Hunter	12,132	15.93	−1.38
Greens	Sue Higginson	2,971	3.90	+3.90
Democrats	James Page	2,514	3.30	+1.96
Call to Australia	Trevor Arthur	1,119	1.47	+1.47
Greens	Al Oshlack	535	0.70	−1.70
Total formal votes		76,170	98.05	+0.11
Informal votes		1,513	1.95	−0.11
Turnout		77,683	96.59	+0.31
Two-party-preferred result
National	Ian Causley	41,190	54.31	+4.44
Labor	Harry Woods	34,657	45.69	−4.44
National gain from Labor		Swing	+4.44	

==== 1993 ====
1993 Australian federal election: Page
Party	Candidate	Votes	%	±%
Labor	Harry Woods	30,772	41.83	+8.04
National	Mike Emerson	21,206	28.83	−13.14
Liberal	Malcolm Marshall	12,732	17.31	+17.31
Independent	Ros Irwin	2,890	3.93	+3.93
Independent	Rhondda O'Neill	2,446	3.32	+3.32
Richmond/Clarence Greens	Elle Fikke	1,766	2.40	+2.40
Democrats	Deborah Inglis	985	1.34	−6.07
Confederate Action	Lindsay Olen	377	0.51	+0.51
Independent	Graeme Lean	259	0.35	+0.35
Natural Law	Antoinette Perry	134	0.18	+0.18
Total formal votes		73,567	97.94	−0.25
Informal votes		1,545	2.06	+0.25
Turnout		75,112	96.27	
Two-party-preferred result
Labor	Harry Woods	36,809	50.13	−0.66
National	Mike Emerson	36,616	49.87	+0.66
Labor hold		Swing	−0.66	

==== 1990 ====
1990 Australian federal election: Page
Party	Candidate	Votes	%	±%
National	Ian Robinson	30,431	43.0	−1.2
Labor	Harry Woods	26,841	37.9	+3.9
Democrats	Charles Lowe	6,252	8.8	+1.5
Independent	Martin Frohlich	5,456	7.7	+7.7
Independent	David Kitson	956	1.3	+1.3
Independent	Ivor Brown	885	1.2	+1.2
Total formal votes		70,821	98.2	
Informal votes		1,285	1.8	
Turnout		72,106	95.7	
Two-party-preferred result
Labor	Harry Woods	35,763	50.7	+5.2
National	Ian Robinson	34,807	49.3	−5.2
Labor gain from National		Swing	+5.2	

=== Elections in the 1980s ===
==== 1987 ====
1987 Australian federal election: Page
Party	Candidate	Votes	%	±%
National	Ian Robinson	27,756	44.2	−3.3
Labor	Trevor Ellem	21,357	34.0	−7.1
Independent	William Egerton	9,149	14.6	+14.6
Democrats	Ivor Brown	4,586	7.3	+2.4
Total formal votes		62,848	97.5	
Informal votes		1,580	2.5	
Turnout		64,428	93.4	
Two-party-preferred result
National	Ian Robinson	34,249	54.5	−0.6
Labor	Trevor Ellem	28,580	45.5	+0.6
National hold		Swing	−0.6	

==== 1984 ====
1984 Australian federal election: Page
Party	Candidate	Votes	%	±%
National	Ian Robinson	27,883	47.5	−4.0
Labor	Brian Morris	24,144	41.1	+0.0
Independent	Brian Stone	3,800	6.5	+6.5
Democrats	Anne Brown	2,875	4.9	−2.3
Total formal votes		58,702	96.5	
Informal votes		2,096	3.5	
Turnout		60,798	94.6	
Two-party-preferred result
National	Ian Robinson	32,341	55.1	+0.4
Labor	Brian Morris	26,356	44.9	−0.4
National notional hold		Swing	+0.4	
