= Electoral results for the Division of Riverina-Darling =

Australian division election results

This is a list of electoral results for the Division of Riverina-Darling in Australian federal elections from the division's creation in 1984 until its abolition in 1993.

== Members ==
Member	Party	Term
Noel Hicks	National	1984–1993

== Election results ==
=== Elections in the 1990s ===
==== 1990 ====
1990 Australian federal election: Riverina-Darling
Party	Candidate	Votes	%	±%
National	Noel Hicks	31,940	52.9	−0.6
Labor	Peter Black	26,216	43.4	−3.1
Independent	Gordon Dansie	2,181	3.6	+3.6
Total formal votes		60,337	97.1	
Informal votes		1,818	2.9	
Turnout		62,155	94.9	
Two-party-preferred result
National	Noel Hicks	32,892	54.5	+1.0
Labor	Peter Black	27,445	45.5	−1.0
National hold		Swing	+1.0	

=== Elections in the 1980s ===
==== 1987 ====
1987 Australian federal election: Riverina-Darling
Party	Candidate	Votes	%	±%
National	Noel Hicks	32,238	53.5	+6.1
Labor	Peter Black	28,017	46.5	+2.5
Total formal votes		60,255	96.8	
Informal votes		2,002	3.2	
Turnout		62,257	94.7	
National hold		Swing	−1.1	

==== 1984 ====
1984 Australian federal election: Riverina-Darling
Party	Candidate	Votes	%	±%
National	Noel Hicks	28,316	47.4	+0.0
Labor	Ron Adams	26,304	44.0	−5.9
Liberal	John Sullivan	3,936	6.6	+6.5
Democrats	Peter Hains	969	1.6	−1.0
Independent	Frederick Martin	276	0.5	+0.5
Total formal votes		59,801	94.9	
Informal votes		3,228	5.1	
Turnout		63,029	93.6	
Two-party-preferred result
National	Noel Hicks	32,642	54.6	+5.9
Labor	Ron Adams	27,146	45.4	−5.9
National notional gain from Labor		Swing	+5.9	
