= Electoral results for the Division of Richmond =

Australian division election results

This is a list of electoral results for the Division of Richmond in Australian federal elections from the electorate's creation in 1901 until the present.

== Members ==
Member	Party	Term
(Sir) Thomas Ewing	Protectionist	1901–1909
(Sir) Thomas Ewing	Liberal	1909–1910
Walter Massy-Greene	Liberal	1910–1916
Walter Massy-Greene	Nationalist	1916–1922
Roland Green	Country	1922–1937
Larry Anthony, senior	Country	1937–1957
Doug Anthony	Country, National	1957–1984
Charles Blunt	National	1984–1990
Neville Newell	Labor	1990–1996
Larry Anthony	National	1996–2004
Justine Elliot	Labor	2004–present

== Election results ==
=== Elections in the 2020s ===
==== 2025 ====
2025 Australian federal election: Richmond
Party	Candidate	Votes	%	±%
Labor	Justine Elliot	31,901	30.40	+1.60
Greens	Mandy Nolan	27,783	26.47	+1.20
National	Kimberly Hone	25,795	24.58	+1.23
One Nation	Ian Mye	5,709	5.44	+1.36
Legalise Cannabis	Vivian Mac McMahon	3,998	3.81	+3.81
People First	Richard Curtin	3,364	3.21	+3.21
Trumpet of Patriots	Phillip Peterkin	2,052	1.96	+1.96
Independent	Kevin Loughrey	1,754	1.67	+1.67
Libertarian	Ian Cherry Willis	1,619	1.54	−6.16
Independent	James Ian McKenzie	977	0.93	+0.93
Total formal votes		104,952	92.43	−0.65
Informal votes		8,600	7.57	+0.65
Turnout		113,552	89.54	+3.24
Two-party-preferred result
Labor	Justine Elliot	62,975	60.00	+1.77
National	Kimberly Hone	41,977	40.00	−1.77
Labor hold		Swing	+1.77	

==== 2022 ====
2022 Australian federal election: Richmond
Party	Candidate	Votes	%	±%
Labor	Justine Elliot	28,733	28.80	−2.91
Greens	Mandy Nolan	25,216	25.27	+4.95
National	Kimberly Hone	23,299	23.35	−13.51
Liberal Democrats	Gary Biggs	7,681	7.70	+7.70
One Nation	Tracey Bell-Henselin	4,073	4.08	+4.08
United Australia	Robert Marks	2,922	2.93	−0.97
Independent	David Warth	2,341	2.35	+2.35
Informed Medical Options	Monica Shepherd	2,271	2.28	+1.10
Independent	Nathan Jones	1,974	1.98	+1.98
Independent	Terry Sharples	1,274	1.28	+1.28
Total formal votes		99,784	93.08	+0.52
Informal votes		7,424	6.92	−0.52
Turnout		107,208	90.37	−0.45
Two-party-preferred result
Labor	Justine Elliot	58,104	58.23	+4.15
National	Kimberly Hone	41,680	41.77	−4.15
Labor hold		Swing	+4.15	

Alluvial diagram for preference flows in the seat of Richmond in the 2022 federal election. indicates at what stage the winning candidate had over 50% of the votes and was declared the winner.

=== Elections in the 2010s ===
==== 2019 ====
2019 Australian federal election: Richmond
Party	Candidate	Votes	%	±%
National	Matthew Fraser	36,979	36.86	−0.75
Labor	Justine Elliot	31,807	31.71	+0.66
Greens	Michael Lyon	20,384	20.32	−0.12
United Australia	Hamish Mitchell	3,913	3.90	+3.90
Sustainable Australia	Ronald McDonald	3,154	3.14	+3.14
Independent	Ray Karam	1,566	1.56	+1.56
Christian Democrats	Morgan Cox	1,338	1.33	−0.18
Involuntary Medication Objectors	Tom Barnett	1,179	1.18	+1.18
Total formal votes		100,320	92.56	−3.77
Informal votes		8,061	7.44	+3.77
Turnout		108,381	90.82	+0.20
Two-party-preferred result
Labor	Justine Elliot	54,251	54.08	+0.12
National	Matthew Fraser	46,069	45.92	−0.12
Labor hold		Swing	+0.12	

==== 2016 ====
2016 Australian federal election: Richmond
Party	Candidate	Votes	%	±%
National	Matthew Fraser	37,006	37.61	−1.80
Labor	Justine Elliot	30,551	31.05	−3.33
Greens	Dawn Walker	20,108	20.44	+5.07
One Nation	Neil Smith	6,160	6.26	+6.11
Animal Justice	Angela Pollard	3,089	3.14	+3.14
Christian Democrats	Russell Kilarney	1,484	1.51	+0.10
Total formal votes		98,398	96.33	+1.25
Informal votes		3,748	3.67	−1.25
Turnout		102,146	90.54	−0.80
Two-party-preferred result
Labor	Justine Elliot	53,092	53.96	+2.38
National	Matthew Fraser	45,306	46.04	−2.38
Labor hold		Swing	+2.38	

==== 2013 ====
2013 Australian federal election: Richmond
Party	Candidate	Votes	%	±%
National	Matthew Fraser	32,066	37.60	+16.39
Labor	Justine Elliot	28,575	33.51	−5.68
Greens	Dawn Walker	15,083	17.69	+1.54
Palmer United	Charles Allen	6,359	7.46	+7.46
Independent	Kev Skinner	1,971	2.31	+2.31
Christian Democrats	John Ordish	1,224	1.44	+1.44
Total formal votes		85,278	95.09	+0.64
Informal votes		4,403	4.91	−0.64
Turnout		89,681	92.09	−0.55
Two-party-preferred result
Labor	Justine Elliot	45,179	52.98	−4.01
National	Matthew Fraser	40,099	47.02	+4.01
Labor hold		Swing	−4.01	

==== 2010 ====
2010 Australian federal election: Richmond
Party	Candidate	Votes	%	±%
Labor	Justine Elliot	31,679	39.19	−4.62
National	Alan Hunter	17,146	21.21	−15.77
Liberal	Joan van Lieshout	15,424	19.08	+19.08
Greens	Joe Ebono	13,056	16.15	+1.22
Independent	Julie Boyd	940	1.16	+1.16
Independent	Matthew Hartley	805	1.00	+1.00
Independent	Stephen Hegedus	747	0.92	+0.92
Independent	Nic Faulkner	536	0.66	+0.66
Democrats	David Robinson	502	0.62	+0.62
Total formal votes		80,835	94.45	−1.27
Informal votes		4,752	5.55	+1.27
Turnout		85,587	92.64	−1.85
Two-party-preferred result
Labor	Justine Elliot	46,071	56.99	−1.88
National	Alan Hunter	34,764	43.01	+1.88
Labor hold		Swing	−1.88	

=== Elections in the 2000s ===
==== 2007 ====
2007 Australian federal election: Richmond
Party	Candidate	Votes	%	±%
Labor	Justine Elliot	35,699	43.81	+8.15
National	Sue Page	30,134	36.98	−7.53
Greens	Giovanni Ebono	12,168	14.93	+1.32
Liberty & Democracy	Daniel Farmilo	1,320	1.62	+1.62
Christian Democrats	Barbara Raymond	1,039	1.28	+1.28
Democrats	Scott Sledge	950	1.17	+0.12
Citizens Electoral Council	Graham McCallum	176	0.22	+0.16
Total formal votes		81,486	95.72	−0.62
Informal votes		3,647	4.28	+0.62
Turnout		85,133	94.57	+0.24
Two-party-preferred result
Labor	Justine Elliot	47,973	58.87	+7.43
National	Sue Page	33,513	41.13	−7.43
Labor hold		Swing	+7.43	

==== 2004 ====
2004 Australian federal election: Richmond
Party	Candidate	Votes	%	±%
National	Larry Anthony	36,095	45.79	+1.04
Labor	Justine Elliot	28,059	35.60	+1.60
Greens	Susanna Flower	9,751	12.37	+2.31
Family First	Craig Lees	1,626	2.06	+2.06
Liberals for Forests	Fiona Tyler	1,417	1.80	+1.80
Democrats	Timothy Winton-Brown	913	1.16	−1.71
Veterans	Allan Watt	617	0.78	+0.78
Nuclear Disarmament	Dean Jefferys	341	0.43	+0.43
Total formal votes		78,819	96.39	+1.74
Informal votes		2,951	3.61	−1.74
Turnout		81,770	94.68	+0.28
Two-party-preferred result
Labor	Justine Elliot	39,560	50.19	+1.87
National	Larry Anthony	39,259	49.81	−1.87
Labor gain from National		Swing	+1.74	

==== 2001 ====
2001 Australian federal election: Richmond
Party	Candidate	Votes	%	±%
National	Larry Anthony	32,516	44.76	+5.50
Labor	Jenny McAllister	24,702	34.00	−4.65
Greens	Jan Barham	7,310	10.06	+4.36
One Nation	Dell Rolfe	3,016	4.15	−6.09
Democrats	Casey Balk	2,085	2.87	−0.03
Independent	Julie Nathan	942	1.30	+1.30
HEMP	Dean Jefferys	919	1.26	+1.26
One Nation	John Penhaligon	668	0.92	+0.92
Independent	Rob Simpson	249	0.34	+0.34
Independent	Nicolas Faulkner	161	0.22	+0.22
Non-Custodial Parents	Alexander Peniazev	85	0.12	+0.12
Total formal votes		72,653	94.65	−2.65
Informal votes		4,106	5.35	+2.65
Turnout		76,759	95.00	
Two-party-preferred result
National	Larry Anthony	37,545	51.68	+0.85
Labor	Jenny McAllister	35,108	48.32	−0.85
National hold		Swing	+0.85	

=== Elections in the 1990s ===
==== 1998 ====
1998 Australian federal election: Richmond
Party	Candidate	Votes	%	±%
National	Larry Anthony	32,645	40.16	+4.73
Labor	Neville Newell	31,129	38.30	+3.66
One Nation	John Penhaligon	8,278	10.18	+10.18
Greens	Tom Tabart	4,323	5.32	+0.06
Democrats	Peter Cullen	2,305	2.84	−2.58
Independent	Alan DeVendra	1,662	2.04	+2.04
Independent	Leo Piek	621	0.76	+0.76
Natural Law	Helen Patterson	320	0.39	+0.39
Total formal votes		81,283	97.28	−0.63
Informal votes		2,271	2.72	+0.63
Turnout		83,554	94.95	−1.06
Two-party-preferred result
National	Larry Anthony	41,270	50.77	−5.98
Labor	Neville Newell	40,013	49.23	+5.98
National hold		Swing	−5.98	

==== 1996 ====
1996 Australian federal election: Richmond
Party	Candidate	Votes	%	±%
National	Larry Anthony	27,262	35.43	+9.70
Labor	Neville Newell	26,653	34.64	−9.57
Liberal	Keith Johnson	14,180	18.43	−2.68
Democrats	Mindy Thorpe	4,171	5.42	+3.19
Greens	Annette Coyle	4,043	5.25	+0.65
Greens	Robert Corowa	638	0.83	+0.83
Total formal votes		76,947	97.91	+0.98
Informal votes		1,640	2.09	−0.98
Turnout		78,587	96.01	+0.37
Two-party-preferred result
National	Larry Anthony	43,448	56.75	+8.53
Labor	Neville Newell	33,108	43.25	−8.53
National gain from Labor		Swing	+8.53	

==== 1993 ====
1993 Australian federal election: Richmond
Party	Candidate	Votes	%	±%
Labor	Neville Newell	30,418	44.21	+13.80
National	Larry Anthony	17,700	25.73	−16.07
Liberal	Bruce Francis	14,521	21.11	+21.11
Greens	Josephine Faith	3,167	4.60	+4.60
Democrats	Eddy Kemp	1,536	2.23	−5.10
Independent	Hugh Ermacora	812	1.18	+1.18
Confederate Action	Fred Crooks	261	0.38	+0.38
Independent	Christopher McIlrath	230	0.33	+0.33
Natural Law	Moira Grayndler	155	0.23	+0.23
Total formal votes		68,800	96.93	−0.90
Informal votes		2,176	3.07	+0.90
Turnout		70,976	95.64	
Two-party-preferred result
Labor	Neville Newell	35,598	51.77	+1.26
National	Larry Anthony	33,160	48.23	−1.26
Labor hold		Swing	+1.26	

==== 1990 ====
1990 Australian federal election: Richmond
Party	Candidate	Votes	%	±%
National	Charles Blunt	28,257	40.9	−10.2
Labor	Neville Newell	18,423	26.7	−8.5
Independent	Helen Caldicott	16,072	23.3	+23.3
Democrats	Stan Gibbs	4,346	6.3	−0.8
Call to Australia	Alan Sims	1,032	1.5	+1.5
Independent	Ian Paterson	445	0.6	+0.6
Independent	Dudley Leggett	279	0.4	+0.4
Independent	Gavin Baillie	187	0.3	+0.3
Total formal votes		69,041	97.8	
Informal votes		1,530	2.2	
Turnout		70,751	95.6	
Two-party-preferred result
Labor	Neville Newell	34,664	50.5	+7.1
National	Charles Blunt	33,980	49.5	−7.1
Labor gain from National		Swing	+7.1	

=== Elections in the 1980s ===
==== 1987 ====
1987 Australian federal election: Richmond
Party	Candidate	Votes	%	±%
National	Charles Blunt	31,164	51.1	−1.5
Labor	Klaas Woldring	21,509	35.2	−1.6
Democrats	Anne Brown	4,308	7.1	+2.1
Independent	Mac Nicolson	4,061	6.7	+6.7
Total formal votes		61,042	97.5	
Informal votes		1,578	2.5	
Turnout		62,620	93.2	
Two-party-preferred result
National	Charles Blunt	34,542	56.6	−0.6
Labor	Klaas Woldring	26,500	43.4	+0.6
National hold		Swing	−0.6	

==== 1984 ====
1984 Australian federal election: Richmond
Party	Candidate	Votes	%	±%
National	Charles Blunt	29,364	52.6	+0.1
Labor	Klaas Woldring	20,565	36.8	−3.4
Democrats	Ivor Brown	2,814	5.0	−2.3
Independent	Jim Saunders	2,238	4.0	+4.0
Independent	Jon Axens	866	1.6	+1.6
Total formal votes		55,847	96.4	
Informal votes		2,083	3.6	
Turnout		57,930	94.8	
Two-party-preferred result
National	Charles Blunt	31,917	57.2	+1.8
Labor	Klaas Woldring	23,930	42.8	−1.8
National hold		Swing	+1.8	

==== 1984 by-election ====
Richmond by-election, 1984
Party	Candidate	Votes	%	±%
Labor	Peter Carmont	28,914	36.2	−3.5
National	Charles Blunt	26,972	33.8	−19.2
Liberal	Brian Pezzutti	16,948	21.2	+21.2
Independent	Fast Bucks	3,657	4.6	+4.6
Democrats	Simon Clough	2,587	3.2	−4.1
Independent	Denis Griffin	469	0.6	+0.6
Uninflated Movement	Nadar Ponnuswamy	290	0.4	+0.4
Total formal votes		79,837	98.3	
Informal votes		1,383	1.7	
Turnout		81,220	89.8	
Two-party-preferred result
National	Charles Blunt	44,528	55.8	−0.1
Labor	Peter Carmont	35,309	44.2	+0.1
National hold		Swing	−0.1	

==== 1983 ====
1983 Australian federal election: Richmond
Party	Candidate	Votes	%	±%
National	Doug Anthony	42,684	53.0	−3.9
Labor	Terence McGee	31,967	39.7	+3.7
Democrats	Kenneth Nicholson	5,906	7.3	+0.2
Total formal votes		80,557	98.9	
Informal votes		922	1.1	
Turnout		81,479	95.3	
Two-party-preferred result
National	Doug Anthony		55.9	−4.4
Labor	Terence McGee		44.1	+4.4
National hold		Swing	−4.4	

==== 1980 ====
1980 Australian federal election: Richmond
Party	Candidate	Votes	%	±%
National Country	Doug Anthony	42,037	56.9	−4.5
Labor	Terence McGee	26,574	36.0	+4.2
Democrats	Ashley Albanese	5,216	7.1	+1.7
Total formal votes		73,827	98.8	
Informal votes		906	1.2	
Turnout		74,733	94.6	
Two-party-preferred result
National Country	Doug Anthony		60.3	−4.5
Labor	Terence McGee		39.7	+4.5
National Country hold		Swing	−4.5	

=== Elections in the 1970s ===
==== 1977 ====
1977 Australian federal election: Richmond
Party	Candidate	Votes	%	±%
National Country	Doug Anthony	40,869	61.4	+0.1
Labor	John Maxwell	21,170	31.8	−2.8
Democrats	Bernard Walrut	3,611	5.4	+5.4
Independent	Josephine Mallett	941	1.4	+1.4
Total formal votes		66,591	98.9	
Informal votes		754	1.1	
Turnout		67,345	95.8	
Two-party-preferred result
National Country	Doug Anthony		64.8	+1.2
Labor	John Maxwell		35.2	−1.2
National Country hold		Swing	+1.2	

==== 1975 ====
1975 Australian federal election: Richmond
Party	Candidate	Votes	%	±%
National Country	Doug Anthony	37,899	64.1	+1.9
Labor	Archibald Johnston	18,766	31.8	−2.3
Australia	Bernard Walrut	1,233	2.1	−1.6
Independent	Ethel Adams	1,188	2.0	+2.0
Total formal votes		59,086	98.9	
Informal votes		663	1.1	
Turnout		59,749	95.6	
Two-party-preferred result
National Country	Doug Anthony		66.4	+2.7
Labor	Archibald Johnston		33.6	−2.7
National Country hold		Swing	+2.7	

==== 1974 ====
1974 Australian federal election: Richmond
Party	Candidate	Votes	%	±%
Country	Doug Anthony	35,090	62.2	+4.7
Labor	Frederick Braid	19,216	34.1	+1.7
Australia	Bernard Walrut	2,090	3.7	−6.5
Total formal votes		56,396	99.0	
Informal votes		589	1.0	
Turnout		56,985	95.9	
Two-party-preferred result
Country	Doug Anthony		63.7	+1.5
Labor	Frederick Braid		36.3	−1.5
Country hold		Swing	+1.5	

==== 1972 ====
1972 Australian federal election: Richmond
Party	Candidate	Votes	%	±%
Country	Doug Anthony	28,712	57.5	−5.1
Labor	Frederick Braid	16,189	32.4	−5.0
Australia	Lawrence Alderman	5,075	10.2	+10.2
Total formal votes		49,976	99.4	
Informal votes		314	0.6	
Turnout		50,290	95.0	
Two-party-preferred result
Country	Doug Anthony		62.2	−0.4
Labor	Frederick Braid		37.8	+0.4
Country hold		Swing	−0.4	

=== Elections in the 1960s ===
==== 1969 ====
1969 Australian federal election: Richmond
Party	Candidate	Votes	%	±%
Country	Doug Anthony	29,600	62.6	−3.3
Labor	Joseph Gilmore	17,699	37.4	+24.6
Total formal votes		47,299	99.2	
Informal votes		374	0.8	
Turnout		47,673	95.8	
Country hold		Swing	−4.6	

==== 1966 ====
1966 Australian federal election: Richmond
Party	Candidate	Votes	%	±%
Country	Doug Anthony	26,030	65.9	−0.3
Independent	Keith Compton	8,407	21.3	+21.3
Labor	Ernest Jones	5,043	12.8	−19.4
Total formal votes		39,480	98.7	
Informal votes		504	1.3	
Turnout		39,984	95.3	
Two-party-preferred result
Country	Doug Anthony		67.2	+0.2
Independent	Keith Compton		32.8	+32.8
Country hold		Swing	+0.2	

==== 1963 ====
1963 Australian federal election: Richmond
Party	Candidate	Votes	%	±%
Country	Doug Anthony	26,389	66.2	−2.3
Labor	Matthew Walsh	12,841	32.2	−3.9
Independent	Peter Bray	607	1.5	+1.5
Total formal votes		39,837	99.4	
Informal votes		236	0.6	
Turnout		40,073	95.5	
Two-party-preferred result
Country	Doug Anthony		67.0	+3.1
Labor	Matthew Walsh		33.0	−3.1
Country hold		Swing	+3.1	

==== 1961 ====
1961 Australian federal election: Richmond
Party	Candidate	Votes	%	±%
Country	Doug Anthony	25,301	63.9	−5.9
Labor	Raymond Freeman	14,318	36.1	+9.2
Total formal votes		39,619	98.8	
Informal votes		488	1.2	
Turnout		40,107	95.4	
Country hold		Swing	−7.6	

=== Elections in the 1950s ===
==== 1958 ====
1958 Australian federal election: Richmond
Party	Candidate	Votes	%	±%
Country	Doug Anthony	27,516	69.8	−30.2
Labor	William Smith	10,589	26.9	+26.9
Independent	Timothy Donnelly	1,292	3.3	+3.3
Total formal votes		39,397	98.5	
Informal votes		600	1.5	
Turnout		39,997	96.3	
Two-party-preferred result
Country	Doug Anthony		71.5	−28.5
Labor	William Smith		28.5	+28.5
Country hold		Swing	−28.5	

==== 1957 by-election ====
Richmond by-election, 1957
Party	Candidate	Votes	%	±%
Country	Doug Anthony	18,819	49.8	+49.8
Labor	William Smith	10,276	27.2	+27.2
Country	Raymond Gordon	4,678	12.4	+12.4
Country	Oswald Jackson	1,696	4.5	+4.5
Country	Raymond O'Neill	1,241	3.3	+3.3
Independent	Cynthia Wilson	1,057	2.8	+2.8
Total formal votes		37,767	98.7	
Informal votes		487	1.3	
Turnout		38,254	92.3	
Two-party-preferred result
Country	Doug Anthony		69.7	+69.7
Labor	William Smith		30.3	+30.3
Country hold		Swing		

==== 1955 ====
1955 Australian federal election: Richmond
Party	Candidate	Votes	%	±%
Country	Larry Anthony	unopposed		
Country hold		Swing		

==== 1954 ====
1954 Australian federal election: Richmond
Party	Candidate	Votes	%	±%
Country	Larry Anthony	unopposed		
Country hold		Swing		

==== 1951 ====
1951 Australian federal election: Richmond
Party	Candidate	Votes	%	±%
Country	Larry Anthony	28,034	76.3	+1.2
Labor	Alexander Bryen	8,718	23.7	−1.2
Total formal votes		36,752	98.7	
Informal votes		486	1.3	
Turnout		37,238	96.4	
Country hold		Swing	+1.2	

=== Elections in the 1940s ===
==== 1949 ====
1949 Australian federal election: Richmond
Party	Candidate	Votes	%	±%
Country	Larry Anthony	27,504	75.1	+6.0
Labor	Alexander Bryen	9,139	24.9	−6.0
Total formal votes		36,643	98.8	
Informal votes		441	1.2	
Turnout		37,084	96.2	
Country hold		Swing	+6.0	

==== 1946 ====
1946 Australian federal election: Richmond
Party	Candidate	Votes	%	±%
Country	Larry Anthony	37,826	68.3	+20.1
Labor	Keith Compton	17,567	31.7	+0.1
Total formal votes		55,393	98.6	
Informal votes		814	1.4	
Turnout		56,207	93.7	
Country hold		Swing	+4.7	

==== 1943 ====
1943 Australian federal election: Richmond
Party	Candidate	Votes	%	±%
Country	Larry Anthony	25,929	48.2	−16.7
Labor	Arthur Dodd	17,030	31.6	+0.6
One Parliament	Alfred Anderson	10,888	20.2	+20.2
Total formal votes		53,847	98.7	
Informal votes		712	1.3	
Turnout		54,559	95.8	
Two-party-preferred result
Country	Larry Anthony	34,246	63.6	−3.3
Labor	Arthur Dodd	19,601	36.4	+3.3
Country hold		Swing	−3.3	

==== 1940 ====
1940 Australian federal election: Richmond
Party	Candidate	Votes	%	±%
Country	Larry Anthony	34,311	64.9	−5.7
Labor	Jim Fredericks	16,380	31.0	+1.7
State Labor	Alexander Collingridge	2,146	4.1	+4.1
Total formal votes		52,837	98.8	
Informal votes		647	1.2	
Turnout		53,484	94.2	
Two-party-preferred result
Country	Larry Anthony		66.9	−3.7
Labor	Jim Fredericks		32.1	+3.7
Country hold		Swing	−3.7	

=== Elections in the 1930s ===
==== 1937 ====
1937 Australian federal election: Richmond
Party	Candidate	Votes	%	±%
Country	Roland Green	15,842	30.3	−1.2
Labor	Jim Fredericks	15,253	29.3	+29.3
Country	Larry Anthony	12,524	24.1	+24.1
Country	Robert Gibson	8,433	16.2	+16.2
Total formal votes		52,052	97.6	
Informal votes		1,276	2.4	
Turnout		53,328	97.0	
Two-party-preferred result
Country	Larry Anthony	28,940	55.6	+4.5
Country	Roland Green	23,112	44.4	+44.4
Country hold		Swing	+4.5	

==== 1934 ====
1934 Australian federal election: Richmond
Party	Candidate	Votes	%	±%
Country	Roland Green	14,230	28.6	−7.0
Labor (NSW)	Jim Fredericks	13,992	28.2	+28.2
Country	Jim Eggins	13,570	27.3	+27.3
Country	Robert Gibson	7,887	15.9	+15.9
Total formal votes		49,679	97.1	
Informal votes		1,478	2.9	
Turnout		51,157	95.8	
Two-party-preferred result
Country	Roland Green	25,366	51.1	+51.1
Country	Jim Eggins	24,313	48.9	+48.9
Country hold		Swing	+51.1	

==== 1931 ====
1931 Australian federal election: Richmond
Party	Candidate	Votes	%	±%
Country	Roland Green	14,342	35.2	−20.5
Country	Robert Gibson	10,874	26.7	+26.7
Independent	Jim Fredericks	8,383	20.5	+20.5
Country	Percy Tighe	5,830	14.3	+14.3
Country	Leonard Greening	1,370	3.4	+3.4
Total formal votes		40,799	93.7	
Informal votes		2,736	6.3	
Turnout		43,535	94.5	
Two-party-preferred result
Country	Roland Green	20,562	50.4	+50.4
Country	Robert Gibson	20,237	49.6	+49.6
Country hold		Swing	+50.4	

=== Elections in the 1920s ===
==== 1929 ====
1929 Australian federal election: Richmond
Party	Candidate	Votes	%	±%
Country	Roland Green	24,400	64.0	+64.0
Country	Robert Gibson	13,748	36.0	+36.0
Total formal votes		38,148	95.3	
Informal votes		1,883	4.7	
Turnout		40,031	94.2	
Country hold		Swing	+0.0	

==== 1928 ====
1928 Australian federal election: Richmond
Party	Candidate	Votes	%	±%
Country	Roland Green	unopposed		
Country hold		Swing		

==== 1925 ====
1925 Australian federal election: Richmond
Party	Candidate	Votes	%	±%
Country	Roland Green	11,755	31.8	+5.2
Labor	Harry Green	11,257	30.4	+30.4
Country	John Williams	7,051	19.1	+19.1
Nationalist	Joseph Greene	6,935	18.7	−26.1
Total formal votes		36,998	97.2	
Informal votes		1,057	2.8	
Turnout		38,055	88.3	
Two-party-preferred result
Country	Roland Green	25,056	67.7	+14.4
Labor	Harry Green	11,942	32.3	+32.3
Country hold		Swing	+14.4	

==== 1922 ====
1922 Australian federal election: Richmond
Party	Candidate	Votes	%	±%
Country	Roland Green	9,848	45.7	+45.7
Nationalist	Walter Massy-Greene	9,660	44.8	−20.6
Independent	John Steel	2,039	9.5	+9.5
Total formal votes		21,547	96.8	
Informal votes		716	3.2	
Turnout		22,263	55.9	
Two-party-preferred result
Country	Roland Green	11,491	53.3	+53.3
Nationalist	Walter Massy-Greene	10,056	46.7	−24.0
Country gain from Nationalist		Swing	+24.0	

=== Elections in the 1910s ===
==== 1919 ====
1919 Australian federal election: Richmond
Party	Candidate	Votes	%	±%
Nationalist	Walter Massy-Greene	14,215	66.9	−8.3
Labor	Ernest O'Dea	4,650	21.9	−2.9
Independent	John Steel	2,384	11.2	+11.2
Total formal votes		21,249	93.8	
Informal votes		1,412	6.2	
Turnout		22,661	66.7	
Two-party-preferred result
Nationalist	Walter Massy-Greene		72.5	−2.7
Labor	Ernest O'Dea		27.5	+2.7
Nationalist hold		Swing	−2.7	

==== 1917 ====
1917 Australian federal election: Richmond
Party	Candidate	Votes	%	±%
Nationalist	Walter Massy-Greene	17,732	75.2	−24.8
Labor	John Steele	5,843	24.8	+24.8
Total formal votes		23,575	96.1	
Informal votes		966	3.9	
Turnout		24,541	71.3	
Nationalist hold		Swing	−24.8	

==== 1914 ====
1914 Australian federal election: Richmond
Party	Candidate	Votes	%	±%
Liberal	Walter Massy-Greene	unopposed		
Liberal hold		Swing	unopposed	

==== 1913 ====
1913 Australian federal election: Richmond
Party	Candidate	Votes	%	±%
Liberal	Walter Massy-Greene	16,954	69.9	+32.3
Labor	Percy Tighe	7,286	30.1	+15.4
Total formal votes		24,240	97.9	
Informal votes		510	2.1	
Turnout		24,750	71.2	
Liberal hold		Swing	+15.7	

==== 1910 ====
1910 Australian federal election: Richmond
Party	Candidate	Votes	%	±%
Liberal	Walter Massy-Greene	6,843	37.3	−62.7
Independent Labour	Robert Pyers	5,319	29.0	+29.0
Independent Liberal	Venour Nathan	3,311	18.1	+18.1
Labour	William Gillies	2,858	15.6	+15.6
Total formal votes		18,331	98.4	
Informal votes		303	1.6	
Turnout		18,634	59.4	
Liberal hold		Swing	−62.7	

=== Elections in the 1900s ===
==== 1906 ====
1906 Australian federal election: Richmond
Party	Candidate	Votes	%	±%
Protectionist	Thomas Ewing	6,042	76.4	+3.8
Anti-Socialist	John Sutton	1,869	23.6	−3.8
Total formal votes		7,911	96.8	
Informal votes		260	3.2	
Turnout		8,171	31.5	
Protectionist hold		Swing	+3.8	

==== 1903 ====
1903 Australian federal election: Richmond
Party	Candidate	Votes	%	±%
Protectionist	Thomas Ewing	6,096	72.6	+17.3
Free Trade	Reginald Atkinson	2,296	27.4	+27.4
Total formal votes		8,392	97.5	
Informal votes		214	2.5	
Turnout		8,606	45.3	
Protectionist hold		Swing	+17.3	

==== 1901 ====
1901 Australian federal election: Richmond
Party	Candidate	Votes	%	±%
Protectionist	Thomas Ewing	3,646	55.3	+55.3
Ind. Protectionist	Robert Pyers	2,942	44.7	+44.7
Total formal votes		6,558	97.8	
Informal votes		145	2.2	
Turnout		6,733	67.0	
Protectionist win		(new seat)		
