= Results of the 2007 Australian federal election in New South Wales =

2007 Australian federal election (New South Wales)
- 24 November 2007

All 49 New South Wales seats in the Australian House of Representatives and 6 seats in the Australian Senate
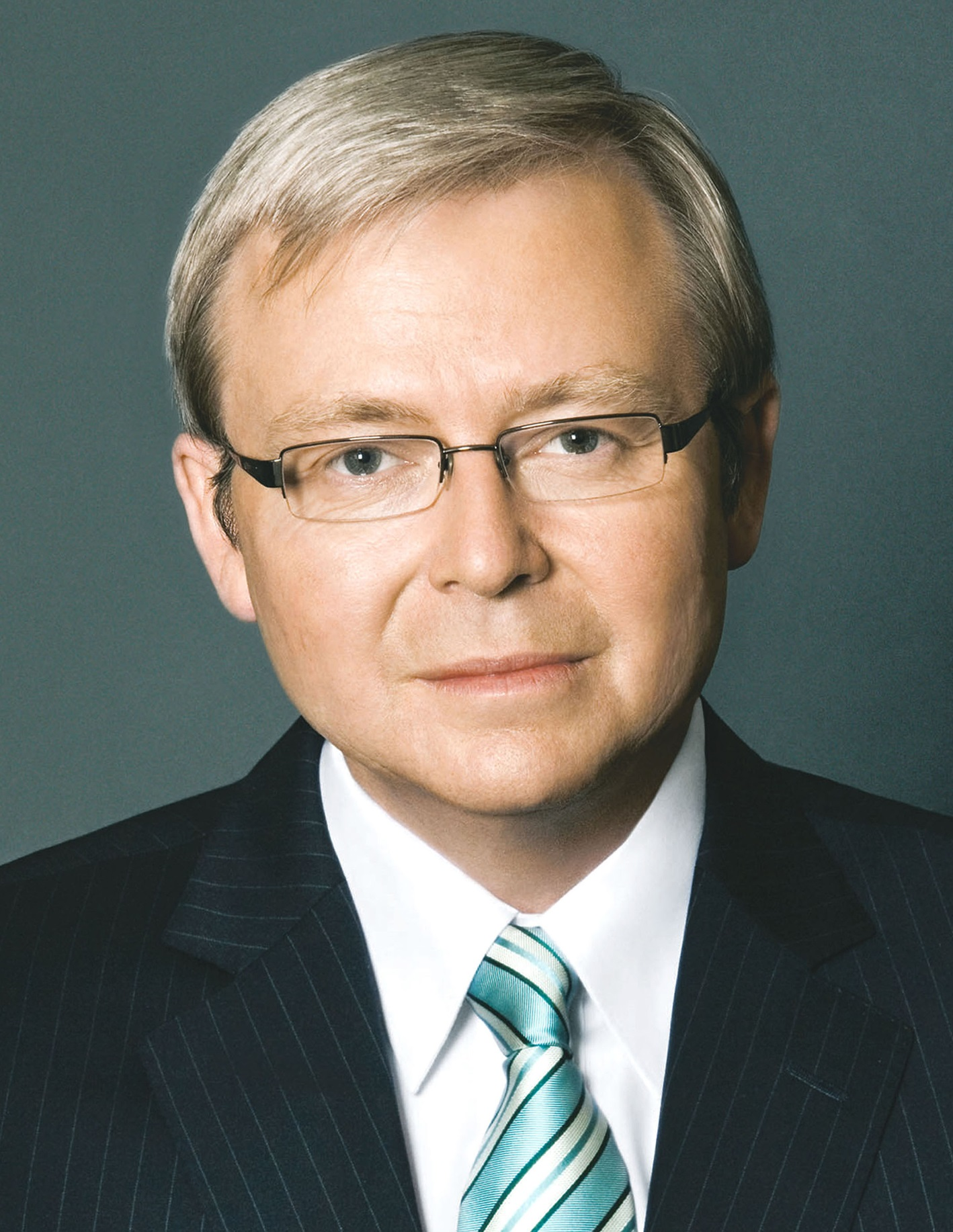

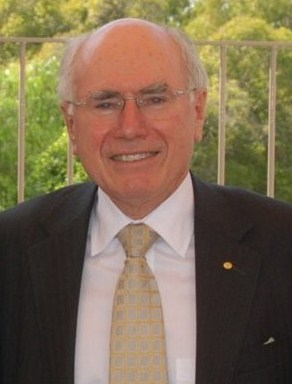
| | First party | Second party |
|---|---|---|
| Leader | Kevin Rudd | John Howard |
| Party | Labor | Liberal/National coalition |
| Last election | 21 seats | 21 seats |
| Seats won | 28 seats | 15 seats |
| Seat change | ▲7 | ▼6 |
| Percentage | 44.12% | 40.53% |
| Swing | ▲7.24 | ▼4.82 |
| TPP | 53.68% | 46.32% |
| TPP swing | ▲5.61 | ▼5.61 |
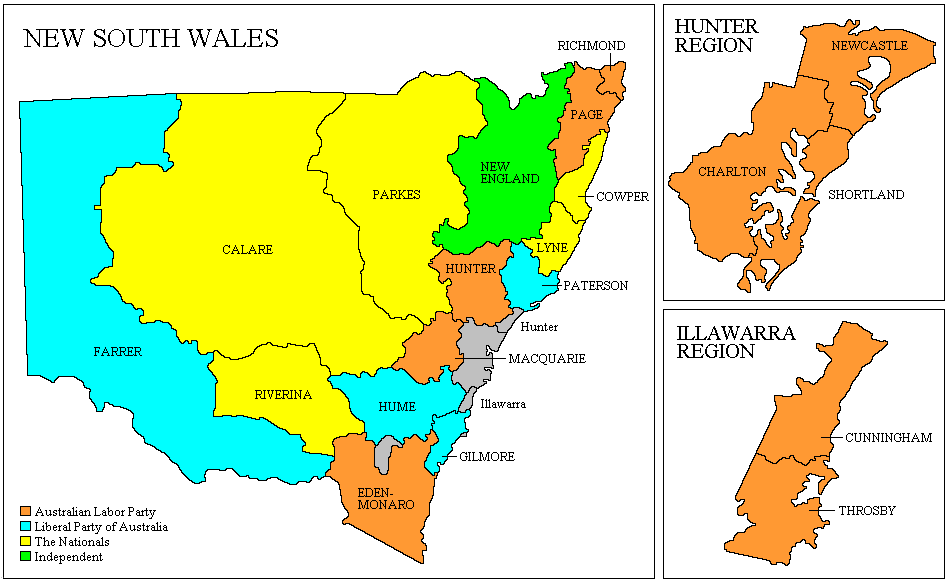
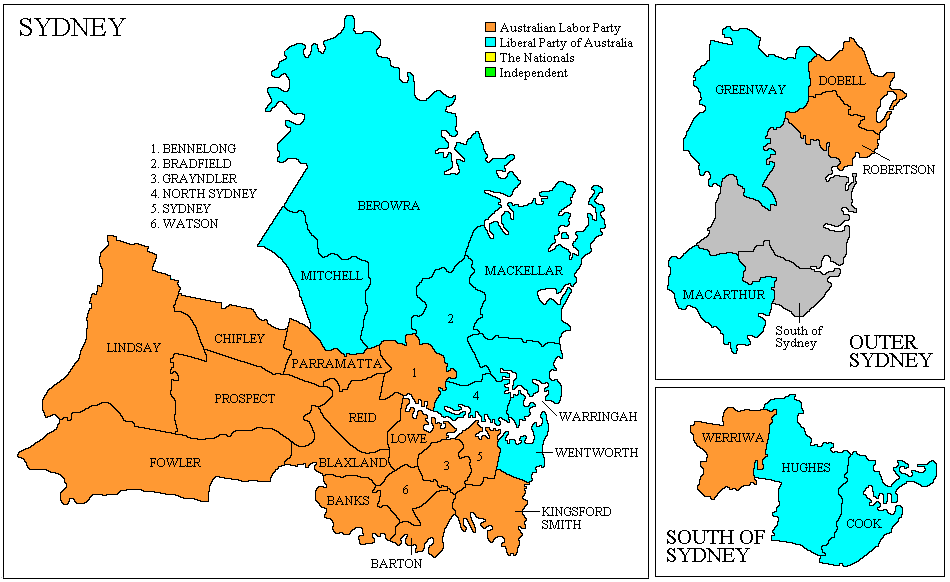

This is a list of electoral division results in the Australian 2007 federal election for the state of New South Wales.

This election was held using instant-runoff voting. At this election, there were three "turn-overs" in New South Wales. Labor won the seats of Bennelong and Robertson despite the Liberals finishing first, as well as the seat of Page despite the Nationals finishing first.

== Overall ==
Turnout 94.99% (CV) — Informal 4.95%
| Party | Votes | % | Swing | Seats | Change |
|---|---|---|---|---|---|
| Labor | 1,791,171 | 44.12 | +7.42 | 28 | ▲7 |
| Liberal | 1,324,311 | 32.62 | –3.54 | 15 | ▼6 |
| National | 321,182 | 7.91 | –1.28 | 5 | ▼1 |
| Liberal–National coalition | 1,645,493 | 40.53 | −4.81 | 20 | ▼7 |
| Greens | 320,031 | 7.88 | –0.21 | | |
| Christian Democrats | 77,903 | 1.92 | +0.70 | | |
| Family First Party | 35,469 | 0.87 | +0.10 | | |
| Australian Democrats | 11,106 | 0.27 | –0.80 | | |
| Climate Change Coalition | 9,470 | 0.23 | +0.23 | | |
| Citizens Electoral Council | 9,045 | 0.22 | –0.08 | | |
| One Nation | 8,426 | 0.21 | –1.19 | | |
| Liberty and Democracy Party | 4,906 | 0.12 | +0.12 | | |
| Socialist Alliance | 3,970 | 0.10 | –0.01 | | |
| Socialist Equality Party (Note: Unknown if this is the same group that would be known as Socialist Equality Party from 2010 onwards) | 3,435 | 0.08 | +0.08 | | |
| Climate Conservatives | 2,074 | 0.05 | +0.05 | | |
| The Fishing Party | 1,073 | 0.03 | –0.04 | | |
| Non-Custodial Parents Party | 795 | 0.02 | –0.01 | | |
| Independents | 134,424 | 3.31 | –0.69 | 1 | ▼1 |
| Not Affiliated | 695 | 0.02 | –0.02 | | |
| Total | 4,059,486 | | | 49 | ▼1 |
Two-party-preferred vote
| Labor | 2,179,029 | 53.68 | +5.61 | 28 | ▲7 |
| Liberal/National coalition | 1,880,457 | 46.32 | –5.61 | 20 | ▼7 |
| Invalid/blank votes | 211,519 | 4.95 | −1.17 | | |
| Registered voters/turnout | 4,496,208 | 94.99 | | | |
Source: Commonwealth Election 2007

Independents: Tony Windsor

Liberal to Labor: Bennelong, Dobell, Eden-Monaro, Lindsay, Parramatta (notional), Robertson

National to Labor: Page

Independent to National: Calare

Gwydir (National) was abolished in the last redistribution. Liberal-held Macquarie, a notionally Labor seat, was also won by the Labor Party.

== New South Wales ==
Primary reference:

=== Banks ===
This section is an excerpt from Electoral results for the Division of Banks § 2007

2007 Australian federal election: Banks
| Party | Candidate | Votes | % | ±% |
|---|---|---|---|---|
| Labor | Daryl Melham | 45,059 | 54.62 | +8.37 |
| Liberal | Bruce Morrow | 27,728 | 33.61 | −6.60 |
| Greens | Susan Roberts | 4,612 | 5.59 | +0.91 |
| Christian Democrats | Stephen Chavura | 3,180 | 3.85 | +0.27 |
| Citizens Electoral Council | Huu Khoa Nguyen | 1,430 | 1.73 | +1.68 |
| Liberty & Democracy | Don Nguyen | 492 | 0.60 | +0.60 |
| Total formal votes | | 82,501 | 93.64 | +1.57 |
| Informal votes | | 5,608 | 6.36 | −1.57 |
| Turnout | | 88,109 | 95.02 | −0.29 |
Two-party-preferred result
| Labor | Daryl Melham | 50,392 | 61.08 | +7.86 |
| Liberal | Bruce Morrow | 32,109 | 38.92 | −7.86 |
| Labor hold | | Swing | +7.86 | |

=== Barton ===
This section is an excerpt from Electoral results for the Division of Barton § 2007

2007 Australian federal election: Barton
| Party | Candidate | Votes | % | ±% |
|---|---|---|---|---|
| Labor | Robert McClelland | 45,292 | 55.26 | +5.61 |
| Liberal | John La Mela | 27,425 | 33.46 | −5.94 |
| Greens | Michele McKenzie | 6,784 | 8.28 | +1.34 |
| Christian Democrats | Chris Svolos | 2,465 | 3.01 | +3.01 |
| Total formal votes | | 81,966 | 94.44 | +1.43 |
| Informal votes | | 4,829 | 5.56 | −1.43 |
| Turnout | | 86,795 | 94.97 | +1.10 |
Two-party-preferred result
| Labor | Robert McClelland | 50,902 | 62.10 | +4.53 |
| Liberal | John La Mela | 31,064 | 37.90 | −4.53 |
| Labor hold | | Swing | +4.53 | |

=== Bennelong ===
This section is an excerpt from Electoral results for the Division of Bennelong § 2007

2007 Australian federal election: Bennelong
| Party | Candidate | Votes | % | ±% |
|---|---|---|---|---|
| Liberal | John Howard | 39,551 | 45.49 | −4.14 |
| Labor | Maxine McKew | 39,408 | 45.33 | +16.18 |
| Greens | Lindsay Peters | 4,811 | 5.53 | −10.08 |
| Christian Democrats | Robyn Peebles | 1,119 | 1.29 | −1.06 |
| Democrats | Peter Goldfinch | 610 | 0.70 | −0.56 |
| Family First | Lorraine Markwell | 289 | 0.33 | +0.24 |
| Climate Change | Margherita Tracanelli | 269 | 0.31 | +0.31 |
| One Nation | Victor Waterson | 261 | 0.30 | +0.23 |
| Independent | Graeme Cordiner | 239 | 0.27 | +0.27 |
| Independent | David Allen | 123 | 0.14 | +0.14 |
| | Yusuf Tahir | 97 | 0.11 | +0.11 |
| Liberty & Democracy | David Leyonhjelm | 89 | 0.10 | +0.10 |
| Citizens Electoral Council | Gavin Spencer | 70 | 0.08 | +0.08 |
| Total formal votes | | 86,936 | 93.78 | −0.24 |
| Informal votes | | 5,764 | 6.22 | +0.24 |
| Turnout | | 92,700 | 95.01 | +0.02 |
Two-party-preferred result
| Labor | Maxine McKew | 44,685 | 51.40 | +5.53 |
| Liberal | John Howard | 42,251 | 48.60 | −5.53 |
| Labor gain from Liberal | | Swing | +5.53 | |

=== Berowra ===
This section is an excerpt from Electoral results for the Division of Berowra § 2007

2007 Australian federal election: Berowra
| Party | Candidate | Votes | % | ±% |
|---|---|---|---|---|
| Liberal | Philip Ruddock | 44,525 | 53.42 | −4.38 |
| Labor | Michael Colnan | 25,563 | 30.67 | +5.71 |
| Greens | Wendy McMurdo | 7,653 | 9.18 | +0.00 |
| Christian Democrats | Ray Levick | 2,125 | 2.55 | −0.52 |
| Independent | Mick Gallagher | 1,456 | 1.75 | +1.75 |
| Family First | Sam Ellis | 1,049 | 1.26 | +0.15 |
| Democrats | Rob McFarlane | 974 | 1.17 | −0.65 |
| Total formal votes | | 83,345 | 95.22 | +0.89 |
| Informal votes | | 4,188 | 4.78 | −0.89 |
| Turnout | | 87,533 | 95.47 | +0.10 |
Two-party-preferred result
| Liberal | Philip Ruddock | 49,122 | 58.94 | −4.88 |
| Labor | Michael Colnan | 34,223 | 41.06 | +4.88 |
| Liberal hold | | Swing | −4.88 | |

=== Blaxland ===
This section is an excerpt from Electoral results for the Division of Blaxland § 2007

2007 Australian federal election: Blaxland
| Party | Candidate | Votes | % | ±% |
|---|---|---|---|---|
| Labor | Jason Clare | 47,495 | 61.32 | +5.09 |
| Liberal | Mark Majewski | 18,665 | 24.10 | −5.34 |
| Greens | John Ky | 5,004 | 6.46 | +1.14 |
| Christian Democrats | Chris McLachlan | 1,850 | 2.39 | −0.14 |
| Independent | Harry Stavrinos | 1,535 | 1.98 | +1.98 |
| One Nation | Bob Vinnicombe | 1,202 | 1.55 | −1.86 |
| Family First | Gabrielle Kent | 1,183 | 1.53 | +1.53 |
| Socialist Alliance | Raul Bassi | 522 | 0.67 | +0.17 |
| Total formal votes | | 77,456 | 90.51 | +0.78 |
| Informal votes | | 8,126 | 9.49 | −0.78 |
| Turnout | | 85,582 | 93.26 | +0.12 |
Two-party-preferred result
| Labor | Jason Clare | 52,953 | 68.37 | +3.14 |
| Liberal | Mark Majewski | 24,503 | 31.63 | −3.14 |
| Labor hold | | Swing | +3.14 | |

=== Bradfield ===
This section is an excerpt from Electoral results for the Division of Bradfield § 2007

2007 Australian federal election: Bradfield
| Party | Candidate | Votes | % | ±% |
|---|---|---|---|---|
| Liberal | Brendan Nelson | 49,817 | 59.07 | −3.41 |
| Labor | Victoria Brookman | 22,509 | 26.69 | +5.11 |
| Greens | Susie Gemmell | 9,495 | 11.26 | +0.01 |
| Christian Democrats | Witold Wiszniewski | 1,466 | 1.74 | +1.45 |
| Family First | James Turnbull | 759 | 0.90 | −0.88 |
| Citizens Electoral Council | Robert H. Butler | 285 | 0.34 | +0.34 |
| Total formal votes | | 84,331 | 96.01 | +0.53 |
| Informal votes | | 3,501 | 3.99 | −0.53 |
| Turnout | | 87,832 | 94.04 | −0.55 |
Two-party-preferred result
| Liberal | Brendan Nelson | 53,512 | 63.45 | −4.10 |
| Labor | Victoria Brookman | 30,819 | 36.55 | +4.10 |
| Liberal hold | | Swing | −4.10 | |

=== Calare ===
This section is an excerpt from Electoral results for the Division of Calare § 2007

2007 Australian federal election: Calare
| Party | Candidate | Votes | % | ±% |
|---|---|---|---|---|
| National | John Cobb | 39,941 | 48.48 | +10.06 |
| Labor | Michael Allen | 20,266 | 24.60 | +4.76 |
| Independent | Gavin Priestley | 19,035 | 23.10 | +23.10 |
| Greens | Jeremy Buckingham | 2,351 | 2.85 | +0.17 |
| Citizens Electoral Council | David John Simpson | 794 | 0.96 | +0.13 |
| Total formal votes | | 82,387 | 96.56 | +0.19 |
| Informal votes | | 2,933 | 3.44 | −0.19 |
| Turnout | | 85,320 | 95.78 | −0.80 |
Two-party-preferred result
| National | John Cobb | 51,124 | 62.05 | +0.64 |
| Labor | Michael Allen | 31,263 | 37.95 | −0.64 |
| National notional hold | | Swing | +0.64 | |

The sitting member was Peter Andren (Independent) however a redistribution effectively cut Calare in half and Andren did not contest the election.

=== Charlton ===
This section is an excerpt from Electoral results for the Division of Charlton § 2007

2007 Australian federal election: Charlton
| Party | Candidate | Votes | % | ±% |
|---|---|---|---|---|
| Labor | Greg Combet | 44,156 | 53.08 | +6.47 |
| Liberal | Lindsay Paterson | 26,353 | 31.68 | −3.49 |
| Greens | Suzanne Pritchard | 6,708 | 8.06 | −0.71 |
| Independent | Stuart Ulrich | 2,008 | 2.41 | +2.41 |
| Christian Democrats | Jim Kendall | 2,007 | 2.41 | +2.41 |
| Independent | Patrick Barry | 1,253 | 1.51 | +1.51 |
| Socialist Equality | Terry Cook | 404 | 0.49 | +0.49 |
| Citizens Electoral Council | David Stow | 294 | 0.35 | −0.23 |
| Total formal votes | | 83,183 | 95.34 | +0.46 |
| Informal votes | | 4,066 | 4.66 | −0.46 |
| Turnout | | 87,249 | 95.74 | +0.14 |
Two-party-preferred result
| Labor | Greg Combet | 52,298 | 62.87 | +4.47 |
| Liberal | Lindsay Paterson | 30,885 | 37.13 | −4.47 |
| Labor hold | | Swing | +4.47 | |

=== Chifley ===
This section is an excerpt from Electoral results for the Division of Chifley § 2007

2007 Australian federal election: Chifley
| Party | Candidate | Votes | % | ±% |
|---|---|---|---|---|
| Labor | Roger Price | 51,568 | 64.18 | +10.12 |
| Liberal | Jess Diaz | 19,092 | 23.76 | −6.62 |
| Greens | John Forrester | 2,897 | 3.61 | −1.66 |
| Christian Democrats | Dave Vincent | 2,751 | 3.42 | +1.21 |
| One Nation | Louise Kedwell | 1,183 | 1.47 | −0.53 |
| Socialist Equality | James Cogan | 1,069 | 1.33 | +1.33 |
| Family First | Evan Jewell | 1,016 | 1.26 | −0.24 |
| Independent | Wayne Hyland | 484 | 0.60 | −0.24 |
| Independent | Amarjit Tanda | 288 | 0.36 | +0.36 |
| Total formal votes | | 80,348 | 92.01 | +2.90 |
| Informal votes | | 6,976 | 7.99 | −2.90 |
| Turnout | | 87,324 | 94.40 | +0.55 |
Two-party-preferred result
| Labor | Roger Price | 56,776 | 70.66 | +8.69 |
| Liberal | Jess Diaz | 23,572 | 29.34 | −8.69 |
| Labor hold | | Swing | +8.69 | |

=== Cook ===
This section is an excerpt from Electoral results for the Division of Cook § 2007

2007 Australian federal election: Cook
| Party | Candidate | Votes | % | ±% |
|---|---|---|---|---|
| Liberal | Scott Morrison | 45,116 | 52.40 | −5.11 |
| Labor | Mark Buttigieg | 30,921 | 35.91 | +7.69 |
| Greens | Naomi Waizer | 5,342 | 6.20 | −0.82 |
| Christian Democrats | Beth Smith | 1,929 | 2.24 | −0.17 |
| One Nation | Richard Putral | 1,116 | 1.30 | −0.63 |
| Independent | Graeme Strang | 693 | 0.80 | +0.23 |
| Family First | Ari Katsoulas | 596 | 0.69 | +0.69 |
| Independent | Patricia Poulos | 394 | 0.46 | +0.46 |
| Total formal votes | | 86,107 | 96.13 | +1.59 |
| Informal votes | | 3,465 | 3.87 | −1.59 |
| Turnout | | 89,572 | 95.91 | −0.18 |
Two-party-preferred result
| Liberal | Scott Morrison | 48,711 | 56.57 | −6.71 |
| Labor | Mark Buttigieg | 37,395 | 43.43 | +6.71 |
| Liberal hold | | Swing | −6.71 | |

=== Cowper ===
This section is an excerpt from Electoral results for the Division of Cowper § 2007

2007 Australian federal election: Cowper
| Party | Candidate | Votes | % | ±% |
|---|---|---|---|---|
| National | Luke Hartsuyker | 39,444 | 46.54 | −3.92 |
| Labor | Paul Sekfy | 32,276 | 38.08 | +6.43 |
| Greens | John Carty | 9,359 | 11.04 | +2.15 |
| Christian Democrats | Deborah Lions | 2,428 | 2.86 | +2.86 |
| Family First | Flavia Arapi-Nunez | 759 | 0.90 | +0.70 |
| Liberty & Democracy | Leon Belgrave | 491 | 0.58 | +0.58 |
| Total formal votes | | 84,757 | 96.02 | +0.36 |
| Informal votes | | 3,510 | 3.98 | −0.36 |
| Turnout | | 88,267 | 95.15 | +0.48 |
Two-party-preferred result
| National | Luke Hartsuyker | 43,423 | 51.23 | −5.52 |
| Labor | Paul Sekfy | 41,334 | 48.77 | +5.52 |
| National hold | | Swing | −5.52 | |

=== Cunningham ===
This section is an excerpt from Electoral results for the Division of Cunningham § 2007

2007 Australian federal election: Cunningham
| Party | Candidate | Votes | % | ±% |
|---|---|---|---|---|
| Labor | Sharon Bird | 44,835 | 53.23 | +12.46 |
| Liberal | Colin Fowler | 22,438 | 26.64 | −2.45 |
| Greens | Michael Organ | 12,326 | 14.63 | −4.80 |
| Christian Democrats | Nolene Norsworthy | 2,232 | 2.65 | −0.54 |
| Family First | Jemma Tribe | 1,203 | 1.43 | +1.43 |
| Socialist Alliance | Jess Moore | 706 | 0.84 | +0.45 |
| Non-Custodial Parents | John Flanagan | 489 | 0.58 | +0.14 |
| Total formal votes | | 84,229 | 96.04 | +2.40 |
| Informal votes | | 3,471 | 3.96 | −2.40 |
| Turnout | | 87,700 | 95.68 | +0.26 |
Two-party-preferred result
| Labor | Sharon Bird | 57,382 | 68.13 | +6.51 |
| Liberal | Colin Fowler | 26,847 | 31.87 | −6.51 |
| Labor hold | | Swing | +6.51 | |

=== Dobell ===
This section is an excerpt from Electoral results for the Division of Dobell § 2007

2007 Australian federal election: Dobell
| Party | Candidate | Votes | % | ±% |
|---|---|---|---|---|
| Labor | Craig Thomson | 38,168 | 46.32 | +8.85 |
| Liberal | Ken Ticehurst | 34,865 | 42.31 | −6.32 |
| Greens | Scott Rickard | 4,429 | 5.38 | +0.28 |
| Independent | Doug Eaton | 1,639 | 1.99 | +1.99 |
| Christian Democrats | Michael Darby | 1,549 | 1.88 | +1.88 |
| Family First | Hadden Ervin | 1,407 | 1.71 | −0.49 |
| Liberty & Democracy | Graeme Bird | 182 | 0.22 | +0.22 |
| Citizens Electoral Council | Steve Hughes | 157 | 0.19 | +0.03 |
| Total formal votes | | 82,396 | 95.68 | +2.96 |
| Informal votes | | 3,719 | 4.32 | −2.97 |
| Turnout | | 86,115 | 95.34 | +0.42 |
Two-party-preferred result
| Labor | Craig Thomson | 44,413 | 53.90 | +8.74 |
| Liberal | Ken Ticehurst | 37,983 | 46.10 | −8.74 |
| Labor gain from Liberal | | Swing | +8.74 | |

=== Eden-Monaro ===
This section is an excerpt from Electoral results for the Division of Eden-Monaro § 2007

2007 Australian federal election: Eden-Monaro
| Party | Candidate | Votes | % | ±% |
|---|---|---|---|---|
| Labor | Mike Kelly | 37,724 | 44.56 | +6.64 |
| Liberal | Gary Nairn | 36,863 | 43.55 | −5.85 |
| Greens | Keith Hughes | 6,303 | 7.45 | +0.53 |
| Independent | Acacia Rose | 1,924 | 2.27 | +2.27 |
| Christian Democrats | Matthew Chivers | 911 | 1.08 | −0.30 |
| Family First | Peter Harris | 657 | 0.78 | +0.58 |
| Liberty & Democracy | Tim Quilty | 272 | 0.32 | +0.32 |
| Total formal votes | | 84,654 | 96.31 | +1.10 |
| Informal votes | | 3,239 | 3.69 | −1.10 |
| Turnout | | 87,893 | 95.94 | +0.67 |
Two-party-preferred result
| Labor | Mike Kelly | 45,207 | 53.40 | +6.67 |
| Liberal | Gary Nairn | 39,447 | 46.60 | −6.67 |
| Labor gain from Liberal | | Swing | +6.67 | |

=== Farrer ===
This section is an excerpt from Electoral results for the Division of Farrer § 2007

2007 Australian federal election: Farrer
| Party | Candidate | Votes | % | ±% |
|---|---|---|---|---|
| Liberal | Sussan Ley | 49,794 | 57.73 | +5.90 |
| Labor | Chris Ryan | 28,238 | 32.74 | +6.30 |
| Greens | Darran Stonehouse | 4,169 | 4.83 | +1.28 |
| Family First | Rhonda Lever | 2,657 | 3.08 | +1.59 |
| Climate Conservatives | Douglas McGregor Henderson | 1,088 | 1.26 | +1.26 |
| Citizens Electoral Council | Pat Mathers | 313 | 0.36 | −0.15 |
| Total formal votes | | 86,259 | 96.18 | +2.38 |
| Informal votes | | 3,427 | 3.82 | −2.38 |
| Turnout | | 89,686 | 95.49 | −0.52 |
Two-party-preferred result
| Liberal | Sussan Ley | 52,766 | 61.17 | −5.46 |
| Labor | Chris Ryan | 33,493 | 38.83 | +5.46 |
| Liberal hold | | Swing | −5.46 | |

=== Fowler ===
This section is an excerpt from Electoral results for the Division of Fowler § 2007

2007 Australian federal election: Fowler
| Party | Candidate | Votes | % | ±% |
|---|---|---|---|---|
| Labor | Julia Irwin | 50,180 | 64.25 | +8.54 |
| Liberal | Rose Torossian | 21,706 | 27.79 | −5.07 |
| Greens | Vlaudin Vega | 4,278 | 5.49 | −0.10 |
| Christian Democrats | Paul Termeulen | 1,932 | 2.47 | +1.78 |
| Total formal votes | | 78,107 | 92.33 | +1.20 |
| Informal votes | | 6,490 | 7.67 | −1.20 |
| Turnout | | 84,597 | 94.88 | +0.75 |
Two-party-preferred result
| Labor | Julia Irwin | 53,306 | 68.25 | +4.93 |
| Liberal | Rose Torossian | 24,801 | 31.75 | −4.93 |
| Labor hold | | Swing | +4.93 | |

=== Gilmore ===
This section is an excerpt from Electoral results for the Division of Gilmore § 2007

2007 Australian federal election: Gilmore
| Party | Candidate | Votes | % | ±% |
|---|---|---|---|---|
| Liberal | Joanna Gash | 40,513 | 50.39 | −3.83 |
| Labor | Neil Reilly | 30,386 | 37.79 | +5.71 |
| Greens | Ben van der Wijngaart | 6,070 | 7.55 | +0.32 |
| Christian Democrats | Bohdan Brumerskyj | 1,755 | 2.18 | −1.71 |
| Independent | Of The Above None | 686 | 0.85 | +0.85 |
| Family First | Brett Greenhalgh | 407 | 0.51 | +0.51 |
| Climate Conservatives | Simon Blake | 370 | 0.46 | +0.46 |
| Liberty & Democracy | Kevin Ramsey | 151 | 0.19 | +0.19 |
| Citizens Electoral Council | Warwick Hunt | 59 | 0.07 | −0.09 |
| Total formal votes | | 80,397 | 95.79 | +0.24 |
| Informal votes | | 3,536 | 4.21 | −0.24 |
| Turnout | | 83,933 | 95.88 | +0.61 |
Two-party-preferred result
| Liberal | Joanna Gash | 43,467 | 54.07 | −5.34 |
| Labor | Neil Reilly | 36,930 | 45.93 | +5.34 |
| Liberal hold | | Swing | −5.34 | |

=== Grayndler ===
This section is an excerpt from Electoral results for the Division of Grayndler § 2007

2007 Australian federal election: Grayndler
| Party | Candidate | Votes | % | ±% |
|---|---|---|---|---|
| Labor | Anthony Albanese | 46,509 | 55.47 | +4.77 |
| Liberal | Daniel Caffery | 17,485 | 20.86 | −4.77 |
| Greens | Saeed Khan | 15,675 | 18.70 | −1.34 |
| Democrats | Jeffrey Gabriel | 1,407 | 1.68 | −0.35 |
| Socialist Alliance | Pip Hinman | 1,394 | 1.66 | +0.45 |
| Christian Democrats | Ehab Hennien | 1,042 | 1.24 | +1.06 |
| Socialist Equality | Patrick O'Connor | 328 | 0.39 | +0.39 |
| Total formal votes | | 83,840 | 94.02 | −0.22 |
| Informal votes | | 5,333 | 5.98 | +0.22 |
| Turnout | | 89,173 | 93.82 | +0.59 |
Two-party-preferred result
| Labor | Anthony Albanese | 62,821 | 74.93 | +3.74 |
| Liberal | Daniel Caffery | 21,019 | 25.07 | −3.74 |
| Labor hold | | Swing | +3.74 | |

=== Greenway ===
This section is an excerpt from Electoral results for the Division of Greenway § 2007

2007 Australian federal election: Greenway
| Party | Candidate | Votes | % | ±% |
|---|---|---|---|---|
| Liberal | Louise Markus | 40,338 | 50.10 | −5.07 |
| Labor | Michael Vassili | 30,973 | 38.47 | +9.11 |
| Greens | Leigh Williams | 4,617 | 5.73 | +0.20 |
| Christian Democrats | John Phillips | 1,711 | 2.12 | −0.07 |
| Independent | F Ivor | 1,343 | 1.67 | +1.44 |
| Family First | Joanne Muller | 1,312 | 1.63 | +0.09 |
| Citizens Electoral Council | Goran Reves | 228 | 0.28 | +0.16 |
| Total formal votes | | 80,522 | 95.37 | +4.29 |
| Informal votes | | 3,908 | 4.63 | −4.29 |
| Turnout | | 84,430 | 95.71 | +1.21 |
Two-party-preferred result
| Liberal | Louise Markus | 43,881 | 54.50 | −6.85 |
| Labor | Michael Vassili | 36,641 | 45.50 | +6.85 |
| Liberal hold | | Swing | −6.85 | |

=== Hughes ===
This section is an excerpt from Electoral results for the Division of Hughes § 2007

2007 Australian federal election: Hughes
| Party | Candidate | Votes | % | ±% |
|---|---|---|---|---|
| Liberal | Danna Vale | 40,334 | 48.29 | −4.73 |
| Labor | Greg Holland | 35,087 | 42.01 | +8.26 |
| Greens | Jamie Paterson | 4,646 | 5.56 | −1.20 |
| Christian Democrats | John Vanderjagt | 2,419 | 2.90 | −0.07 |
| Family First | Julie Mezyed | 1,033 | 1.24 | +1.24 |
| Total formal votes | | 83,519 | 95.74 | +1.26 |
| Informal votes | | 3,712 | 4.26 | −1.26 |
| Turnout | | 87,231 | 95.67 | +0.55 |
Two-party-preferred result
| Liberal | Danna Vale | 43,562 | 52.16 | −6.39 |
| Labor | Greg Holland | 39,957 | 47.84 | +6.39 |
| Liberal hold | | Swing | −6.39 | |

=== Hume ===
This section is an excerpt from Electoral results for the Division of Hume § 2007

2007 Australian federal election: Hume
| Party | Candidate | Votes | % | ±% |
|---|---|---|---|---|
| Liberal | Alby Schultz | 41,344 | 49.18 | −7.45 |
| Labor | David Grant | 31,882 | 37.93 | +8.88 |
| Greens | Jim Clark | 6,414 | 7.63 | +0.68 |
| Christian Democrats | Geoff Peet | 2,010 | 2.39 | −1.09 |
| Family First | Cathy Trent | 1,958 | 2.33 | +2.33 |
| Citizens Electoral Council | Lindsay Cosgrove | 455 | 0.54 | −0.08 |
| Total formal votes | | 84,063 | 96.61 | +1.68 |
| Informal votes | | 2,946 | 3.39 | −1.68 |
| Turnout | | 87,009 | 96.18 | +0.92 |
Two-party-preferred result
| Liberal | Alby Schultz | 45,526 | 54.16 | −8.68 |
| Labor | David Grant | 38,537 | 45.84 | +8.68 |
| Liberal hold | | Swing | −8.68 | |

=== Hunter ===
This section is an excerpt from Electoral results for the Division of Hunter § 2007

2007 Australian federal election: Hunter
| Party | Candidate | Votes | % | ±% |
|---|---|---|---|---|
| Labor | Joel Fitzgibbon | 49,561 | 59.95 | +8.64 |
| National | Beth Black | 22,328 | 27.01 | −2.89 |
| Greens | Jan Davis | 5,265 | 6.37 | +0.11 |
| Climate Change | John Harvey | 2,500 | 3.02 | +3.02 |
| Christian Democrats | Bernie Neville | 1,736 | 2.10 | +0.36 |
| Citizens Electoral Council | Daniel Albury | 1,287 | 1.56 | −1.33 |
| Total formal votes | | 82,677 | 95.71 | +0.95 |
| Informal votes | | 3,710 | 4.29 | −0.95 |
| Turnout | | 86,387 | 95.77 | +0.19 |
Two-party-preferred result
| Labor | Joel Fitzgibbon | 54,504 | 65.92 | +4.83 |
| National | Beth Black | 28,173 | 34.08 | −4.83 |
| Labor hold | | Swing | +4.83 | |

=== Kingsford Smith ===
This section is an excerpt from Electoral results for the Division of Kingsford Smith § 2007

2007 Australian federal election: Kingsford Smith
| Party | Candidate | Votes | % | ±% |
|---|---|---|---|---|
| Labor | Peter Garrett | 45,831 | 52.85 | +4.24 |
| Liberal | Caroline Beinke | 29,402 | 33.90 | −2.13 |
| Greens | Sue Mahony | 8,995 | 10.37 | +2.53 |
| Christian Democrats | Marcus Campbell | 1,402 | 1.62 | +1.62 |
| Socialist Equality | Alex Safari | 1,096 | 1.26 | +1.26 |
| Total formal votes | | 86,726 | 94.67 | +2.97 |
| Informal votes | | 4,884 | 5.33 | −2.97 |
| Turnout | | 91,610 | 94.22 | −0.06 |
Two-party-preferred result
| Labor | Peter Garrett | 54,889 | 63.29 | +4.56 |
| Liberal | Caroline Beinke | 31,837 | 36.71 | −4.56 |
| Labor hold | | Swing | +4.56 | |

=== Lindsay ===
This section is an excerpt from Electoral results for the Division of Lindsay § 2007

2007 Australian federal election: Lindsay
| Party | Candidate | Votes | % | ±% |
|---|---|---|---|---|
| Labor | David Bradbury | 41,991 | 51.39 | +11.68 |
| Liberal | Karen Chijoff | 31,176 | 38.15 | −7.49 |
| Greens | Lesley Edwards | 2,759 | 3.38 | −0.38 |
| Christian Democrats | Andrew Green | 2,498 | 3.06 | +0.31 |
| Independent | Lisa Harrold | 953 | 1.17 | +1.17 |
| Family First | Iris Muller | 915 | 1.12 | −0.32 |
| Independent | Kerry McNally | 728 | 0.89 | +0.89 |
| Liberty & Democracy | Grant Bayley | 689 | 0.84 | +0.84 |
| Total formal votes | | 81,709 | 94.46 | +2.32 |
| Informal votes | | 4,791 | 5.54 | −2.32 |
| Turnout | | 86,500 | 95.74 | +0.31 |
Two-party-preferred result
| Labor | David Bradbury | 46,394 | 56.78 | +9.70 |
| Liberal | Karen Chijoff | 35,315 | 43.22 | −9.70 |
| Labor gain from Liberal | | Swing | +9.70 | |

=== Lowe ===
This section is an excerpt from Electoral results for the Division of Lowe § 2007

2007 Australian federal election: Lowe
| Party | Candidate | Votes | % | ±% |
|---|---|---|---|---|
| Labor | John Murphy | 38,766 | 49.27 | +6.23 |
| Liberal | Jim Tsolakis | 31,518 | 40.06 | −2.90 |
| Greens | Marc Rerceretnam | 6,774 | 8.61 | −0.07 |
| Christian Democrats | Bill Shailer | 1,616 | 2.05 | +0.04 |
| Total formal votes | | 78,674 | 95.05 | +1.65 |
| Informal votes | | 4,098 | 4.95 | −1.65 |
| Turnout | | 82,772 | 94.97 | +1.56 |
Two-party-preferred result
| Labor | John Murphy | 45,136 | 57.37 | +4.34 |
| Liberal | Jim Tsolakis | 33,538 | 42.63 | −4.34 |
| Labor hold | | Swing | +4.34 | |

=== Lyne ===
This section is an excerpt from Electoral results for the Division of Lyne § 2007

2007 Australian federal election: Lyne
| Party | Candidate | Votes | % | ±% |
|---|---|---|---|---|
| National | Mark Vaile | 41,319 | 52.26 | −4.44 |
| Labor | James Langley | 25,358 | 32.07 | +5.52 |
| Greens | Susie Russell | 5,649 | 7.15 | +2.37 |
| Independent | Jamie Harrison | 3,326 | 4.21 | +4.21 |
| Christian Democrats | Robert Waldron | 1,679 | 2.12 | +2.12 |
| Independent | Barry Wright | 979 | 1.24 | +1.24 |
| Independent | Stewart Scott-Irving | 330 | 0.42 | +0.42 |
| Independent | Rodger Riach | 238 | 0.30 | +0.30 |
| Citizens Electoral Council | Graeme Muldoon | 184 | 0.23 | −0.02 |
| Total formal votes | | 79,062 | 94.93 | +0.23 |
| Informal votes | | 4,220 | 5.07 | −0.23 |
| Turnout | | 83.282 | 95.96 | +0.55 |
Two-party-preferred result
| National | Mark Vaile | 46,311 | 58.58 | −4.83 |
| Labor | James Langley | 32,751 | 41.42 | +4.83 |
| National hold | | Swing | −4.83 | |

=== Macarthur ===
This section is an excerpt from Electoral results for the Division of Macarthur § 2007

2007 Australian federal election: Macarthur
| Party | Candidate | Votes | % | ±% |
|---|---|---|---|---|
| Liberal | Pat Farmer | 35,996 | 46.98 | −8.79 |
| Labor | Nick Bleasdale | 33,688 | 43.97 | +12.55 |
| Greens | Ben Raue | 3,334 | 4.35 | −0.52 |
| Christian Democrats | Godwin Goh | 1,357 | 1.77 | −0.77 |
| Family First | Douglas Rauch | 1,323 | 1.73 | −0.19 |
| Democrats | Samantha Elliott-Halls | 618 | 0.81 | −0.12 |
| Non-Custodial Parents | Andy Thompson | 306 | 0.40 | +0.40 |
| Total formal votes | | 76,622 | 94.63 | +1.50 |
| Informal votes | | 4,347 | 5.37 | −1.50 |
| Turnout | | 80,969 | 95.66 | +1.24 |
Two-party-preferred result
| Liberal | Pat Farmer | 38,865 | 50.72 | −10.43 |
| Labor | Nick Bleasdale | 37,757 | 49.28 | +10.43 |
| Liberal hold | | Swing | −10.43 | |

=== Mackellar ===
This section is an excerpt from Electoral results for the Division of Mackellar § 2007

2007 Australian federal election: Mackellar
| Party | Candidate | Votes | % | ±% |
|---|---|---|---|---|
| Liberal | Bronwyn Bishop | 47,343 | 56.41 | −0.62 |
| Labor | Chris Sharpe | 20,439 | 24.35 | +4.24 |
| Greens | Craige McWhirter | 9,840 | 11.72 | +1.19 |
| Christian Democrats | Mike Hubbard | 1,955 | 2.33 | +2.33 |
| Climate Change | John Adams | 1,772 | 2.11 | +2.11 |
| Independent | Matt McLellan | 1,651 | 1.97 | +1.97 |
| Democrats | Clinton Barnes | 933 | 1.11 | −0.29 |
| Total formal votes | | 83,933 | 95.29 | +0.11 |
| Informal votes | | 4,150 | 4.71 | −0.11 |
| Turnout | | 88,083 | 95.32 | +1.86 |
Two-party-preferred result
| Liberal | Bronwyn Bishop | 52,395 | 62.42 | −3.04 |
| Labor | Chris Sharpe | 31,538 | 37.58 | +3.04 |
| Liberal hold | | Swing | −3.04 | |

=== Macquarie ===
This section is an excerpt from Electoral results for the Division of Macquarie § 2007

2007 Australian federal election: Macquarie
| Party | Candidate | Votes | % | ±% |
|---|---|---|---|---|
| Labor | Bob Debus | 38,672 | 44.08 | +17.13 |
| Liberal | Kerry Bartlett | 33,197 | 37.84 | −14.93 |
| Greens | Carmel McCallum | 9,092 | 10.36 | +1.94 |
| Independent | Tim Williams | 4,145 | 4.72 | +3.49 |
| Christian Democrats | Robert Gifford | 1,702 | 1.94 | +0.35 |
| Family First | Charles Liptak | 465 | 0.53 | −0.60 |
| Liberty & Democracy | Kirk Fletcher | 355 | 0.40 | +0.40 |
| Citizens Electoral Council | Michael Segedin | 99 | 0.11 | −0.30 |
| Total formal votes | | 87,727 | 96.44 | +0.38 |
| Informal votes | | 3,240 | 3.56 | −0.38 |
| Turnout | | 90,967 | 96.09 | −0.09 |
Two-party-preferred result
| Labor | Bob Debus | 50,037 | 57.04 | +6.57 |
| Liberal | Kerry Bartlett | 37,690 | 42.96 | −6.57 |
| Labor notional hold | | Swing | +6.57 | |

The sitting member was Kerry Bartlett (Liberal) however a redistribution made it a notional Labor seat with a margin of 0.5%.

=== Mitchell ===
This section is an excerpt from Electoral results for the Division of Mitchell § 2007

2007 Australian federal election: Mitchell
| Party | Candidate | Votes | % | ±% |
|---|---|---|---|---|
| Liberal | Alex Hawke | 46,115 | 56.74 | −7.64 |
| Labor | Nigel Gould | 25,211 | 31.02 | +10.02 |
| Greens | Toni Wright-Turner | 4,302 | 5.29 | −0.64 |
| Christian Democrats | Darryl Allen | 2,099 | 2.58 | +0.07 |
| Climate Change | James Fiander | 1,715 | 2.11 | +2.11 |
| Family First | Jarrod Graetz | 1,022 | 1.26 | −0.11 |
| Independent | Jordie Stuart Bodlay | 815 | 1.00 | +0.45 |
| Total formal votes | | 81,279 | 96.12 | +2.73 |
| Informal votes | | 3,278 | 3.88 | −2.73 |
| Turnout | | 84,557 | 95.63 | +1.95 |
Two-party-preferred result
| Liberal | Alex Hawke | 50,058 | 61.59 | −9.09 |
| Labor | Nigel Gould | 31,221 | 38.41 | +9.09 |
| Liberal hold | | Swing | −9.09 | |

=== New England ===
This section is an excerpt from Electoral results for the Division of New England § 2007

2007 Australian federal election: New England
| Party | Candidate | Votes | % | ±% |
|---|---|---|---|---|
| Independent | Tony Windsor | 52,734 | 61.94 | +7.24 |
| National | Phil Betts | 19,850 | 23.31 | +2.54 |
| Labor | Luke Brand | 8,368 | 9.83 | +0.65 |
| Greens | Bruce Taylor | 2,892 | 3.40 | +0.06 |
| One Nation | Brian Dettmann | 1,071 | 1.26 | −0.28 |
| Citizens Electoral Council | Richard Witten | 225 | 0.26 | −0.32 |
| Total formal votes | | 85,140 | 97.12 | −0.09 |
| Informal votes | | 2,522 | 2.88 | +0.09 |
| Turnout | | 87,662 | 95.92 | −0.52 |
Notional two-party-preferred count
| National | Phil Betts | 55,167 | 64.8 | +1.21 |
| Labor | Luke Brand | 29,973 | 35.2 | −1.21 |
Two-candidate-preferred result
| Independent | Tony Windsor | 63,286 | 74.33 | +2.95 |
| National | Phil Betts | 21,854 | 25.67 | −2.95 |
| Independent hold | | Swing | +2.95 | |

=== Newcastle ===
This section is an excerpt from Electoral results for the Division of Newcastle2007

2007 Australian federal election: Newcastle
| Party | Candidate | Votes | % | ±% |
|---|---|---|---|---|
| Labor | Sharon Grierson | 42,936 | 50.78 | +5.21 |
| Liberal | Krysia Walker | 21,611 | 25.56 | −10.71 |
| Greens | Charmian Eckersley | 8,463 | 10.01 | −1.30 |
| Independent | Aaron Buman | 6,343 | 7.50 | +7.50 |
| Family First | Malcolm East | 1,926 | 2.28 | +2.12 |
| Christian Democrats | Milton Caine | 1,064 | 1.26 | +1.26 |
| Democrats | Aaron Johnson | 891 | 1.05 | −1.25 |
| Independent | Joel Curry | 701 | 0.83 | +0.83 |
| Socialist Alliance | Geoff Payne | 333 | 0.39 | −0.14 |
| Socialist Equality | Noel Holt | 277 | 0.33 | +0.33 |
| Total formal votes | | 84,545 | 95.56 | +0.75 |
| Informal votes | | 3,930 | 4.44 | −0.75 |
| Turnout | | 88,475 | 94.67 | −0.82 |
Two-party-preferred result
| Labor | Sharon Grierson | 55,725 | 65.91 | +6.82 |
| Liberal | Krysia Walker | 28,820 | 34.09 | −6.82 |
| Labor hold | | Swing | +6.82 | |

=== North Sydney ===
This section is an excerpt from Electoral results for the Division of North Sydney § 2007

2007 Australian federal election: North Sydney
| Party | Candidate | Votes | % | ±% |
|---|---|---|---|---|
| Liberal | Joe Hockey | 44,177 | 51.81 | −4.42 |
| Labor | Mike Bailey | 30,372 | 35.62 | +8.35 |
| Greens | Ted Nixon | 7,851 | 9.21 | −3.12 |
| Climate Change | Barry Thompson | 1,119 | 1.31 | +1.31 |
| Christian Democrats | Arie Baalbergen | 621 | 0.73 | +0.73 |
| Independent | Marcus Aussie-Stone | 526 | 0.62 | +0.62 |
| Family First | John Cafferatta | 352 | 0.41 | +0.39 |
| Citizens Electoral Council | Kundan Misra | 245 | 0.29 | +0.29 |
| Total formal votes | | 85,263 | 96.53 | +0.19 |
| Informal votes | | 3,061 | 3.47 | −0.19 |
| Turnout | | 88,324 | 93.80 | +0.18 |
Two-party-preferred result
| Liberal | Joe Hockey | 47,222 | 55.38 | −4.66 |
| Labor | Mike Bailey | 38,041 | 44.62 | +4.66 |
| Liberal hold | | Swing | −4.66 | |

=== Page ===
This section is an excerpt from Electoral results for the Division of Page § 2007

2007 Australian federal election: Page
| Party | Candidate | Votes | % | ±% |
|---|---|---|---|---|
| National | Chris Gulaptis | 36,813 | 43.05 | −6.68 |
| Labor | Janelle Saffin | 35,636 | 41.67 | +8.60 |
| Greens | Theo Jongen | 6,930 | 8.10 | −1.46 |
| Independent | Doug Behn | 1,525 | 1.78 | +0.40 |
| Christian Democrats | Rhonda Avasalu | 1,430 | 1.67 | +1.67 |
| Democrats | Julia Melland | 910 | 1.06 | +0.79 |
| Independent | Tony Kane | 877 | 1.03 | +1.03 |
| Family First | Mirian Vega | 784 | 0.92 | +0.76 |
| Liberty & Democracy | Ben Beatty | 462 | 0.54 | +0.54 |
| Citizens Electoral Council | John Culverwell | 143 | 0.17 | −0.78 |
| Total formal votes | | 85,510 | 95.70 | −0.22 |
| Informal votes | | 3,842 | 4.30 | +0.22 |
| Turnout | | 89,352 | 95.64 | −0.29 |
Two-party-preferred result
| Labor | Janelle Saffin | 44,770 | 52.36 | +7.83 |
| National | Chris Gulaptis | 40,740 | 47.64 | −7.83 |
| Labor gain from National | | Swing | +7.83 | |

=== Parkes ===
This section is an excerpt from Electoral results for the Division of Parkes § 2007

2007 Australian federal election: Parkes
| Party | Candidate | Votes | % | ±% |
|---|---|---|---|---|
| National | Mark Coulton | 38,574 | 46.77 | −15.02 |
| Labor | Margaret Patriarca | 20,922 | 25.37 | +0.72 |
| Independent | Tim Horan | 17,098 | 20.73 | +20.73 |
| Greens | Matt Parmeter | 2,496 | 3.03 | −1.24 |
| Independent | Bruce Haigh | 2,153 | 2.61 | −1.21 |
| Climate Change | Michael Kiely | 939 | 1.14 | +1.14 |
| Citizens Electoral Council | Richard Stringer | 287 | 0.35 | −0.75 |
| Total formal votes | | 82,469 | 95.80 | −0.55 |
| Informal votes | | 3,617 | 4.20 | +0.55 |
| Turnout | | 86,086 | 95.97 | −0.75 |
Two-party-preferred result
| National | Mark Coulton | 51,985 | 63.04 | −4.52 |
| Labor | Margaret Patriarca | 30,484 | 36.96 | +4.52 |
| National hold | | Swing | −4.52 | |

=== Parramatta ===
This section is an excerpt from Electoral results for the Division of Parramatta § 2007

2007 Australian federal election: Parramatta
| Party | Candidate | Votes | % | ±% |
|---|---|---|---|---|
| Labor | Julie Owens | 43,083 | 50.58 | +10.68 |
| Liberal | Colin Robinson | 32,155 | 37.75 | −7.39 |
| Greens | Astrid O'Neill | 4,288 | 5.03 | +0.16 |
| Christian Democrats | Sam Baissari | 2,403 | 2.82 | +0.00 |
| Socialist Alliance | Rachel Evans | 1,015 | 1.19 | +1.19 |
| Family First | Rene Hernandez | 888 | 1.04 | +0.09 |
| Independent | Brian Buckley | 639 | 0.75 | +0.75 |
| Liberty & Democracy | Graham Nickols | 274 | 0.32 | +0.32 |
| Socialist Equality | Chris Gordon | 261 | 0.31 | +0.31 |
| Communist League | Alasdair Macdonald | 174 | 0.20 | +0.20 |
| Total formal votes | | 85,180 | 93.44 | +2.69 |
| Informal votes | | 5,981 | 6.56 | −2.69 |
| Turnout | | 91,161 | 94.75 | −0.06 |
Two-party-preferred result
| Labor | Julie Owens | 48,453 | 56.88 | +7.71 |
| Liberal | Colin Robinson | 36,727 | 43.12 | −7.71 |
| Labor notional gain from Liberal | | Swing | +7.71 | |

The sitting member was Julie Owens (Labor) however a redistribution made it a notional Liberal seat with a margin of 1.1%.

=== Paterson ===
This section is an excerpt from Electoral results for the Division of Paterson § 2007

2007 Australian federal election: Paterson
| Party | Candidate | Votes | % | ±% |
|---|---|---|---|---|
| Liberal | Bob Baldwin | 40,466 | 48.22 | +1.72 |
| Labor | Jim Arneman | 35,291 | 42.06 | +5.76 |
| Greens | Judy Donnelly | 4,344 | 5.18 | +0.70 |
| Fishing Party | Paul Hennelly | 1,073 | 1.28 | +0.48 |
| Christian Democrats | Heather Haynes | 1,010 | 1.20 | +0.81 |
| One Nation | John Hamberger | 832 | 0.99 | −0.97 |
| Family First | Christopher Stokes | 559 | 0.67 | −0.25 |
| Citizens Electoral Council | Tony King | 341 | 0.41 | −0.89 |
| Total formal votes | | 83,916 | 96.43 | +2.24 |
| Informal votes | | 3,106 | 3.57 | −2.24 |
| Turnout | | 87,022 | 96.15 | +0.37 |
Two-party-preferred result
| Liberal | Bob Baldwin | 43,228 | 51.51 | −4.81 |
| Labor | Jim Arneman | 40,688 | 48.49 | +4.81 |
| Liberal hold | | Swing | −4.81 | |

=== Prospect ===
This section is an excerpt from Electoral results for the Division of Prospect § 2007

2007 Australian federal election: Prospect
| Party | Candidate | Votes | % | ±% |
|---|---|---|---|---|
| Labor | Chris Bowen | 46,135 | 58.18 | +9.11 |
| Liberal | Lily Arthur | 24,705 | 31.15 | −7.16 |
| Greens | Lizza Gebilagin | 3,618 | 4.56 | −0.61 |
| Family First | Carolyn Lever | 2,655 | 3.35 | +3.27 |
| Christian Democrats | Jason Callander | 2,187 | 2.76 | −0.55 |
| Total formal votes | | 79,300 | 92.27 | +1.68 |
| Informal votes | | 6,648 | 7.73 | −1.68 |
| Turnout | | 85,948 | 94.84 | +0.90 |
Two-party-preferred result
| Labor | Chris Bowen | 50,327 | 63.46 | +7.06 |
| Liberal | Lily Arthur | 28,973 | 36.54 | −7.06 |
| Labor hold | | Swing | +7.06 | |

=== Reid ===
This section is an excerpt from Electoral results for the Division of Reid § 2007

2007 Australian federal election: Reid
| Party | Candidate | Votes | % | ±% |
|---|---|---|---|---|
| Labor | Laurie Ferguson | 47,739 | 60.10 | +9.26 |
| Liberal | Ronney Oueik | 21,516 | 27.09 | −4.98 |
| Greens | Mark Lipscombe | 4,160 | 5.24 | −0.33 |
| Christian Democrats | Alex Sharah | 3,170 | 3.99 | +0.88 |
| Family First | Veronica Lambert | 1,301 | 1.64 | +1.42 |
| Democrats | Silma Ihram | 1,123 | 1.41 | +0.16 |
| Citizens Electoral Council | Hal Johnson | 429 | 0.54 | +0.54 |
| Total formal votes | | 79,438 | 92.43 | +3.77 |
| Informal votes | | 6,508 | 7.57 | −3.77 |
| Turnout | | 85,946 | 92.77 | +1.12 |
Two-party-preferred result
| Labor | Laurie Ferguson | 53,065 | 66.80 | +4.72 |
| Liberal | Ronney Oueik | 26,373 | 33.20 | −4.72 |
| Labor hold | | Swing | +4.72 | |

=== Richmond ===
This section is an excerpt from Electoral results for the Division of Richmond § 2007

2007 Australian federal election: Richmond
| Party | Candidate | Votes | % | ±% |
|---|---|---|---|---|
| Labor | Justine Elliot | 35,699 | 43.81 | +8.15 |
| National | Sue Page | 30,134 | 36.98 | −7.53 |
| Greens | Giovanni Ebono | 12,168 | 14.93 | +1.32 |
| Liberty & Democracy | Daniel Farmilo | 1,320 | 1.62 | +1.62 |
| Christian Democrats | Barbara Raymond | 1,039 | 1.28 | +1.28 |
| Democrats | Scott Sledge | 950 | 1.17 | +0.12 |
| Citizens Electoral Council | Graham McCallum | 176 | 0.22 | +0.16 |
| Total formal votes | | 81,486 | 95.72 | −0.62 |
| Informal votes | | 3,647 | 4.28 | +0.62 |
| Turnout | | 85,133 | 94.57 | +0.24 |
Two-party-preferred result
| Labor | Justine Elliot | 47,973 | 58.87 | +7.43 |
| National | Sue Page | 33,513 | 41.13 | −7.43 |
| Labor hold | | Swing | +7.43 | |

=== Riverina ===
This section is an excerpt from Electoral results for the Division of Riverina § 2007

2007 Australian federal election: Riverina
| Party | Candidate | Votes | % | ±% |
|---|---|---|---|---|
| National | Kay Hull | 52,779 | 62.57 | −4.47 |
| Labor | Peter Knox | 24,471 | 29.01 | +4.48 |
| Greens | Ray Goodlass | 4,130 | 4.90 | +0.58 |
| One Nation | Craig Hesketh | 1,837 | 2.18 | −1.77 |
| Citizens Electoral Council | Gary Johnson | 1,141 | 1.35 | +1.31 |
| Total formal votes | | 84,358 | 96.17 | −0.01 |
| Informal votes | | 3,361 | 3.83 | +0.01 |
| Turnout | | 87,719 | 96.01 | −0.31 |
Two-party-preferred result
| National | Kay Hull | 55,868 | 66.23 | −4.62 |
| Labor | Peter Knox | 28,490 | 33.77 | +4.62 |
| National hold | | Swing | −4.62 | |

=== Robertson ===
This section is an excerpt from Electoral results for the Division of Robertson § 2007

2007 Australian federal election: Robertson
| Party | Candidate | Votes | % | ±% |
|---|---|---|---|---|
| Liberal | Jim Lloyd | 39,792 | 45.63 | −7.83 |
| Labor | Belinda Neal | 37,437 | 42.93 | +8.29 |
| Greens | Mira Wroblewski | 6,279 | 7.20 | −0.65 |
| Christian Democrats | George Grant | 1,929 | 2.21 | +2.21 |
| One Nation | Helen Ryan | 924 | 1.06 | −0.66 |
| Family First | Daniel Le | 708 | 0.81 | −0.91 |
| Citizens Electoral Council | Nicholas Tomlin | 141 | 0.16 | −0.11 |
| Total formal votes | | 87,210 | 96.56 | +1.09 |
| Informal votes | | 3,109 | 3.44 | −1.09 |
| Turnout | | 90,319 | 95.74 | +0.11 |
Two-party-preferred result
| Labor | Belinda Neal | 43,697 | 50.11 | +6.98 |
| Liberal | Jim Lloyd | 43,513 | 49.89 | −6.98 |
| Labor gain from Liberal | | Swing | +6.98 | |

=== Shortland ===
This section is an excerpt from Electoral results for the Division of Shortland § 2007

2007 Australian federal election: Shortland
| Party | Candidate | Votes | % | ±% |
|---|---|---|---|---|
| Labor | Jill Hall | 48,525 | 56.73 | +7.40 |
| Liberal | Jon Kealy | 26,620 | 31.12 | −4.69 |
| Greens | Keith Parsons | 7,097 | 8.30 | +0.15 |
| Christian Democrats | Les Wallace | 1,655 | 1.93 | +1.93 |
| Family First | Matthew Reeves | 1,644 | 1.92 | −0.49 |
| Total formal votes | | 85,541 | 95.84 | +0.41 |
| Informal votes | | 3,714 | 4.16 | −0.41 |
| Turnout | | 89,255 | 95.78 | −0.46 |
Two-party-preferred result
| Labor | Jill Hall | 55,379 | 64.74 | +5.50 |
| Liberal | Jon Kealy | 30,162 | 35.26 | −5.50 |
| Labor hold | | Swing | +5.50 | |

=== Sydney ===
This section is an excerpt from Electoral results for the Division of Sydney § 2007

2007 Australian federal election: Sydney
| Party | Candidate | Votes | % | ±% |
|---|---|---|---|---|
| Labor | Tanya Plibersek | 37,506 | 48.99 | +3.92 |
| Liberal | Georgina Anderson | 20,440 | 26.70 | −0.81 |
| Greens | Jenny Leong | 15,854 | 20.71 | −1.38 |
| Independent | Jane Ward | 979 | 1.28 | −0.29 |
| Democrats | Mayo Materazzo | 874 | 1.14 | −1.00 |
| Christian Democrats | John Lee | 727 | 0.95 | +0.95 |
| Citizens Electoral Council | Adrian Ford | 184 | 0.24 | +0.06 |
| Total formal votes | | 76,564 | 95.88 | +1.09 |
| Informal votes | | 3,286 | 4.12 | −1.09 |
| Turnout | | 79,850 | 90.85 | +0.84 |
Two-party-preferred result
| Labor | Tanya Plibersek | 53,214 | 69.50 | +2.12 |
| Liberal | Georgina Anderson | 23,350 | 30.50 | −2.12 |
| Labor hold | | Swing | +2.12 | |

=== Throsby ===
This section is an excerpt from Electoral results for the Division of Throwsby § 2007

2007 Australian federal election: Throsby
| Party | Candidate | Votes | % | ±% |
|---|---|---|---|---|
| Labor | Jennie George | 52,275 | 64.98 | +9.97 |
| Liberal | Stuart Wright | 18,266 | 22.71 | −9.40 |
| Greens | Peter Moran | 7,308 | 9.08 | −0.97 |
| Christian Democrats | Scott Deakes | 2,598 | 3.23 | +2.97 |
| Total formal votes | | 80,447 | 94.76 | +0.20 |
| Informal votes | | 4,446 | 5.24 | −0.20 |
| Turnout | | 84,893 | 95.92 | +0.44 |
Two-party-preferred result
| Labor | Jennie George | 59,099 | 73.46 | +9.64 |
| Liberal | Stuart Wright | 21,348 | 26.54 | −9.64 |
| Labor hold | | Swing | +9.64 | |

=== Warringah ===
This section is an excerpt from Electoral results for the Division of Warringah § 2007

2007 Australian federal election: Warringah
| Party | Candidate | Votes | % | ±% |
|---|---|---|---|---|
| Liberal | Tony Abbott | 46,398 | 54.53 | −0.97 |
| Labor | Hugh Zochling | 23,317 | 27.40 | +2.29 |
| Greens | Conny Harris | 10,660 | 12.53 | +0.71 |
| Independent | Patricia Petersen | 1,529 | 1.80 | −0.50 |
| Democrats | Georgina Johanson | 1,095 | 1.29 | +1.04 |
| Christian Democrats | Bill McCudden | 1,020 | 1.20 | +1.20 |
| Climate Conservatives | Goronwy Price | 616 | 0.72 | +0.72 |
| Independent | Brett Middleton | 456 | 0.54 | −0.83 |
| Total formal votes | | 85,091 | 96.42 | +2.18 |
| Informal votes | | 3,162 | 3.58 | −2.18 |
| Turnout | | 88,253 | 93.63 | −0.17 |
Two-party-preferred result
| Liberal | Tony Abbott | 50,627 | 59.50 | −1.79 |
| Labor | Hugh Zochling | 34,464 | 40.50 | +1.79 |
| Liberal hold | | Swing | −1.79 | |

=== Watson ===
This section is an excerpt from Electoral results for the Division of Watson § 2007

2007 Australian federal election: Watson
| Party | Candidate | Votes | % | ±% |
|---|---|---|---|---|
| Labor | Tony Burke | 49,652 | 61.81 | +5.43 |
| Liberal | Philip Mansour | 20,957 | 26.09 | −5.54 |
| Greens | Christine Donayre | 5,302 | 6.60 | +0.22 |
| Family First | Merry Foy | 2,011 | 2.50 | +1.04 |
| Christian Democrats | Josephine Sammut | 1,988 | 2.47 | +1.89 |
| Communist League | Ronald Poulsen | 424 | 0.53 | +0.14 |
| Total formal votes | | 80,334 | 90.95 | +0.11 |
| Informal votes | | 7,997 | 9.05 | −0.11 |
| Turnout | | 88,331 | 93.31 | +0.44 |
Two-party-preferred result
| Labor | Tony Burke | 56,499 | 70.33 | +5.77 |
| Liberal | Philip Mansour | 23,835 | 29.67 | −5.77 |
| Labor hold | | Swing | +5.77 | |

=== Wentworth ===
This section is an excerpt from Electoral results for the Division of Wentworth § 2007

2007 Australian federal election: Wentworth
| Party | Candidate | Votes | % | ±% |
|---|---|---|---|---|
| Liberal | Malcolm Turnbull | 44,463 | 50.37 | +10.10 |
| Labor | George Newhouse | 26,903 | 30.48 | +1.55 |
| Greens | Susan Jarnason | 13,205 | 14.96 | +2.10 |
| Climate Change | Dixie Coulton | 1,156 | 1.31 | +1.31 |
| Independent | Dani Ecuyer | 774 | 0.88 | +0.88 |
| Democrats | Pierce Field | 721 | 0.82 | −0.28 |
| Christian Democrats | Bradley Molony | 323 | 0.37 | +0.37 |
| Independent | Pat Sheil | 265 | 0.30 | +0.06 |
| Family First | James Adams | 255 | 0.29 | −0.04 |
| Liberty & Democracy | Jonatan Kelu | 129 | 0.15 | +0.15 |
| Citizens Electoral Council | John Jamieson | 78 | 0.09 | −0.01 |
| Total formal votes | | 88,272 | 95.10 | +1.05 |
| Informal votes | | 4,548 | 4.90 | −1.05 |
| Turnout | | 92,820 | 92.56 | −0.54 |
Two-party-preferred result
| Liberal | Malcolm Turnbull | 47,538 | 53.85 | +1.34 |
| Labor | George Newhouse | 40,734 | 46.15 | −1.34 |
| Liberal hold | | Swing | +1.34 | |

=== Werriwa ===
This section is an excerpt from Electoral results for the Division of Werriwa § 2007

2007 Australian federal election: Werriwa
| Party | Candidate | Votes | % | ±% |
|---|---|---|---|---|
| Labor | Chris Hayes | 46,892 | 58.83 | +8.92 |
| Liberal | Rachel Elliott | 24,046 | 30.17 | −7.44 |
| Greens | Neerav Bhatt | 3,022 | 3.79 | +0.07 |
| Independent | Joe Bryant | 2,016 | 2.53 | +2.53 |
| Family First | Andrew Mills | 1,920 | 2.41 | +2.00 |
| Christian Democrats | Hany Gayed | 1,814 | 2.28 | +1.90 |
| Total formal votes | | 79,710 | 93.47 | +1.45 |
| Informal votes | | 5,569 | 6.53 | −1.45 |
| Turnout | | 85,279 | 94.43 | +1.10 |
Two-party-preferred result
| Labor | Chris Hayes | 51,999 | 65.24 | +8.30 |
| Liberal | Rachel Elliott | 27,711 | 34.76 | −8.30 |
| Labor hold | | Swing | +8.30 | |

== See also ==
- Members of the Australian House of Representatives, 2007–2010
