= Byron Shire Echo =

Australian weekly independent compact newspaper

The Byron Shire Echo

- The front page of The Byron Shire Echo; Volume 34, Number 51 – 27 May 2020
- Type: Weekly newspaper
- Format: Compact
- Owners: Shand family estate (majority owner – 43%); David Lovejoy (minority owner – 38%); Others (minority owners – 19%)
- Founder(s): Nicholas Shand; David Lovejoy
- Publisher: Echo Publications Pty Ltd
- Editor: Hans Lovejoy
- General manager: Simon Haslam
- Photo editor: Jeff Dawson
- Founded: 11 June 1986 (40 years ago)
- Political alignment: Progressivism
- Headquarters: 1/64 McGoughans Lane; Mullumbimby, New South Wales
- Country: Australia
- Circulation: 24,500 (as of 15 December 2021)
- Readership: 30,147
- OCLC number: 221390414
- Website: echo.net.au
- Free online archives: issuu.com

The Byron Shire Echo is a weekly independent compact newspaper published every Wednesday in Mullumbimby, New South Wales, Australia. The newspaper was founded in 1986 as The Brunswick Valley Echo by Nicholas Shand and David Lovejoy.

== Overview ==
The newspaper published its first issue on 11 June 1986 largely in response to marijuana raids made by the New South Wales Police Force in valleys surrounding Mullumbimby. Shand and Lovejoy founded the newspaper as a civil rights watchdog due to news media refusing to report on aggressive and illegal actions made by police.

In 1991, Shand, Lovejoy and photographer Jeff Dawson established the Lismore Echo which would later be sold to the employees of the newspaper and renamed the Northern Rivers Echo. The "Northern Rivers Echo" would change hands again with Australian Provincial Newspapers purchasing it in December 2008 and once more in 2016 when the newspaper was sold to News Corp Australia. before being totally closed by News Corp Australia in June 2020 A third newspaper named the Tweed Shire Echo began publication in August 2008, but ceased publication in 2012 as a result of low income. Echonetdaily was launched in August 2011 as an online newspaper covering news and events in the Northern Rivers region.

The newspaper's website, through Issuu; an electronic publishing platform, provides archived PDF versions of the newspaper dating back to 2005. A documentary of the newspaper titled The Echo Doco – Born To Be Trouble was released in 2011.

Since 2010, the newspaper has been edited by Hans Lovejoy. He is only the third editor in the newspaper's history, after founder Nicholas Shand and long-serving editor Michael McDonald. The general manager of the company is Simon Haslam, columnists of the newspaper include Mungo MacCallum and Mandy Nolan.
