= Mandy Nolan =

Australian political candidate, writer, performer, and actor

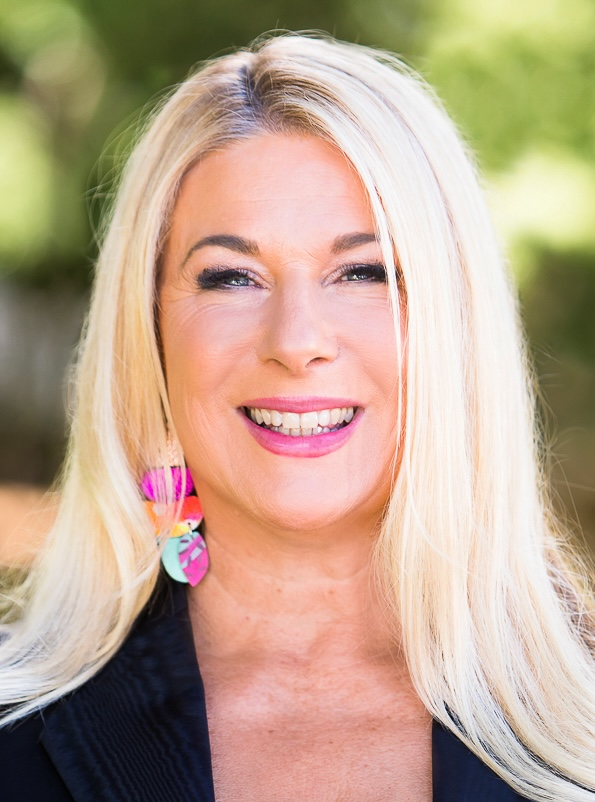
- Nolan in 2021

Personal details
- Born: 18 January 1967 (age 59) Wondai, Queensland, Australia
- Party: Greens
- Education: University of Queensland (BA)
- Occupation: Performer, comedian, MC, writer, author, artist, teacher, ambassador, activist

Amanda “Mandy” Nolan (born 18 January 1967) is an Australian comedian and writer. She was an unsuccessful candidate at the 2022 and 2025 Australian federal elections.

Nolan ran as the Greens candidate for the federal division of Richmond in the 2022 Federal Election, however she did not win the seat. Nolan was then announced as the Greens candidate for the same division again in May 2023, however would again lose to Labor incumbent Justine Elliot.

== Early life ==
Nolan was born on 18 January 1967 in Wondai, Queensland. Nolan attended Kingaroy State High School, graduating in 1984. She went on to complete a Bachelor of Arts at the University of Queensland, majoring in drama, literature and journalism, and trained as a vocational teacher of adults with learning disabilities.

During university, Nolan also gained experience part-time in the modelling industry.

== Career ==
=== Writer ===
Nolan has been the entertainment editor of the Byron Shire Echo since 2002, where she authors a column titled "Mandy Nolan's Soapbox", has been a contributor to the online publications Mamamia, The Hoopla, Lunchlady and ABC.

Nolan has published several books including The Full Mandy (2020), Boyfriends We've All Had (and Shouldn’t Have) (2014), Home Truths (2015) and What I Would Do If I Were You: Dispatches from the Frontlines of Family Life (2011), and also collaborated with Ellen Briggs to publish Women Like Us: Feeling Overwhelmed, Overworked, Overweight And Over It? (2018).

=== Comedian ===
Nolan's first comedy show was in 1985 at Queensland University, where she was involved in a university show. Nolan has also collaborated to create and tour shows with fellow comedians Ellen Briggs, Women Like Us, Akmal and Austen Tayshus, 2020 Vision, and with musician Áine Tyrrell, Country Witches Association. After the 2022 election, Nolan also created and performed the stand-up comedy show 'The Candidate'.

Nolan started The Byron Bay Comedy Festival in collaboration with Ellen Briggs and Glenn Wright, and was the Festival Director for The Big Joke comedy festival in Bangalow, NSW and a publicist for the Mullumbimby Music Festival.

==== Dementia Comedy Program ====
In 2007, Nolan was hired to work with carers of dementia patients, but ended up developing a program of improvised performance, role playing and theatre sports for people with dementia called Stand Up for Dementia.

Nolan facilitated the Stand Up for Dementia program across Australia and taught 20 new facilitators how to work with those with dementia, with the support of a federal government grant. The program resulted in an academic article, created by John Stevens, and international conference presentations on the results. The program was unable to continue without further government funding being provided.

Nolan advocated for humour therapy for people with dementia on TEDxByronBay with Stand up for Dementia in 2010 and SBS's Insight on the Dancing Dementia Episode in 2015. Nolan is also a supporter of the Dementia Inclusive Ballina, being the MC for the 2022 Dementia Update Luncheon and 2023 Symposium.

=== Teacher ===
Since 1997, Nolan has taught a stand-up comedy class at Byron Community College, having more than 1,500 graduating students, including Hannah Gadsby. Nolan has also facilitated stand-up comedy workshops such as Laugh Lines with Mandy Nolan at Byron Writers Festival and What if Jesus was married with Akmal Saleh. Nolan also coaches individuals in opinion writing workshops through her Write to the bone workshops and her Authentic You Masterclasses with George Catsi.

=== Podcaster ===
Nolan has been the host of various podcasts including Women Like Us - Mandy Nolan and Ellen Briggs, Authentic You's The Daily Dose Mamamia's The Split, and a guest on many more.

=== Artist ===
In her 20s and 30s, Nolan exhibited regularly to sold-out shows in Sydney and Byron Bay. In 2023, Nolan had a 'Made You Look, Made You Stare’ exhibition at Julian Edwards Fine Art Gallery.

== Political career ==
Nolan attended university during a very politicised time in Queensland, and would regularly attend anti–Joh Bjelke-Petersen rallies.

Nolan was first preselected to stand as the Greens candidate for the federal division of Richmond at the 2022 election against the Labor Party incumbent Justine Elliot. Nolan finished with 25.27 percent of the primary vote, a swing of 4.95 percent. Incumbent Justine Elliot won reelection.

Nolan was announced as the Greens candidate for the same division again in May 2023 and ran in the 2025 Australian federal election. Her campaign was formally launched on 21 March 2025 and, in April, it was announced that she would appear first on the ballot after a randomised ballot draw.

Labor incumbent Justine Elliot would win reelection in the 2025 election.

2025 Australian federal election: Richmond
Party	Candidate	Votes	%	±%
Labor	Justine Elliot	31,901	30.40	+1.60
Greens	Mandy Nolan	27,783	26.47	+1.20
National	Kimberly Hone	25,795	24.58	+1.23
One Nation	Ian Mye	5,709	5.44	+1.36
Legalise Cannabis	Vivian Mac McMahon	3,998	3.81	+3.81
People First	Richard Curtin	3,364	3.21	+3.21
Trumpet of Patriots	Phillip Peterkin	2,052	1.96	+1.96
Independent	Kevin Loughrey	1,754	1.67	+1.67
Libertarian	Ian Cherry Willis	1,619	1.54	−6.16
Independent	James Ian McKenzie	977	0.93	+0.93
Total formal votes		104,952	92.43	−0.65
Informal votes		8,600	7.57	+0.65
Turnout		113,552	89.54	+3.24
Two-party-preferred result
Labor	Justine Elliot	62,975	60.00	+1.77
National	Kimberly Hone	41,977	40.00	−1.77
Labor hold		Swing	+1.77	

Nolan was preselected as the Greens candidate for the state electorate of Ballina at the 2027 election, taking over from retiring incumbent Tamara Smith.

== Community and charity work ==
=== Environment ===
Nolan has been an ambassador and advocate of the following charities and causes:

- Bangalow Koalas
- Byron Bay Wildlife Hospital
- Borneo Orangutan Survival Foundation
- Human Nature

=== Health ===
Since 2021, Nolan has worked with Dr George Catsi, in collaboration with Northern NSW Local Health District, to create a podcast with the aim of reducing stigma in health care settings towards people who inject drugs (PWID), as a way of improving their wellbeing and treatment outcomes

Nolan is also an ambassador for Adolescent Mental Health Service, Human Nature.

In 2008, Nolan performed stand-up comedy show 'Shoot it From the Hip Replacement' for seniors week.

== Personal life ==
Nolan currently lives in Mullumbimby, in the Northern Rivers region of New South Wales. She has five children and is married to academic John Stevens.

== Books ==
- 2020: The Full Mandy by Mandy Nolan (ISBN 9780648780748)
- 2018: Women Like Us: Feeling Overwhelmed, Overworked, Overweight And Over It? by Ellen Briggs and Mandy Nolan (ISBN 9780648100836)
- 2015: Home Truths by Mandy Nolan (ISBN 9781925048377)
- 2014: Boyfriends We've All Had (and Shouldn’t Have) by Mandy Nolan (ISBN 1921462825)
- 2011: What I Would Do If I Were You: Dispatches from the Frontlines of Family Life (ISBN 9781925048131)
