= Larry Anthony =

Australian politician (born 1961)

The Honourable Larry Anthony AO

Minister for Children and Youth Affairs
- In office 26 November 2001 – 26 October 2004
- Succeeded by: Sussan Ley Parliamentary Secretary to the Minister for Family and Community Services (Children and Youth Affairs)

Member of the Australian Parliament for Richmond
- In office 2 March 1996 – 9 October 2004
- Preceded by: Neville Newell
- Succeeded by: Justine Elliot

Personal details
- Born: 17 December 1961 (age 64) Sydney, Australia
- Party: Nationals
- Relations: Doug Anthony (father); Larry Anthony (grandfather)
- Education: University of New South Wales
- Occupation: Businessman

Lawrence James Anthony AO (born 17 December 1961) is an Australian former politician. He was a National Party of Australia member of the Australian House of Representatives representing the Division of Richmond, New South Wales, from the March 1996 election until his defeat in the 2004 election. He held the seat that was previously held by his father, Doug Anthony, and his grandfather, Larry Anthony, senior. The Anthonys became the first three-generation dynasty in the history of the House of Representatives.

== Early life ==
Anthony was born in Sydney, New South Wales, and educated at Canberra Grammar School before attending university at the University of New South Wales, Sydney. He was a businessman and stockbroker before entering politics.

== Politics ==
Anthony first ran in Richmond in 1993, losing to Labor incumbent Neville Newell—the first time that a member of the Anthony family had lost an election. He sought a rematch in 1996, and defeated Newell as part of the Coalition's decisive win that year.

However, due to demographic changes over the previous two decades that made Richmond much more compact and urban, Anthony was never able to establish nearly as secure a hold on the seat as his father and grandfather possessed when they held it for 47 consecutive years from 1937 to 1984. He barely held onto his seat in 1998 (against Newell) and 2001, surviving both times on One Nation preferences. In 2004, he was defeated by Labor's Justine Elliot, being the only Coalition MP from a rural electorate to lose his seat and the first member of the Anthony family to be unseated at an election. On the seventh count, Elliot picked up a large flow of Green preferences, allowing her to defeat Anthony by 301 votes.

Anthony was Parliamentary Secretary to the Minister for Trade 1998–99, Minister for Community Services 1999–2001 and Minister for Children and Youth Affairs from 2001 to 2004.

Anthony became Federal President of the National Party in 2015 and announced his intention to retire in 2021

== Honours ==
- Gold Distinguished Service Medal, The Duke of Edinburgh's International Award – Australia (2017)
- Appointed as Officer of the Order of Australia for "distinguished service to the people and Parliament of Australia, to political institutions, to business, and youth leadership organisations".

== See also ==
- Anthony family

Parliament of Australia
Preceded by Neville Newell	Member for Richmond; 1996–2004	Succeeded by Justine Elliot
