= Hubert Lawrence Anthony =

Australian politician (1897–1957)

The Honourable Larry Anthony
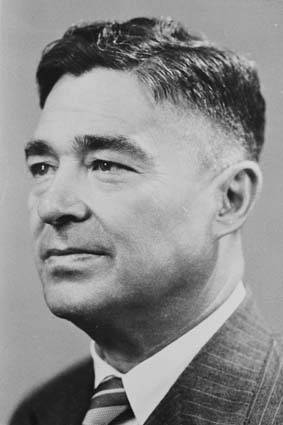
- Anthony in 1953

Minister for Civil Aviation
- In office 11 May 1951 – 9 July 1954
- Prime Minister: Robert Menzies
- Preceded by: Thomas White
- Succeeded by: Athol Townley

Postmaster-General of Australia
- In office 19 December 1949 – 11 January 1956
- Prime Minister: Robert Menzies
- Preceded by: Don Cameron
- Succeeded by: Charles Davidson

Minister for Transport
- In office 26 June 1941 – 7 October 1941
- Prime Minister: Robert Menzies; Arthur Fadden
- Preceded by: Position re-established
- Succeeded by: George Lawson

Member of the Australian Parliament for Richmond
- In office 23 October 1937 – 12 July 1957
- Preceded by: Roland Green
- Succeeded by: Doug Anthony

Personal details
- Born: 12 March 1897 Warren, New South Wales Colony, British Empire
- Died: 12 July 1957 (aged 60) Murwillumbah, New South Wales, Australia
- Party: Country
- Relations: Doug (son) Larry (grandson)
- Relatives: Anthony family
- Occupation: Farmer; Soldier; Politician

Military service
- Allegiance: Australia
- Branch/service: Australian Army
- Years of service: 1914–1916
- Rank: Sapper
- Unit: First Australian Imperial Force
- Commands: 2nd Signal Troop (Engineers)
- Battles/wars: World War I; Gallipoli campaign
- Service number: 521
- Active duty: 25 July – 10 August 1915
- Discharge reason: Medically unfit
- Awards: 1914–15 Star; British War Medal; Victory Medal

Hubert Lawrence "Larry" Anthony (12 March 1897 – 12 July 1957) was an Australian politician. He was a member of the Country Party and held ministerial office in the governments of Arthur Fadden and Robert Menzies, serving as Minister for Transport (1941), Postmaster-General (1949–1956), and Minister for Civil Aviation (1951–1954). A soldier and banana-grower before entering politics, he represented the New South Wales seat of Richmond from 1937 to 1957, which was later held by his son Doug Anthony and grandson Larry Anthony.

== Early life ==
Anthony was born on 12 March 1897 in Warren, New South Wales. He was the son of Honora Elizabeth (née McNab) and George Edward Anthony. His mother was born in Ireland and his father, who was working as a labourer at the time of his birth, was born in Australia.

Anthony attended the Warren Public School. He left school at the age of fourteen and joined the Postmaster-General's Department as a messenger boy. He later worked as a postal assistant in Peak Hill, New South Wales. In October 1914, Anthony enlisted in the Australian Imperial Force (AIF). He was assigned to the No. 2 Signal Troop of the Royal Australian Engineers and embarked for Egypt in December 1914. Anthony served on the Gallipoli campaign as a sapper and was present at the landing at Anzac Cove on 25 April 1915. A Bible he lost at Gallipoli was recovered by his commanding officer and returned to him in 1934. He was evacuated to England due to illness in August 1915, subsequently returning to Australia where he was discharged from the AIF in October 1916.

== Banana-growing ==
After leaving the military, Anthony moved to Sydney where he worked as a clerk and studied accounting and economics. In 1919 he took up a property near Tweed Heads, New South Wales, under a soldier settlement scheme and established a banana plantation. He served on the Tweed Shire Council from 1919 to 1922. His plantation's first crop failed due to banana bunchy top virus and they had to leave the property. A subsequent sugar-growing venture was also unsuccessful.

Anthony briefly worked as a land agent on what would become Queensland's Gold Coast, selling land at Burleigh Heads and Surfers Paradise on commission. Using his savings he returned to banana-growing, eventually becoming one of Australia's most successful producers. He helped establish the New South Wales Banana Growers' Federation in 1928 and was an advocate for research into bunchy top. By 1944 he reportedly had over 200 acres (81 ha) under cultivation.

== Politics ==
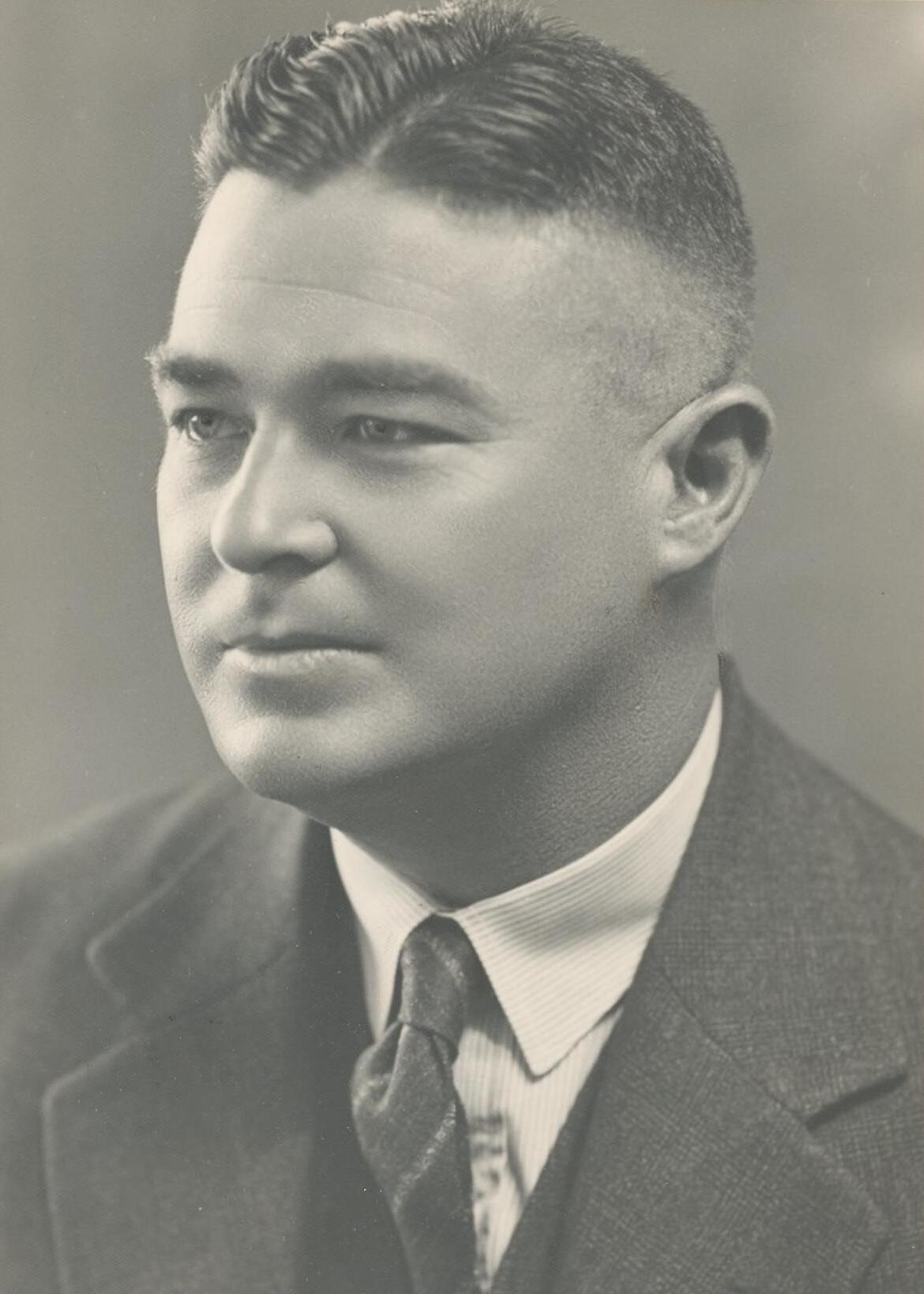
Anthony in 1938

In 1937 Anthony was elected to the House of Representatives as Country Party member for the seat of Richmond. He became a powerful figure in the party and advanced rapidly. He was an Honorary Minister 1940–1941, and Minister for Transport in 1941. During the years of the wartime Australian Labor Party government (1941–1949), he was a senior member of the Opposition.

In 1949 the conservatives returned to power under Robert Menzies, and Anthony became Postmaster-General, adding the post of Minister for Civil Aviation in 1951. He held these posts until his sudden death at Murwillumbah in 1957.

== Personal life ==
In 1921, Anthony married Mary Jessie Stirling. He was widowed in 1941 and in 1946 married Lyndall Marion Thornton (née Ingram), a widow. He had a daughter and two sons from his first marriage and another daughter from his second marriage.

Anthony's son John Douglas Anthony succeeded him in federal parliament upon his death and went on to serve as leader of the Country Party and deputy prime minister of Australia. Doug's son Lawrence James Anthony also held the seat of Richmond and was a government minister, becoming the first three-generation dynasty in the House of Representatives.

== See also ==
- Anthony family

Political offices
Preceded by New	Minister for Transport; 1941	Succeeded by George Lawson
Preceded by Don Cameron	Postmaster-General; 1949–1956	Succeeded by Charles Davidson
Preceded by Thomas White	Minister for Civil Aviation; 1951–1954	Succeeded by Athol Townley
Parliament of Australia
Preceded by Roland Green	Member for Richmond; 1937–1957	Succeeded by Doug Anthony
