= Sue Page =

Australian medical doctor (born 1960)

- Born: 1960 (age 65–66); Washington DC
- Occupation: Board member
- Employer: Future Health Leaders

Dr. Sue Page AM is an Australian medical professional with expertise in primary care, medical education, health workforce, service improvement and rural health services. As a past President of the Rural Doctors Association of Australia she has been influential in shaping Australian health policy and funding and has mentored and trained a variety of subsequent national leaders via positions as a Board member of Future Health Leaders, North Coast GP Training, RACGP Rural and the Australian Medicare Local Alliance. Page has held a variety of State and Federal Ministerial Advisory roles including for Mental Health, Drug & Alcohol, Medical Indemnity, Pharmacy Professional Programs, Medical Workforce, Medical Services and the NSW Commission of Audit. She has served on the NSW Health Care Advisory Committee and was the inaugural Chair of the North Coast Area Health Advisory Committee, reporting to the CEO and the State Health Minister for services from Port Macquarie to Tweed Heads in NSW. She has worked in several state jurisdictions, in public, private, Aged Care and Community Controlled sectors.

== Career ==
As Clinical Lead for Education for the RACGP, Dr Page headed a review of national curriculum and the move toward outcomes based learning with statements able to be uploaded onto smart phones. She assisted in the creation of the College's new Fellowship of Advanced Rural General Practice, the FARGP, which includes processes for Recognition of Prior Learning for rural GPs in established practice. She has championed the uptake of Telehealth in Australian community based practice with roles in the Government Department of Health and Ageing Telehealth Advisory Group, conference speaking engagements and contribution to RACGP Telehealth resources including a new Active Learning Module. Until 2010 she was the inaugural Director of the North Coast Medical Education Collaboration, a venture linking the University of Sydney, the University of Western Sydney and the University of Wollongong which established year-long training for medical students in rural areas and later combined with the UCRH.

A Rural Generalist in Obstetrics, Emergency Medicine and Mental Health, Page was a general surgery assistant at St Vincent’s Hospital in Lismore from 1992 to 2010 and GP-Obstetrician at Ballina Hospital from 1990 to 1998. In 2003 Page was appointed inaugural Chair of the North Coast Area Health Care Advisory Council within the NSW Department of Health, and following organisational restructure she returned as board member of the Northern NSW Local Health District from 2011 to 2016. Working for Bupa in Aged Care from 2014 to 2016, she later moved to Queensland as and Emergency Department (ED) Senior Medical Officer and later Director of Medical Services for Capricorn Coast Hospital and Health Service. She was Director of Clinical Training at Rockhampton Hospital in Central Queensland 2018, before her appointments as Director of Medical Services: in Bundaberg in 2019, Rockhampton in 2020, and for International SOS in 2021. Sue has worked as a locum in a variety of settings in central Queensland, remote Aboriginal communities in the Northern Territory, in Australian Border Force facilities Offshore and Maritime, and in Christmas Island, Manus Island and NT Immigration Detention Centres. She is currently a Senior Contracted Clinician working for Bup Health Services and a member of the Health Cyber Sharing Network Advisory Panel for CI-ISAC.

Identified as one of the top ten people in Australia influencing General Practice, Dr Page was recognised in the Australian Honours as a Member of the Order of Australia on Australia Day 25 January 2008. The award is recognition for outstanding achievement and service. Dr Page received her award for service to medicine and to the community through commitment to improving access to health and medical services in rural and remote areas, and through professional, educational and advisory roles.

Page has been instrumental in bringing cross-sector organisations together to work to common goals. Amongst achievements are listed contribution to resolving the 2003 Medical Indemnity crisis in Australia, the establishment of a dedicated training program for Procedural General Practice, and negotiating Australian Medicare Item Numbers for Nurses working within General Practices for procedures such as Pap smears and for Allied Health Professionals caring for patients with chronic and complex disease. She continues to promote collaborative working arrangements in Primary Health Care, and to inspire the next generation of health workforce through a variety of speaking engagements.

More recently, Page has held positions at Strategic Advisor for the National Disability Insurance Agency, as Regional Director of Medical Services for International SOS and for Wide Bay Hospital and Health Service at Bundaberg.During the pandemic she was appointed Covid Commander for Central Queensland Hospital and Health Service, establishing a Remote Patient Monitoring service linking remote communities, their GPs, the Hospital Sector, and Public Health Physicians and ultimately transforming patient access.She has remained a vocal advocate for public health initiatives including water fluoridation and vaccination and provides health opinion pieces and consultancy work via Medius Global. She sits on the Health Advisory Panel for CI-ISAC Australia.

== Early life and family ==
Now an Australian Citizen, Dr Page was born in Washington DC in 1960. She is the third child of Colonel David Page, Chief of Publicity and Psychological Warfare for the US First Army and later deputy chief administrator of the US Veterans Administration, and Diana Hodgkinson Page, one of the three first Australian women trained as Diplomatic Staff Cadets and later posted to New York as Vice Consul. Colonel Page was awarded the Croix De Guerre, US Legion of Merit and Bronze Star with V for Valor. He was a senior administrator in the US Treasury and US Department of Veterans' Affairs and in 1954 was appointed Executive Head of the President's Cabinet Committee.

Page attended the University of Newcastle where she later returned as the 2005 David Maddison Orator. In 1987 she married classmate Dr Chris Mitchell, the 2009–2010 President of the Royal Australian College of General Practice and equal advocate for health equity. They live on a farm in northern NSW with their three children, Robert Mitchell, Sara Mitchell, and Kate Mitchell.

== Politics ==
At the 2007 federal election, Page was the endorsed National Party candidate for the electorate of Richmond in northern New South Wales where she took a strong stance on environmental issues including nuclear power. She lost to incumbent Labor MP Justine Elliot.

== Ministerial appointments ==
- 2002–2003 NSW, General Practice Advisory Committee
- 2003 Commonwealth, Medical Indemnity Policy Review Panel I
- 2004 NSW, Clinical & Community Advisory Group
- 2005–2006 Commonwealth, Australian Medical Workforce Advisory Committee, Rural Expertise
- 2005–2006 Commonwealth, Medical Indemnity Policy Review Panel II
- 2002–2007 NSW, Mental Health Sentinel Events Review Committee (MHSERC): Chair, Suicide Sub-committee
- 2003–2007 NSW, Expert Advisory Group for Drug and Alcohol
- 2003–2007 NSW, Chair, North Coast Area Health Service Area Health Care Advisory Council
- 2004–2007 NSW, Rural Health Priority Taskforce
- 2005–2007 NSW, Health Care Advisory Committee
- 2004–2007 NSW, Board of Clinical Excellence Commission
- 2006–2007 Commonwealth, 4th Pharmacy Agreement Professional Programs & Services Advisory Committee
- 2011–2012 NSW, Member of Advisory Board, Commission of Audit

== Significant positions ==
- 2000–2004 ACRRM Representative for Far North NSW Coast
- 2002–2003 President, NSW Rural Doctors Association
- 2002–2003 Rural Doctors Network Representative to NSW Medical Board Assessment Panel for Overseas Trained Doctors
- 2002–2004 Member, NSW Rural Health Action Group
- 2003–2004 RDAA Representative on National Rural Health Alliance
- 2002–2005 RACGP Representative, NSW Aboriginal and Torres Strait Islander (ATSI) Maternal & Infant Health Committee
- 2003–2005 ACRRM Panel of Censors
- 2004–2006 Alliance of NSW Divisions (ANSWD) Rural Chapter Representative
- 2004–2006 President, Rural Doctors Association Australia
- 2005–2006 NSW Expert Advisory Committee for Paracetamol Use
- 2006 Acting Head of Department, Northern Rivers University Department of Rural Health
- 2006–2007 Past-President (Executive role), Rural Doctors Association Australia
- 2005–2007 RDAA Representative, National E-Health Transition Authority
- 2005–2007 Member, North Coast Australian Health Services Workforce Development Plan Implementation Steering Committee
- 2005–2007 Member, North Coast Area Health Services Learning and Development Committee
- 2007–2008 Member, Working Party: Abuse of Older Adults Prevention Project, Department of Veteran Affairs (DVA)
- 1990–2009 GP/Partner, Lennox Head Medical Centre
- 2004–2009 board member, Northern Rivers General Practice Network
- 2003–2010 Member, North Coast Cross-Sector Collaboration in Indigenous Health Committee
- 2004–2010 Member, Community Advisory Board, UNSW School of Public Health
- 2008–2010 VMO and Medical Advisory Committee member, Lismore Private Hospital
- 2003–2010 Director of Education, Northern Rivers University Department of Rural Health
- 2003–2010 North Coast Area Health Service workforce committee later Health Workforce Education Group
- 2009–2010 RACGP Representative, National Education Framework for Primary Maternity Services
- 2006–2010 Director, North Coast Medical Education Collaboration (University of Wollongong, University of Western Sydney, and the Sydney University)
- 2008–2012 RACGP Representative, NEHTA Medication Management Reference Group
- 2008–2012 RACGP Representative, Primary Care Committee, Australian Commission on Safety and Quality in HealthCare
- 2010–2012 RACGP Representative, TeleHealth Advisory Group, Medical Benefits Division, Commonwealth Department of Health and Ageing
- 2010–2012 RACGP Representative, NPS Medicines Line Advisory group
- 2011–2012 RACGP Representative, NPS Prescribing Competencies Project
- 2012–2015 board member, Australian Medical Local Alliance
- 2014–2016 Member, Medical Services Advisory Committee
- 2011–2016 board member, Northern NSW Local Health District
- 2011–current Member, RACGP Rural Education Committee
- 2011–current Member, RACGP National Standing Committee – Post Graduate Education
- 2011–current board member & Deputy Chair, RACGP Rural
- 2011–current board member, North Coast GP Training
- 2014-current board member, Future Health Leaders
- 2016-current board member RACGP NSW
