= Justine Elliot =

Australian politician

The Honourable Justine Elliot MP
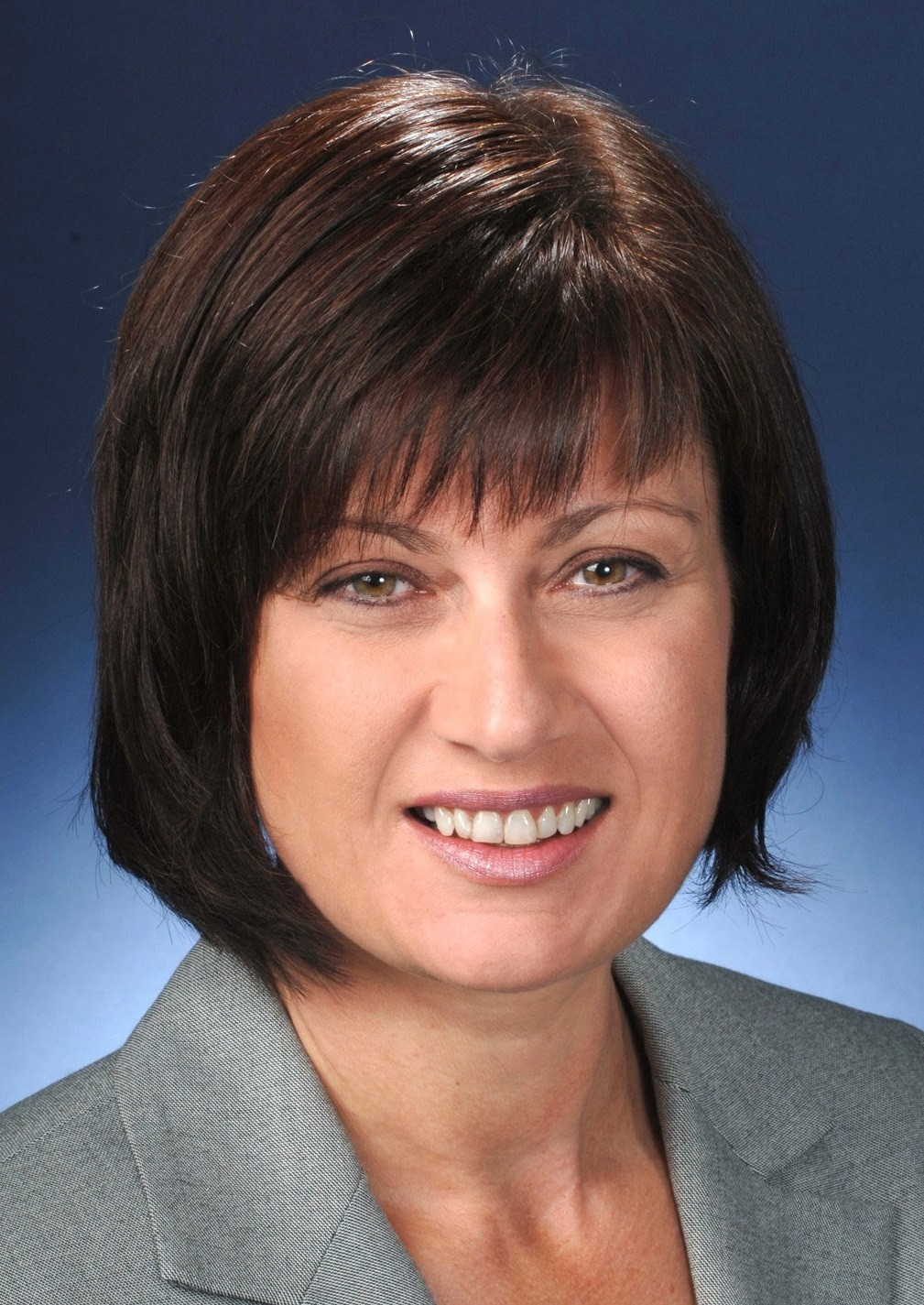

Assistant Minister for Social Services Assistant Minister for the Prevention of Family Violence
- In office 1 June 2022 – 13 May 2025
- Prime Minister: Anthony Albanese
- Minister: Amanda Rishworth
- Preceded by: Michelle Landry (as Minister for Children and Families)
- Succeeded by: Ged Kearney

Minister for Ageing
- In office 3 December 2007 – 28 June 2010
- Prime Minister: Kevin Rudd; Julia Gillard
- Preceded by: Christopher Pyne
- Succeeded by: Mark Butler

Parliamentary Secretary for Trade
- In office 14 September 2010 – 4 February 2013
- Prime Minister: Julia Gillard
- Minister: Stephen Smith (2010-2012); Craig Emerson (2012-2013)
- Preceded by: Anthony Byrne
- Succeeded by: Kelvin Thomson

Member of the Australian Parliament for Richmond
- Incumbent
- Assumed office 9 October 2004
- Preceded by: Larry Anthony

Personal details
- Born: Maria Justine Borsellino; 29 July 1967 (age 59) Brisbane, Queensland, Australia
- Party: Labor
- Education: University of Queensland
- Occupation: Police officer
- Website: www.justineelliot.com.au

Maria Justine Elliot (née Borsellino; born 29 July 1967) is an Australian politician. She is a member of the Australian Labor Party (ALP) and has served in the House of Representatives since the 2004 federal election, representing the New South Wales seat of Richmond. She served as Minister for Ageing in the First Rudd government from 2007 to 2010 and as a parliamentary secretary in the Gillard government from 2010 to 2013.

== Early life ==
Elliot was born on 29 July 1967 in Brisbane, Queensland. Her father Bob Borsellino (d. 2011) was a journalist and political activist who led efforts for an inquiry into the killing of the Balibo Five. He was a candidate for the Democrats and Greens at several state and federal elections. Her grandfathers were both World War II veterans, Joe Borsellino with the United States Marines and Victor Perkins with the Australian Army.

Elliot attended Nambour State High School, graduating in 1984. She went on to complete a Bachelor of Arts at the University of Queensland, majoring in English and history, and a graduate diploma in human resource management and industrial relations at Griffith University. Elliot was an officer with the Queensland Police from 1990 to 1997. She subsequently moved to Northern New South Wales and worked at the Department of Juvenile Justice from 2002 to 2003.

== Political career ==
Elliot joined the ALP in 1995 and served as president of its Tweed Coast branch from 2003 to 2004.

=== Opposition (2004–2007) ===
In a considerable upset at the 2004 election, Elliot defeated the National Party's Larry Anthony, a minister in the Howard government. Elliot's win was one of the few victories for the Labor Party as the Coalition easily won a fourth term in government. She was only the second Labor member ever to win the seat, and was also the only Labor challenger to defeat a Coalition MP in a rural seat. Richmond had been in the hands of a conservative party for all but six years since Federation, and for 66 of those years by the National Party. For much of that time, it had been a reasonably safe National seat. However, the growth of Tweed Heads and other coastal communities, as well as the concurrent loss of its more rural territory, has seen it become an increasingly urban seat since the 1980s. Elliot trailed Anthony by 11 points on the first count and was well behind him for most of the night. However, on the seventh count, a Green candidate's preferences flowed overwhelmingly to Elliot, allowing her to defeat Anthony by 301 votes.

Elliot served on the House of Representatives Standing Committee on Health and Ageing from 2004 to 2007. The 2007 election saw Elliot re-elected over the Nationals' Sue Page. She picked up a swing of over 7.4 points, which was significantly larger than the New South Wales state average.

=== Government (2007–2013) ===
Prime Minister Kevin Rudd announced Elliott would be part of his new ministry on 29 November 2007, as Minister for Ageing. She retained the seat at the 2010 election with only a small swing against Labor. She stepped aside as Minister for Ageing ahead of the formation of the Second Gillard Ministry on 11 September 2010. On 11 September 2010 Elliot was appointed as Parliamentary Secretary for Foreign Affairs and Trade, and held this position until a reconfiguration of the ministry on 4 February 2013 when she became a backbencher. She publicly announced that this was because of her opposition to coal-seam gas mining (CSG) in the electorate, which conflicted with the role of parliamentary secretary.

=== Opposition (2013–2022) ===
Elliot retained Richmond for Labor at the 2013 election even as the Coalition opposition defeated the incumbent Labor government, marking only the second time (the first being her initial victory in 2004) that the non-Labor parties had been in government without holding Richmond. She again won with an increased majority at the 2016 election and then increased her majority again at the 2019 election.

Elliot served on the Joint Statutory Law Enforcement Committee in 2013 and 2014, and the Joint Standing Treaties Committee in 2013. She also served on the three House of Representatives Standing Committees of Regional Australia, Publications and Petitions from 2013 to 2016. Elliot has been the Chair of the Federal Labor Country Caucus since 2014, and was the Deputy Chair of the Standing Committee on Petitions from 2013 to 2016, and again since 2019. She has also served on the Australian Commission for Law Enforcement Integrity since 2016, and the Law Enforcement Committee since 2019.

=== Government (2022–present) ===
Elliot retained Richmond at the 2022 election with a decrease of 2.91 percent in the primary vote, and two-party swing of 4.15%. She was subsequently named Assistant Minister for Social Services and Assistant Minister for the Prevention of Family Violence.

In the 2025 Australian federal election, Elliot was re-elected.

== Personal life ==
Elliot has two children with her husband Craig Elliot, who is also a former police officer. As of 2018 they lived in the rural locality of Nunderi. Her husband was the ALP's candidate in Tweed at the 2019 and 2023 New South Wales state election.

== See also ==
- First Rudd Ministry
- First Gillard Ministry

Political offices
Preceded by Christopher Pyne	Minister for Ageing; 2007–2010	Succeeded by Mark Butler
Parliament of Australia
Preceded by Larry Anthony	Member for Richmond; 2004–present	Incumbent
