= Results of the 2001 Australian federal election in New South Wales =

2001 Australian federal election (New South Wales)
← 1998	10 November 2001	2004 →

All 50 New South Wales seats in the Australian House of Representatives and 6 seats in the Australian Senate
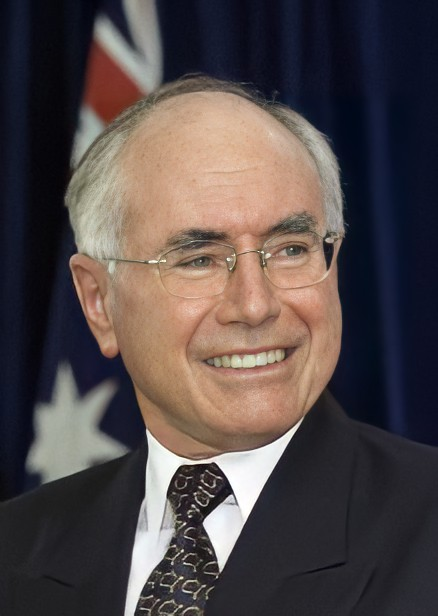

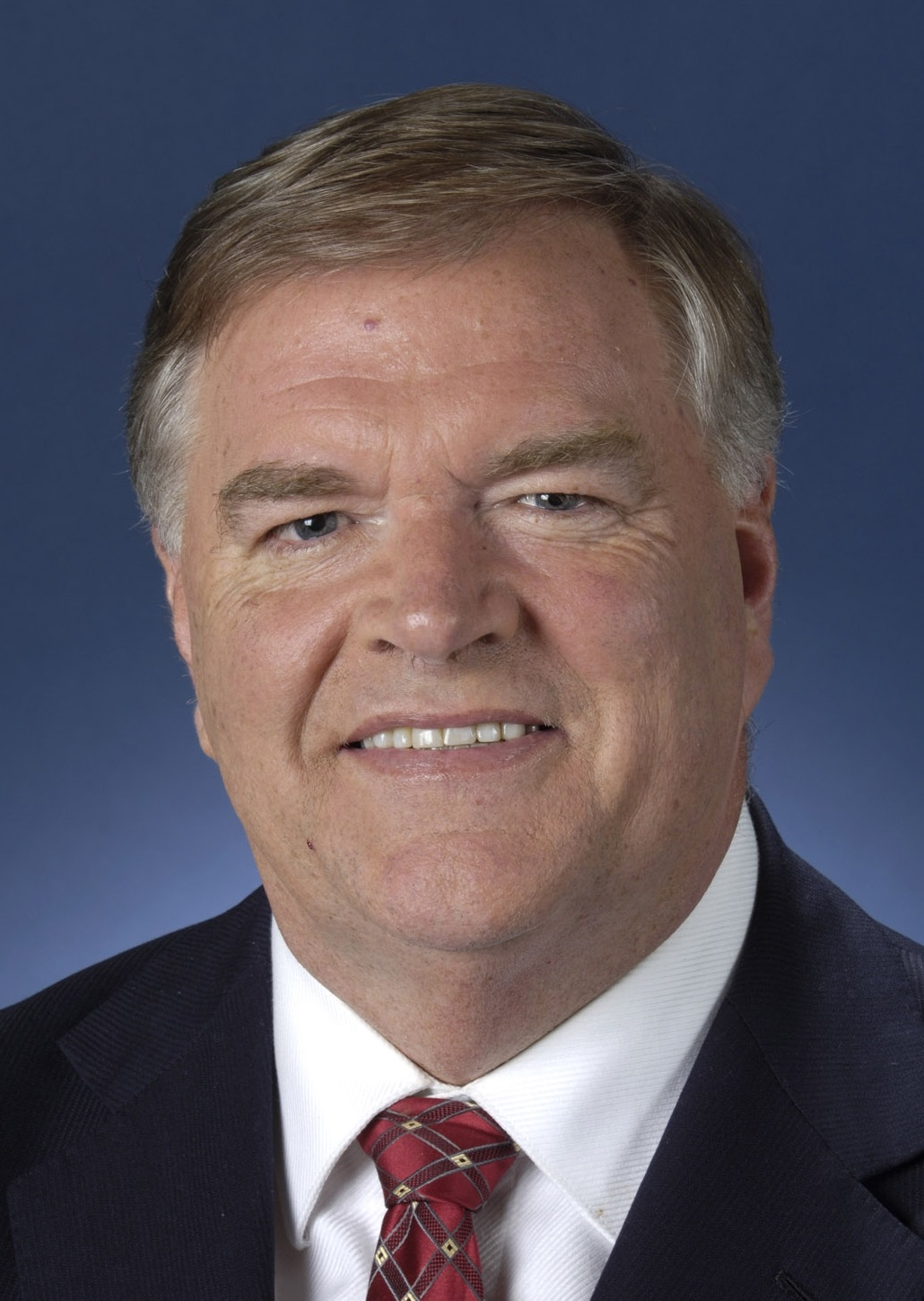
	First party	Second party
Leader	John Howard	Kim Beazley
Party	Liberal/National coalition	Labor
Last election	27 seats	22 seats
Seats won	28 seats	20 seats
Seat change	▲1	▼2
Popular vote	1,621,580	1,380,822
Percentage	42.80%	36.45%
Swing	▲4.41	▼3.67
TPP	52.14%	47.86%
TPP swing	▲3.68	▼3.68

This is a list of electoral division results for the Australian 2001 federal election in the state of New South Wales.

This election was held using instant-runoff voting. At this election, there was one "turn-over" in New South Wales. The Nationals won the seat of Cowper despite Labor finishing first, due to both the Liberals and the Nationals fielding candidates.

== Overall results ==
Turnout 99.60% (CV) — Informal 3.40%
Party	Votes	%	Swing	Seats	Change
Liberal	1,272,208	33.58	3.09	21	▲3
National	349,372	9.22	1.32	7	▼2
Liberal/National Coalition	1,621,580	42.80	4.41	28	▲1
Labor	1,380,822	36.45	–3.67	20	▼2
One Nation	180,812	4.77	–4.19		
Greens	180,079	4.75	2.09		
Democrats	160,706	4.24	0.08		
Independent	148,042	3.91	3.02	2	▲1
Christian Democrats	46,059	1.22	0.19		
Unity	24,653	0.65	–0.90		
Against Further Immigration	12,033	0.32			
Save the ADI Site	6,029	0.16			
Citizens Electoral Council	5,746	0.15			
No GST	4,858	0.13			
Progressive Labour	4,467	0.12			
Lower Excise Fuel	3,098	0.08			
HEMP	2,193	0.06			
Non-Custodial Parents	0,769	0.02			
Fishing Party	0,720	0.02			
Total	3,788,459			50	
Two-party-preferred vote
Liberal/National Coalition	1,811,019	52.14	+3.68	28	▲1
Labor	1,662,190	48.46	–3.68	20	▼2
Invalid/blank votes	217,024	5.42	+1.41		
Turnout	4,005,483	95.27			
Registered voters	4,204,383				
Source: AEC Tally Room

== Results by division ==
=== Banks ===
This section is an excerpt from Electoral results for the Division of Banks § 2001

2001 Australian federal election: Banks
Party	Candidate	Votes	%	±%
Labor	Daryl Melham	32,592	44.25	−0.34
Liberal	Marcus Watzlaff	26,358	35.79	+1.79
One Nation	Lynn Abrahams	4,649	6.31	−4.46
Against Further Immigration	Ken O'Leary	2,522	3.42	+3.42
Democrats	Stephen Cole	2,350	3.19	−1.06
Greens	David Wilcox	2,066	2.81	+1.32
Christian Democrats	Sam Baissari	1,968	2.67	+0.72
Unity	Lynne Murphy	731	0.99	−2.15
Independent	Nazim Hannoun	418	0.57	+0.57
Total formal votes		73,654	93.18	−2.89
Informal votes		5,393	6.82	+2.89
Turnout		79,047	95.48	
Two-party-preferred result
Labor	Daryl Melham	38,952	52.88	−4.37
Liberal	Marcus Watzlaff	34,702	47.12	+4.37
Labor hold		Swing	−4.37	

=== Barton ===
This section is an excerpt from Electoral results for the Division of Barton § 2001

2001 Australian federal election: Barton
Party	Candidate	Votes	%	±%
Labor	Robert McClelland	35,871	47.99	−1.71
Liberal	Jan Brennan	28,198	37.73	+2.76
Democrats	Michele Adair	3,328	4.45	+1.74
One Nation	David Rydstrand	2,725	3.65	−3.18
Greens	Chris Harris	2,168	2.90	+1.35
Unity	John Lau	1,375	1.84	−2.40
Christian Democrats	David Barker	1,081	1.45	+1.43
Total formal votes		74,746	93.41	−2.30
Informal votes		5,277	6.59	+2.30
Turnout		80,023	94.89	
Two-party-preferred result
Labor	Robert McClelland	41,873	56.02	−3.77
Liberal	Jan Brennan	32,873	43.98	+3.77
Labor hold		Swing	−3.77	

=== Bennelong ===
This section is an excerpt from Electoral results for the Division of Bennelong § 2001

2001 Australian federal election: Bennelong
Party	Candidate	Votes	%	±%
Liberal	John Howard	41,255	53.07	+4.30
Labor	Nicole Campbell	24,053	30.94	−1.42
Democrats	Peter Goldfinch	4,415	5.68	+0.98
Greens	Jimmy Shaw	3,133	4.03	+1.05
One Nation	Robert Webeck	2,126	2.73	−1.56
Independent	May Law	1,474	1.90	+1.90
No GST	Bruce Harkness	535	0.69	+0.47
Independent	John Dawson	458	0.59	+0.38
Save the ADI Site	Noel Plumb	205	0.26	+0.26
Non-Custodial Parents	Peter Marsh	84	0.11	+0.11
Total formal votes		77,738	94.58	+0.02
Informal votes		4,457	5.42	−0.02
Turnout		82,195	94.84	
Two-party-preferred result
Liberal	John Howard	44,861	57.70	+2.47
Labor	Nicole Campbell	32,877	42.30	−2.47
Liberal hold		Swing	+2.47	

=== Berowra ===
This section is an excerpt from Electoral results for the Division of Berowra § 2001

2001 Australian federal election: Berowra
Party	Candidate	Votes	%	±%
Liberal	Philip Ruddock	45,575	58.57	+4.10
Labor	Richard Slater	17,748	22.81	−3.94
Democrats	Philip Sparks	5,047	6.49	−0.04
Greens	Maureen Gale	4,029	5.18	+1.98
Christian Democrats	Owen Nannelli	1,632	2.10	−0.25
One Nation	Harry Ball	1,537	1.98	−4.37
Unity	Daniel Choi	1,124	1.44	+1.11
No GST	P J Gallagher	1,117	1.44	+1.44
Total formal votes		77,809	95.64	−1.28
Informal votes		3,544	4.36	+1.28
Turnout		81,353	95.18	
Two-party-preferred result
Liberal	Philip Ruddock	51,078	65.65	+2.28
Labor	Richard Slater	26,731	34.35	−2.28
Liberal hold		Swing	+2.28	

=== Blaxland ===
This section is an excerpt from Electoral results for the Division of Blaxland § 2001

2001 Australian federal election: Blaxland
Party	Candidate	Votes	%	±%
Labor	Michael Hatton	37,956	54.13	−6.40
Liberal	Les Osmond	18.170	25.91	+3.78
One Nation	Bob Vinnicombe	4,248	6.06	−0.94
Democrats	Colin McDermott	3,461	4.94	+2.53
Greens	Sonya McKay	1,839	2.62	+1.07
Christian Democrats	Janne Peterson	1,535	2.19	−0.03
Unity	Dario Hawat	1,493	2.13	−1.35
Independent	Peter Sayegh	975	1.39	+1.39
Independent	Munther Anny	443	0.63	+0.63
Total formal votes		70,120	90.22	−4.26
Informal votes		7,605	9.78	+4.26
Turnout		77,725	94.49	
Two-party-preferred result
Labor	Michael Hatton	45,725	65.21	−6.50
Liberal	Les Osmond	24,395	34.79	+6.50
Labor hold		Swing	−6.50	

=== Bradfield ===
This section is an excerpt from Electoral results for the Division of Bradfield § 2001

2001 Australian federal election: Bradfield
Party	Candidate	Votes	%	±%
Liberal	Brendan Nelson	52,628	64.60	+2.00
Labor	Kathie Blunt	15,489	19.01	−1.01
Greens	David Bell	5,451	6.69	+3.56
Democrats	Peter Byrne	5,443	6.68	−0.99
One Nation	John Webeck	1,247	1.53	−2.05
Christian Democrats	Witold Wiszniewski	1,204	1.48	−0.04
Total formal votes		81,462	96.24	−0.81
Informal votes		3,179	3.76	+0.81
Turnout		84,641	94.46	
Two-party-preferred result
Liberal	Brendan Nelson	57,969	71.16	−0.13
Labor	Kathie Blunt	23,493	28.84	+0.13
Liberal hold		Swing	−0.13	

=== Calare ===
This section is an excerpt from Electoral results for the Division of Calare § 2001

2001 Australian federal election: Calare
Party	Candidate	Votes	%	±%
Independent	Peter Andren	40,786	51.40	+15.12
Labor	Kath Knowles	16,314	20.56	−4.00
National	Dave Shearing	16,289	20.53	+8.58
One Nation	Terry Nixon	3,249	4.09	−6.95
Greens	Ian Watts	1,217	1.53	+0.43
Democrats	Don Marshall	1,191	1.50	+0.51
Citizens Electoral Council	David Simpson	311	0.39	+0.17
Total formal votes		79,357	96.72	+0.24
Informal votes		2,690	3.28	−0.24
Turnout		82,047	96.99	
Notional two-party-preferred count
National	Dave Shearing	41,055	51.73	−2.74
Labor	Kath Knowles	38,302	48.27	+2.74
Two-candidate-preferred result
Independent	Peter Andren	59,548	75.04	+2.73
National	Dave Shearing	19,809	24.96	+24.96
Independent hold		Swing	+2.73	

=== Charlton ===
This section is an excerpt from Electoral results for the Division of Charlton § 2001

2001 Australian federal election: Charlton
Party	Candidate	Votes	%	±%
Labor	Kelly Hoare	35,079	46.06	−2.53
Liberal	Lindsay Paterson	25,371	33.31	+5.07
One Nation	Bob Johnson	5,884	7.73	−4.28
Democrats	Joshua Bell	3,865	5.07	+0.44
Greens	David Blyth	3,765	4.94	+1.63
Christian Democrats	Jim Kendall	1,859	2.44	−0.62
Unity	John Thorpe	339	0.45	+0.45
Total formal votes		76,162	95.43	−1.58
Informal votes		3,651	4.57	+1.58
Turnout		79,813	96.04	
Two-party-preferred result
Labor	Kelly Hoare	43,151	56.66	−5.54
Liberal	Lindsay Paterson	33,011	43.34	+5.54
Labor hold		Swing	−5.54	

=== Chifley ===
This section is an excerpt from Electoral results for the Division of Chifley § 2001

2001 Australian federal election: Chifley
Party	Candidate	Votes	%	±%
Labor	Roger Price	40,203	56.30	−3.48
Liberal	Costa Asarloglou	18,225	25.52	+6.53
One Nation	Joe Damjanovic	4,442	6.22	−4.07
Save the ADI Site	Barbie Bates	2,347	3.29	+3.29
Christian Democrats	Joseph Wyness	1,784	2.50	+0.19
Democrats	S J Clack	1,365	1.91	−2.63
Against Further Immigration	Lindsey Butler	1,262	1.77	+1.77
Greens	David Cunningham	1,220	1.71	+0.25
Independent	Wayne Hyland	565	0.79	+0.79
Total formal votes		71,413	90.80	−3.14
Informal votes		7,232	9.20	+3.14
Turnout		78,645	94.93	
Two-party-preferred result
Labor	Roger Price	46,628	65.29	−5.98
Liberal	Costa Asarloglou	24,785	34.71	+5.98
Labor hold		Swing	−5.98	

=== Cook ===
This section is an excerpt from Electoral results for the Division of Cook § 2001

2001 Australian federal election: Cook
Party	Candidate	Votes	%	±%
Liberal	Bruce Baird	41,959	56.22	+6.14
Labor	Peri Young	19,768	26.49	−4.60
One Nation	Andy Frew	4,453	5.97	−2.36
Democrats	Alison Bailey	2,815	3.77	−0.50
Greens	Cathy Peters-Power	2,655	3.56	+1.38
Christian Democrats	Malcolm Smith	1,256	1.68	+0.43
Against Further Immigration	Peter James	852	1.14	+1.14
Independent	Patricia Poulos	453	0.61	+0.61
Independent	Graeme Strang	423	0.57	+0.57
Total formal votes		74,634	95.35	−0.62
Informal votes		3,640	4.65	+0.62
Turnout		78,274	96.06	
Two-party-preferred result
Liberal	Bruce Baird	47,768	64.00	+4.63
Labor	Peri Young	26,866	36.00	−4.63
Liberal hold		Swing	+4.63	

=== Cowper ===
This section is an excerpt from Electoral results for the Division of Cowper § 2001

2001 Australian federal election: Cowper
Party	Candidate	Votes	%	±%
Labor	Jenny Bonfield	23,615	32.31	−1.90
National	Luke Hartsuyker	21,846	29.89	−11.87
Liberal	Philip Neuss	11,663	15.95	+15.95
One Nation	Allan Stokes	5,164	7.06	−7.18
Greens	Jillian Cranny	4,033	5.52	+1.48
Democrats	Michael Fenton	1,978	2.71	−0.71
Lower Excise Fuel	John Maguire	1,904	2.60	+2.60
Christian Democrats	Bruce Korn	1,472	2.01	+1.79
Independent	John Willey	973	1.33	+1.33
Independent	Paul van Bladel	452	0.62	+0.62
Total formal votes		73,100	95.89	−1.34
Informal votes		3,131	4.11	+1.34
Turnout		76,231	96.05	
Two-party-preferred result
National	Luke Hartsuyker	40,006	54.73	−0.98
Labor	Jenny Bonfield	33,094	45.27	+0.98
National hold		Swing	−0.98	

=== Cunningham ===
This section is an excerpt from Electoral results for the Division of Cunningham § 2001

2001 Australian federal election: Cunningham
Party	Candidate	Votes	%	±%
Labor	Stephen Martin	32,722	44.19	−8.13
Liberal	Jeremy Fields	20,760	28.04	+2.97
Democrats	Michael Newman	5,307	7.17	+1.44
Greens	Carol Berry	4,914	6.64	+2.22
Independent	Trevor Mott	4,235	5.72	+5.72
One Nation	John Curtis	3,425	4.63	−3.11
Christian Democrats	Paul Skinner	1,841	2.49	+0.17
No GST	J Edwin Pink	840	1.13	+1.13
Total formal votes		74,044	95.16	−1.39
Informal votes		3,763	4.84	+1.39
Turnout		77,807	95.81	
Two-party-preferred result
Labor	Stephen Martin	44,904	60.65	−7.12
Liberal	Jeremy Fields	29,140	39.35	+7.12
Labor hold		Swing	−7.12	

=== Dobell ===
This section is an excerpt from Electoral results for the Division of Dobell § 2001

2001 Australian federal election: Dobell
Party	Candidate	Votes	%	±%
Liberal	Ken Ticehurst	32,761	43.93	+5.51
Labor	Michael Lee	31,824	42.68	−1.94
One Nation	Ron Falconer	3,223	4.32	−5.05
Democrats	Carolyn Hastie	3,142	4.21	+0.79
Greens	Samantha Ker	2,200	2.95	+0.80
Christian Democrats	Luke Hennig	1,420	1.90	−0.12
Total formal votes		74,570	95.74	−1.22
Informal votes		3,318	4.26	+1.22
Turnout		77,888	95.61	
Two-party-preferred result
Liberal	Ken Ticehurst	37,565	50.38	+1.91
Labor	Michael Lee	37,005	49.62	−1.91
Liberal gain from Labor		Swing	+1.91	

=== Eden-Monaro ===
This section is an excerpt from Electoral results for the Division of Eden-Monaro § 2001

2001 Australian federal election: Eden-Monaro
Party	Candidate	Votes	%	±%
Liberal	Gary Nairn	32,247	41.08	−2.16
Labor	Steve Whan	28,842	36.74	−2.32
Independent	Peter Cochran	6,436	8.20	+8.20
Greens	Rosemary Beaumont	3,911	4.98	+1.80
One Nation	Barry Bridges	2,821	3.59	−5.97
Democrats	Linda Chapman	2,584	3.29	−1.32
Christian Democrats	Frank Phillips	1,032	1.31	+1.31
Independent	Steve Urquhart	319	0.41	+0.41
Independent	Matthew Swift	211	0.27	+0.27
Non-Custodial Parents	Peter Vlug	94	0.12	+0.12
Total formal votes		78,497	95.58	−1.21
Informal votes		3,628	4.42	+1.21
Turnout		82,125	96.18	
Two-party-preferred result
Liberal	Gary Nairn	40,579	51.69	+1.07
Labor	Steve Whan	37,918	48.31	−1.07
Liberal hold		Swing	+1.07	

=== Farrer ===
This section is an excerpt from Electoral results for the Division of Farrer § 2001

2001 Australian federal election: Farrer
Party	Candidate	Votes	%	±%
Liberal	Sussan Ley	28,449	37.66	+33.30
National	Bill Bott	17,641	23.36	−24.73
Labor	Frank Millen	15,830	20.96	−3.79
One Nation	Max Wilkinson	4,795	6.35	−7.61
Greens	Chris Sobey	2,583	3.42	+3.23
Democrats	Brett Paterson	1,959	2.59	−1.42
Independent	Sue Taylor	1,254	1.66	+1.66
Independent	Stuart Watson	1,068	1.41	+1.41
	Keith Kreutzberger	696	0.92	+0.92
Independent	Tom Weyrich	485	0.64	+0.64
Independent	Andrew Gibson	416	0.55	+0.55
Independent	David Corbett	356	0.47	+0.47
Total formal votes		75,532	93.61	−2.37
Informal votes		5,156	6.39	+2.37
Turnout		80,688	96.04	
Two-party-preferred result
Liberal	Sussan Ley	37,869	50.14	+50.14
National	Bill Bott	37,663	49.86	−14.76
Liberal gain from National		Swing	+50.14	

=== Fowler ===
This section is an excerpt from Electoral results for the Division of Fowler § 2001

2001 Australian federal election: Fowler
Party	Candidate	Votes	%	±%
Labor	Julia Irwin	40,904	60.70	−1.61
Liberal	Glenn Watson	12,154	18.04	+1.83
Unity	Steve Chung	3,476	5.16	−5.81
One Nation	Oscar Rosso	2,357	3.50	−3.70
Citizens Electoral Council	Hal Johnson	2,166	3.21	+3.21
Greens	Lee Grant	1,654	2.45	+2.35
No GST	Robin Gaskell	1,395	2.07	+2.07
Democrats	David Mendelssohn	1,320	1.96	−1.22
Christian Democrats	Manny Poularas	1,110	1.65	+1.65
Against Further Immigration	Max Brazenall	853	1.27	+1.27
Total formal votes		67,389	87.29	−6.92
Informal votes		9,816	12.71	+6.92
Turnout		77,205	93.74	
Two-party-preferred result
Labor	Julia Irwin	48,174	71.50	−4.49
Liberal	Glenn Watson	19,215	28.50	+4.49
Labor hold		Swing	−4.49	

=== Gilmore ===
This section is an excerpt from Electoral results for the Division of Gilmore § 2001

2001 Australian federal election: Gilmore
Party	Candidate	Votes	%	±%
Liberal	Joanna Gash	43,089	56.11	+10.97
Labor	Peter Knott	20,011	26.06	−9.78
One Nation	Geoff Crocker	4,454	5.80	−5.24
Greens	Jane Bange	4,218	5.49	+2.78
Democrats	Michael Hayes	3,323	4.33	+1.04
Christian Democrats	Steve Ryan	1,253	1.63	−0.36
Unity	Paul McLeod	339	0.44	+0.44
Citizens Electoral Council	Jean McClung	113	0.15	+0.15
Total formal votes		76,800	95.66	−2.05
Informal votes		3,485	4.34	+2.05
Turnout		80,285	96.49	
Two-party-preferred result
Liberal	Joanna Gash	49,634	64.63	+10.08
Labor	Peter Knott	27,166	35.37	−10.08
Liberal hold		Swing	+10.08	

=== Grayndler ===
This section is an excerpt from Electoral results for the Division of Grayndler § 2001

2001 Australian federal election: Grayndler
Party	Candidate	Votes	%	±%
Labor	Anthony Albanese	36,379	49.15	−6.56
Liberal	Brett Kenworthy	16,971	22.93	+2.16
Greens	Sylvia Hale	9,666	13.06	+8.42
Democrats	Matthew Baird	6,750	9.12	+3.34
One Nation	Kane O'Connor	1,485	2.01	−1.06
Unity	Guang Hua Wan	1,009	1.36	−3.14
	Sue Johnson	954	1.29	+1.29
Christian Democrats	Chris Herden	805	1.09	+0.35
Total formal votes		74,019	93.44	−1.45
Informal votes		5,193	6.56	+1.45
Turnout		79,212	92.52	
Two-party-preferred result
Labor	Anthony Albanese	52,770	71.29	−1.03
Liberal	Brett Kenworthy	21,249	28.71	+1.03
Labor hold		Swing	−1.03	

=== Greenway ===
This section is an excerpt from Electoral results for the Division of Greenway § 2001

2001 Australian federal election: Greenway
Party	Candidate	Votes	%	±%
Labor	Frank Mossfield	32,380	42.67	−3.34
Liberal	Rick Holder	28,038	36.94	+5.68
Christian Democrats	Bob Bawden	4,272	5.63	+1.43
One Nation	Tony Pettitt	4,155	5.47	−4.48
Democrats	Joseph Francis	2,818	3.71	−0.83
Greens	Tony Vlatko	2,002	2.64	+0.77
Against Further Immigration	Ted Sherwood	1,608	2.12	+2.12
Independent	Amarjit Singh Tanda	620	0.82	+0.82
Total formal votes		75,893	93.21	−1.36
Informal votes		5,530	6.79	+1.36
Turnout		81,423	95.18	
Two-party-preferred result
Labor	Frank Mossfield	40,310	53.11	−6.44
Liberal	Rick Holder	35,583	46.89	+6.44
Labor hold		Swing	−6.44	

=== Gwydir ===
This section is an excerpt from Electoral results for the Division of Gwydir § 2001

2001 Australian federal election: Gwydir
Party	Candidate	Votes	%	±%
National	John Anderson	40,437	52.63	+11.15
Labor	Anne Murnain	17,402	22.65	−5.71
One Nation	Colin Rogers	7,716	10.04	−9.10
Independent	Bruce Haigh	4,637	6.04	+6.04
Greens	Neil Strachan	1,324	1.72	+1.52
Independent	Bevan O'Regan	1,289	1.68	+1.68
Democrats	Ken Graham	1,242	1.62	−0.83
Citizens Electoral Council	Richard Witten	1,197	1.56	+1.48
Lower Excise Fuel	Harry Weber	1,194	1.55	+1.55
Independent	Gary Edwards	389	0.51	−0.32
Total formal votes		76,827	95.52	−0.51
Informal votes		3,603	4.48	+0.51
Turnout		80,430	95.54	
Two-party-preferred result
National	John Anderson	49,844	64.88	+2.88
Labor	Anne Murnain	26,983	35.12	−2.88
National hold		Swing	+2.88	

=== Hughes ===
This section is an excerpt from Electoral results for the Division of Hughes § 2001

2001 Australian federal election: Hughes
Party	Candidate	Votes	%	±%
Liberal	Danna Vale	42,393	53.61	+5.86
Labor	Christine Hawkins	24,706	31.24	−2.12
One Nation	Susan Oz	3,885	4.91	−3.64
Greens	Simon Heemstra	3,604	4.56	+1.92
Democrats	Bruce van de Weg	2,811	3.55	−0.21
Christian Democrats	William Ryan	1,676	2.12	+2.10
Total formal votes		79,075	95.95	−0.26
Informal votes		3,341	4.05	+0.26
Turnout		82,416	96.51	
Two-party-preferred result
Liberal	Danna Vale	47,773	60.41	+4.05
Labor	Christine Hawkins	31,302	39.59	−4.05
Liberal hold		Swing	+4.05	

=== Hume ===
This section is an excerpt from Electoral results for the Division of Hume § 2001

2001 Australian federal election: Hume
Party	Candidate	Votes	%	±%
Liberal	Alby Schultz	41,899	52.99	+7.45
Labor	Jan Merriman	23,389	29.58	−2.74
One Nation	Charlie Prell	6,589	8.33	−2.29
Democrats	James Roxburgh	3,762	4.76	+0.82
Greens	Kevin Watchirs	3,435	4.34	+1.38
Total formal votes		79,074	96.45	+0.11
Informal votes		2,908	3.55	−0.11
Turnout		81,982	96.15	
Two-party-preferred result
Liberal	Alby Schultz	47,278	59.79	+2.46
Labor	Jan Merriman	31,796	40.21	−2.46
Liberal hold		Swing	+2.46	

=== Hunter ===
This section is an excerpt from Electoral results for the Division of Hunter § 2001

2001 Australian federal election: Hunter
Party	Candidate	Votes	%	±%
Labor	Joel Fitzgibbon	41,123	52.32	−2.94
National	Rob Macaulay	21,613	27.50	+21.95
One Nation	Bill Fox	8,100	10.31	+0.43
Greens	Larry O'Brien	3,553	4.52	+2.30
Democrats	Rod Bennison	3,071	3.91	+1.16
Citizens Electoral Council	Ann Lawler	1,137	1.45	+0.91
Total formal votes		78,597	96.58	−0.20
Informal votes		2,780	3.42	+0.20
Turnout		81,377	96.76	
Two-party-preferred result
Labor	Joel Fitzgibbon	47,838	60.86	−3.83
National	Rob Macaulay	30,759	39.14	+39.14
Labor hold		Swing	−3.83	

=== Kingsford Smith ===
This section is an excerpt from Electoral results for the Division of Kingsford Smith § 2001

2001 Australian federal election: Kingsford Smith
Party	Candidate	Votes	%	±%
Labor	Laurie Brereton	36,428	47.69	−3.70
Liberal	Bruce Notley-Smith	26,169	34.26	+3.27
Greens	Arthur Hurwitz	5,551	7.27	+3.65
Democrats	Peter Zakrzewski	3,974	5.20	+1.19
One Nation	Jill Brown	3,710	4.86	−0.81
	Marina Carman	558	0.73	+0.73
Total formal votes		76,390	93.86	−0.96
Informal votes		4,996	6.14	+0.96
Turnout		81,386	94.60	
Two-party-preferred result
Labor	Laurie Brereton	44,995	58.90	−4.05
Liberal	Bruce Notley-Smith	31,395	41.10	+4.05
Labor hold		Swing	−4.05	

=== Lindsay ===
This section is an excerpt from Electoral results for the Division of Lindsay § 2001

2001 Australian federal election: Lindsay
Party	Candidate	Votes	%	±%
Liberal	Jackie Kelly	34,339	46.93	+4.47
Labor	David Bradbury	25,320	34.60	−3.48
One Nation	Bill Nixon	3,768	5.15	−5.06
Save the ADI Site	Geoff Brown	2,391	3.27	+3.27
Christian Democrats	John Phillips	1,930	2.64	+1.28
Greens	Lesley Edwards	1,819	2.49	+0.49
Democrats	Geraldine Waters	1,584	2.16	−0.78
Independent	Anthony David Courtney	727	0.99	+0.99
No GST	Jean M Eykamp	534	0.73	+0.73
Independent	Steve Lindsay-Henderson	400	0.55	+0.55
Independent	Graham Mitchell	236	0.32	+0.32
Non-Custodial Parents	Stephen Walker	122	0.17	+0.17
Total formal votes		73,170	93.86	−0.71
Informal votes		4,785	6.14	+0.71
Turnout		77,955	96.57	
Two-party-preferred result
Liberal	Jackie Kelly	40,590	55.47	+2.44
Labor	David Bradbury	32,580	44.53	−2.44
Liberal hold		Swing	+2.44	

=== Lowe ===
This section is an excerpt from Electoral results for the Division of Lowe § 2001

2001 Australian federal election: Lowe
Party	Candidate	Votes	%	±%
Labor	John Murphy	33,508	44.77	+8.64
Liberal	David Doust	31,400	41.96	+8.72
Democrats	Anna Garrett	3,359	4.49	+2.09
Greens	Mersina Soulos	3,145	4.20	+2.42
Unity	Ernest Wong	1,700	2.27	−1.76
One Nation	Harry Krumins	1,463	1.95	−1.73
	Max Lane	267	0.36	+0.36
Total formal votes		74,842	94.20	−1.26
Informal votes		4,606	5.80	+1.26
Turnout		79,448	95.38	
Two-party-preferred result
Labor	John Murphy	40,271	53.81	−0.89
Liberal	David Doust	34,571	46.19	+0.89
Labor hold		Swing	−0.89	

=== Lyne ===
This section is an excerpt from Electoral results for the Division of Lyne § 2001

2001 Australian federal election: Lyne
Party	Candidate	Votes	%	±%
National	Mark Vaile	42,699	53.30	+3.61
Labor	Pat Stevens	23,405	29.22	−0.01
One Nation	Lynn Stanfield	8,178	10.21	−2.97
Greens	Siobhan Isherwood	2,380	2.97	+0.75
Democrats	Philip Jirman	2,237	2.79	+0.08
Independent	Dane William Sara	963	1.20	+1.20
Citizens Electoral Council	Graeme Muldoon	248	0.31	+0.07
Total formal votes		80,109	96.10	−0.27
Informal votes		3,247	3.90	+0.27
Turnout		83,356	96.78	
Two-party-preferred result
National	Mark Vaile	49,057	61.24	+1.11
Labor	Pat Stevens	31,052	38.76	−1.11
National hold		Swing	+1.11	

=== Macarthur ===
This section is an excerpt from Electoral results for the Division of Macarthur § 2001

2001 Australian federal election: Macarthur
Party	Candidate	Votes	%	±%
Liberal	Pat Farmer	36,348	50.79	+10.67
Labor	Meg Oates	25,675	35.88	−4.91
One Nation	Len Watkins	3,759	5.25	−5.75
Greens	Geraldine Hunt	2,183	3.05	+0.23
Democrats	Jasmine Lantry	1,555	2.17	−1.97
Christian Democrats	Elwyn Sheppard	1,052	1.47	+1.47
Independent	Gregory John Knowles	757	1.06	+1.06
Non-Custodial Parents	Eric Sanders	236	0.33	+0.33
Total formal votes		71,565	94.07	−2.05
Informal votes		4,508	5.93	+2.05
Turnout		76,073	95.52	
Two-party-preferred result
Liberal	Pat Farmer	40,767	56.96	+8.65
Labor	Meg Oates	30,798	43.04	−8.65
Liberal notional gain from Labor		Swing	+8.65	

=== Mackellar ===
This section is an excerpt from Electoral results for the Division of Mackellar § 2001

2001 Australian federal election: Mackellar
Party	Candidate	Votes	%	±%
Liberal	Bronwyn Bishop	44,854	57.64	+2.51
Labor	Ben Carpentier	14,708	18.90	+0.11
Democrats	Vicki Dimond	7,365	9.46	+0.01
Greens	Andrea Pape	6,277	8.07	+4.75
One Nation	Peter Cuthbertson	2,182	2.80	−4.18
Independent	George May	1,265	1.63	+1.63
Against Further Immigration	Tom Moody	1,171	1.50	+1.50
Total formal votes		77,822	95.34	−1.14
Informal votes		3,801	4.66	+1.14
Turnout		81,623	94.67	
Two-party-preferred result
Liberal	Bronwyn Bishop	52,039	66.87	−0.26
Labor	Ben Carpentier	25,783	33.13	+0.26
Liberal hold		Swing	−0.26	

=== Macquarie ===
This section is an excerpt from Electoral results for the Division of Macquarie § 2001

2001 Australian federal election: Macquarie
Party	Candidate	Votes	%	±%
Liberal	Kerry Bartlett	40,225	51.00	+7.37
Labor	Adam Searle	21,160	26.83	−7.27
Greens	Leigh Williams	6,644	8.42	+5.05
Democrats	Les Majoros	4,304	5.46	−0.98
One Nation	Wayne Buckley	3,893	4.94	−5.29
Christian Democrats	Brian Grigg	1,559	1.98	+1.91
Save the ADI Site	Robert Warren	1,086	1.38	+1.38
Total formal votes		78,861	96.15	−0.89
Informal votes		3,160	3.85	+0.89
Turnout		82,031	95.30	
Two-party-preferred result
Liberal	Kerry Bartlett	46,273	58.67	+2.90
Labor	Adam Searle	32,598	41.33	−2.90
Liberal hold		Swing	+2.90	

=== Mitchell ===
This section is an excerpt from Electoral results for the Division of Mitchell § 2001

2001 Australian federal election: Mitchell
Party	Candidate	Votes	%	±%
Liberal	Alan Cadman	49,995	63.26	+3.35
Labor	John McShane	16,987	21.49	−0.47
Democrats	David Baggs	3,769	4.77	−0.26
Greens	Cindy Taylor	2,470	3.13	+0.87
One Nation	Dale Eder	2,183	2.76	−3.58
Christian Democrats	Ken Gregory	1,681	2.13	+0.53
Against Further Immigration	David Mudgee	1,235	1.56	+1.56
Independent	Stephen Burke	712	0.90	+0.90
Total formal votes		79,032	95.50	−1.05
Informal votes		3,725	4.50	+1.05
Turnout		82,757	95.81	
Two-party-preferred result
Liberal	Alan Cadman	56,366	71.32	+1.85
Labor	John McShane	22,666	28.68	−1.85
Liberal hold		Swing	+1.85	

=== New England ===
This section is an excerpt from Electoral results for the Division of New England § 2001

2001 Australian federal election: New England
Party	Candidate	Votes	%	±%
Independent	Tony Windsor	35,992	45.04	+45.04
National	Stuart St. Clair	31,079	38.90	+6.40
Labor	Annette McCarthy	7,947	9.95	−13.58
One Nation	Kayleen Bounds	2,202	2.76	−11.78
Greens	Michelle Reiner	1,807	2.26	+0.34
Democrats	Chris Reardon	876	1.10	−1.10
Total formal votes		79,903	98.03	+1.68
Informal votes		1,608	1.97	−1.68
Turnout		81,511	96.98	
Notional two-party-preferred count
National	Stuart St. Clair	51,017	63.85	+0.2
Labor	Annette McCarthy	28,886	36.15	−0.2
Two-candidate-preferred result
Independent	Tony Windsor	46,580	58.30	+58.30
National	Stuart St. Clair	33,323	41.70	−21.23
Independent gain from National		Swing	+58.30	

=== Newcastle ===
This section is an excerpt from Electoral results for the Division of Newcastle2001

2001 Australian federal election: Newcastle
Party	Candidate	Votes	%	±%
Labor	Sharon Grierson	32,790	40.95	−8.12
Liberal	David M Williams	24,312	30.37	+27.56
Greens	John Sutton	6,022	7.52	−0.95
One Nation	Barrie Lawn	4,753	5.94	−9.52
Democrats	Mary Kavanagh	4,601	5.75	−2.31
Progressive Labour	Harry Williams	4,093	5.11	+3.59
Independent	Harry Criticos	1,899	2.37	−1.29
Christian Democrats	Elaine Battersby	1,238	1.55	−1.14
	Erin Killion-DelCastillo	354	0.44	+0.44
Total formal votes		80,052	95.20	−0.12
Informal votes		4,037	4.80	+0.12
Turnout		84,089	94.61	
Two-party-preferred result
Labor	Sharon Grierson	45,555	56.91	−10.42
Liberal	David M Williams	34,497	43.09	+43.09
Labor hold		Swing	−10.42	

=== North Sydney ===
This section is an excerpt from Electoral results for the Division of North Sydney § 2001

2001 Australian federal election: North Sydney
Party	Candidate	Votes	%	±%
Liberal	Joe Hockey	44,995	56.96	+1.80
Labor	Fran Teirney	19,325	24.47	−1.31
Democrats	Bryan McGuire	6,528	8.26	+1.13
Greens	Mike Steel	6,053	7.66	+3.81
Christian Democrats	Colin Ward	1,227	1.55	+0.81
Unity	Brian Lam	861	1.09	−2.92
Total formal votes		78,989	95.98	−0.70
Informal votes		3,310	4.02	+0.70
Turnout		82,299	93.11	
Two-party-preferred result
Liberal	Joe Hockey	49,934	63.21	+0.55
Labor	Fran Teirney	29,055	36.79	−0.55
Liberal hold		Swing	+0.55	

=== Page ===
This section is an excerpt from Electoral results for the Division of Page § 2001

2001 Australian federal election: Page
Party	Candidate	Votes	%	±%
National	Ian Causley	31,204	41.85	−0.46
Labor	Terry Flanagan	21,618	29.00	−6.38
Independent	Tom Cooper	5,482	7.35	+7.35
Greens	John Corkill	5,365	7.20	+2.53
One Nation	Marie Mathew	4,039	5.42	−5.32
Democrats	Allan Jeffreys	2,012	2.70	−0.17
Christian Democrats	Arthur James Felsch	1,344	1.80	+0.54
HEMP	Judy Canales	1,274	1.71	+1.71
Independent	Kathryn Pollard-O'Hara	1,240	1.66	+1.66
Independent	Doug Behn	636	0.85	−0.95
	Edda Lampis	231	0.31	+0.31
Citizens Electoral Council	Angela Griffiths	110	0.15	+0.15
Total formal votes		74,555	94.68	−2.73
Informal votes		4,189	5.32	+2.73
Turnout		78,744	96.36	
Two-party-preferred result
National	Ian Causley	39,342	52.77	−0.59
Labor	Terry Flanagan	35,213	47.23	+0.59
National hold		Swing	−0.59	

=== Parkes ===
This section is an excerpt from Electoral results for the Division of Parkes § 2001

2001 Australian federal election: Parkes
Party	Candidate	Votes	%	±%
National	John Cobb	39,133	51.10	+21.85
Labor	Joe Knagge	25,429	33.21	−0.64
One Nation	Bob Redfern	7,969	10.41	−2.20
Democrats	Geoff Ward	2,111	2.76	+1.07
Greens	Samantha Dunlop	1,936	2.53	+2.49
Total formal votes		76,578	96.50	−0.42
Informal votes		2,781	3.50	+0.42
Turnout		79,359	96.08	
Two-party-preferred result
National	John Cobb	44,982	58.74	+2.36
Labor	Joe Knagge	31,596	41.26	−2.36
National hold		Swing	+2.36	

=== Parramatta ===
This section is an excerpt from Electoral results for the Division of Parramatta § 2001

2001 Australian federal election: Parramatta
Party	Candidate	Votes	%	±%
Liberal	Ross Cameron	35,356	45.94	+5.59
Labor	David Borger	31,867	41.41	−0.34
Democrats	Anthony Clark	2,622	3.41	+0.50
Greens	Felicity George	2,380	3.09	+1.35
One Nation	John Satchwell	2,279	2.96	−3.38
Christian Democrats	Dee Jonsson	1,177	1.53	−0.05
Unity	Somchai Tongsumrith	1,131	1.47	−2.73
Non-Custodial Parents	Will Watson	148	0.19	+0.19
Total formal votes		76,960	93.79	−1.03
Informal votes		5,098	6.21	+1.03
Turnout		82,058	94.47	
Two-party-preferred result
Liberal	Ross Cameron	39,367	51.15	+3.64
Labor	David Borger	37,593	48.85	−3.64
Liberal notional gain from Labor		Swing	+3.64	

=== Paterson ===
This section is an excerpt from Electoral results for the Division of Paterson § 2001

2001 Australian federal election: Paterson
Party	Candidate	Votes	%	±%
Labor	Bob Horne	31,430	40.75	+0.16
Liberal	Bob Baldwin	30,781	39.91	+7.17
National	Ian Shaw	5,544	7.19	−2.47
One Nation	Paul Cary	4,233	5.49	−3.84
Greens	Aina Ranke	2,095	2.72	+0.87
Democrats	Sharon Davies	1,979	2.57	+0.44
Fishing Party	Paul Hennelly	720	0.93	+0.93
Citizens Electoral Council	Tony King	339	0.44	−0.36
Total formal votes		77,121	96.39	−0.20
Informal votes		2,890	3.61	+0.20
Turnout		80,011	97.27	
Two-party-preferred result
Liberal	Bob Baldwin	39,658	51.42	+0.16
Labor	Bob Horne	37,463	48.58	−0.16
Liberal notional hold		Swing	+0.16	

=== Prospect ===
This section is an excerpt from Electoral results for the Division of Prospect § 2001

2001 Australian federal election: Prospect
Party	Candidate	Votes	%	±%
Labor	Janice Crosio	41,596	55.36	−1.23
Liberal	Gareth Perkins	20,776	27.65	+1.98
Greens	Rebecca Filipczyk	3,439	4.58	+3.07
One Nation	John Hutchinson	3,380	4.50	−3.19
Christian Democrats	Lewis Haroon	1,927	2.56	+2.31
Democrats	Thomas Peacock	1,723	2.29	−2.60
Against Further Immigration	Garry Oates	1,274	1.70	+1.70
Unity	Kek Tai	1,027	1.37	−1.43
Total formal votes		75,142	91.05	−2.64
Informal votes		7,388	8.95	+2.64
Turnout		82,530	95.60	
Two-party-preferred result
Labor	Janice Crosio	47,197	62.81	−3.96
Liberal	Gareth Perkins	27,945	37.19	+3.96
Labor hold		Swing	−3.96	

=== Reid ===
This section is an excerpt from Electoral results for the Division of Reid § 2001

2001 Australian federal election: Reid
Party	Candidate	Votes	%	±%
Labor	Laurie Ferguson	36,474	57.09	−0.96
Liberal	Irfan Yusuf	14,364	22.48	+1.18
One Nation	Shane O'Connor	3,476	5.44	−1.20
Unity	Habib Chamas	3,056	4.78	−0.82
Democrats	Adrian Archer	2,183	3.42	+0.40
Greens	Steve Maxwell	1,920	3.01	+1.28
Christian Democrats	Uwe Ledermann	1,502	2.35	−0.90
	Lisa Macdonald	916	1.43	+1.43
Total formal votes		63,891	88.92	−4.02
Informal votes		7,964	11.08	+4.02
Turnout		71,855	93.51	
Two-party-preferred result
Labor	Laurie Ferguson	42,726	66.87	−5.30
Liberal	Irfan Yusuf	21,165	33.13	+5.30
Labor hold		Swing	−5.30	

=== Richmond ===
This section is an excerpt from Electoral results for the Division of Richmond § 2001

2001 Australian federal election: Richmond
Party	Candidate	Votes	%	±%
National	Larry Anthony	32,516	44.76	+5.50
Labor	Jenny McAllister	24,702	34.00	−4.65
Greens	Jan Barham	7,310	10.06	+4.36
One Nation	Dell Rolfe	3,016	4.15	−6.09
Democrats	Casey Balk	2,085	2.87	−0.03
Independent	Julie Nathan	942	1.30	+1.30
HEMP	Dean Jefferys	919	1.26	+1.26
One Nation	John Penhaligon	668	0.92	+0.92
Independent	Rob Simpson	249	0.34	+0.34
Independent	Nicolas Faulkner	161	0.22	+0.22
Non-Custodial Parents	Alexander Peniazev	85	0.12	+0.12
Total formal votes		72,653	94.65	−2.65
Informal votes		4,106	5.35	+2.65
Turnout		76,759	95.00	
Two-party-preferred result
National	Larry Anthony	37,545	51.68	+0.85
Labor	Jenny McAllister	35,108	48.32	−0.85
National hold		Swing	+0.85	

=== Riverina ===
This section is an excerpt from Electoral results for the Division of Riverina § 2001

2001 Australian federal election: Riverina
Party	Candidate	Votes	%	±%
National	Kay Hull	49,371	61.45	+29.25
Labor	Andrew Albiston	19,285	24.00	−3.38
One Nation	Neil Turner	4,496	5.60	−5.89
Democrats	Rex Graham	2,031	2.53	+0.24
Greens	Catherine Moore	1,954	2.43	+2.22
Independent	Dennis Richter	1,839	2.29	+2.29
Christian Democrats	Russell Dancey	1,371	1.71	+1.71
Total formal votes		80,347	95.84	−1.00
Informal votes		3,488	4.16	+1.00
Turnout		83,835	96.48	
Two-party-preferred result
National	Kay Hull	56,138	69.88	+5.22
Labor	Andrew Albiston	24,209	30.12	−5.22
National hold		Swing	+5.22	

=== Robertson ===
This section is an excerpt from Electoral results for the Division of Robertson § 2001

2001 Australian federal election: Robertson
Party	Candidate	Votes	%	±%
Liberal	Jim Lloyd	38,448	50.80	+6.90
Labor	Trish Moran	25,789	34.08	−5.77
Democrats	Harry Boyle	2,736	3.62	−0.78
Greens	Stephen Lacey	2,512	3.32	+1.19
One Nation	Errol Baker	2,333	3.08	−6.16
Christian Democrats	Christine Hennig	1,092	1.44	+1.44
Independent	Kevin Wills	744	0.98	+0.98
Independent	Kaijin Kenisciehad	657	0.87	+0.87
Independent	James Laing-Peach	525	0.69	+0.69
Progressive Labour	Barry Phillips	374	0.49	+0.49
Independent	Alasdair Munn	348	0.46	+0.46
Citizens Electoral Council	Ken Martin	125	0.17	+0.17
Total formal votes		75,683	93.89	−3.20
Informal votes		4,928	6.11	+3.20
Turnout		80,611	96.25	
Two-party-preferred result
Liberal	Jim Lloyd	43,121	56.98	+4.97
Labor	Trish Moran	32,562	43.02	−4.97
Liberal hold		Swing	+4.97	

=== Shortland ===
This section is an excerpt from Electoral results for the Division of Shortland § 2001

2001 Australian federal election: Shortland
Party	Candidate	Votes	%	±%
Labor	Jill Hall	39,139	49.70	−2.24
Liberal	Brian Perrem	27,302	34.67	+6.33
One Nation	Iris Candlish	3,686	4.68	−5.63
Greens	Joan Lambert	3,242	4.12	+0.60
Democrats	Steven Adams	2,484	3.15	−0.25
Independent	Peter Craig	2,312	2.94	+2.94
Independent	Ron Gardnir	590	0.75	+0.75
Total formal votes		78,755	95.44	−1.60
Informal votes		3,765	4.56	+1.60
Turnout		82,520	96.19	
Two-party-preferred result
Labor	Jill Hall	46,290	58.78	−3.45
Liberal	Brian Perrem	32,465	41.22	+3.45
Labor hold		Swing	−3.45	

=== Sydney ===
This section is an excerpt from Electoral results for the Division of Sydney § 2001

2001 Australian federal election: Sydney
Party	Candidate	Votes	%	±%
Labor	Tanya Plibersek	32,962	44.33	−8.58
Liberal	Jeff Pettett	22,380	30.10	+4.28
Greens	Jamie Parker	10,924	14.69	+8.32
Democrats	Sydney Hickman	8,093	10.88	+4.01
Total formal votes		74,359	95.76	+0.08
Informal votes		3,292	4.24	−0.08
Turnout		77,651	91.07	
Two-party-preferred result
Labor	Tanya Plibersek	48,363	65.04	−4.72
Liberal	Jeff Pettett	25,996	34.96	+4.72
Labor hold		Swing	−4.72	

=== Throsby ===
This section is an excerpt from Electoral results for the Division of Throwsby § 2001

2001 Australian federal election: Throsby
Party	Candidate	Votes	%	±%
Labor	Jennie George	41,963	54.90	−6.32
Liberal	Alan Akhurst	19,280	25.22	+7.84
Democrats	Madeleine Roberts	5,743	7.51	+3.72
One Nation	Ivan Prsa	4,969	6.50	−4.83
Greens	Elsa Story	3,444	4.51	+1.45
	Margaret Perrott	1,043	1.36	+1.36
Total formal votes		76,442	94.81	−1.29
Informal votes		4,183	5.19	+1.29
Turnout		80,625	96.06	
Two-party-preferred result
Labor	Jennie George	49,767	65.10	−7.32
Liberal	Alan Akhurst	26,675	34.90	+7.32
Labor hold		Swing	−7.32	

=== Warringah ===
This section is an excerpt from Electoral results for the Division of Warringah § 2001

2001 Australian federal election: Warringah
Party	Candidate	Votes	%	±%
Liberal	Tony Abbott	39,816	51.45	−3.43
Independent	Peter Macdonald	21,490	27.77	+27.77
Labor	Julie Heraghty	9,352	12.08	−15.56
Greens	Keelah Lam	2,859	3.69	−0.40
Democrats	Nina Burridge	2,092	2.70	−3.35
One Nation	David Kelly	1,347	1.74	−3.83
No GST	Christine Ferguson	437	0.56	+0.37
Total formal votes		77,393	96.72	−0.11
Informal votes		2,627	3.28	+0.11
Turnout		80,020	94.16	
Two-party-preferred result
Liberal	Tony Abbott	50,141	62.66	
Labor	Julie Heraghty	29,959	37.34	
Two-candidate-preferred result
Liberal	Tony Abbott	43,085	55.67	−7.31
Independent	Peter Macdonald	34,308	44.33	+44.33
Liberal hold		Swing	−7.31	

=== Watson ===
This section is an excerpt from Electoral results for the Division of Watson § 2001

2001 Australian federal election: Watson
Party	Candidate	Votes	%	±%
Labor	Leo McLeay	39,516	56.15	−1.07
Liberal	Arnold Plooy	19,791	28.12	+1.73
Unity	Ken Nam	3,349	4.76	−0.51
Democrats	Kristin Griffiths	2,788	3.96	+0.80
Greens	Dominic Fitzsimmons	2,446	3.48	+2.00
One Nation	Michelle Farrell	2,165	3.08	−1.54
	Ronald Poulsen	322	0.46	+0.46
Total formal votes		70,377	92.48	−2.41
Informal votes		5,726	7.52	+2.41
Turnout		76,103	93.23	
Two-party-preferred result
Labor	Leo McLeay	47,374	67.31	−0.31
Liberal	Arnold Plooy	23,003	32.69	+0.31
Labor hold		Swing	−0.31	

=== Wentworth ===
This section is an excerpt from Electoral results for the Division of Wentworth § 2001

2001 Australian federal election: Wentworth
Party	Candidate	Votes	%	±%
Liberal	Peter King	39,298	52.08	+1.99
Labor	Carolyn Neilson	22,277	29.52	−3.49
Greens	Alison Lyssa	7,371	9.77	+4.88
Democrats	Margaret Collings	4,639	6.15	+0.11
One Nation	Aub Golden	1,233	1.63	−1.00
Unity	Alan Jacobs	642	0.85	+0.85
Total formal votes		75,460	95.15	−1.20
Informal votes		3,845	4.85	+1.20
Turnout		79,305	92.29	
Two-party-preferred result
Liberal	Peter King	43,660	57.86	+0.49
Labor	Carolyn Neilson	31,800	42.14	−0.49
Liberal hold		Swing	+0.49	

=== Werriwa ===
This section is an excerpt from Electoral results for the Division of Werriwa § 2001

2001 Australian federal election: Werriwa
Party	Candidate	Votes	%	±%
Labor	Mark Latham	35,980	50.33	−1.15
Liberal	Paul Masina	23,816	33.32	+4.24
One Nation	P. Kotarski	3,372	4.72	−6.16
Greens	Roger Barsony	1,891	2.65	+0.87
Democrats	Glenda Blanch	1,886	2.64	−0.79
Christian Democrats	Greg Tan	1,759	2.46	+2.46
Unity	John Uri	1,527	2.14	−0.04
Against Further Immigration	Janey Woodger	1,256	1.76	+1.76
Total formal votes		71,487	91.49	−3.32
Informal votes		6,651	8.51	+3.32
Turnout		78,138	94.47	
Two-party-preferred result
Labor	Mark Latham	41,810	58.49	−4.13
Liberal	Paul Masina	29,677	41.51	+4.13
Labor hold		Swing	−4.13	

== See also ==
- Results of the 2001 Australian federal election (House of Representatives)
- Members of the Australian House of Representatives, 2001–2004
