= Results of the 2004 Australian federal election in New South Wales =

2004 Australian federal election (New South Wales)
← 2001	9 October 2004	2007 →

All 50 New South Wales seats in the Australian House of Representatives and 6 seats in the Australian Senate

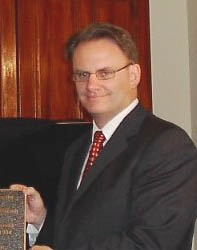

	First party	Second party	Third party
Leader	John Howard	Mark Latham	None
Party	Liberal/National coalition	Labor	Greens
Last election	28 seats	20 seats	0 seats
Seats before	28	19	1
Seats won	27	21	0
Seat change	▼1	▲2	▼1
Popular vote	1,745,181	1,412,418	311,369
Percentage	45.34%	36.70%	8.09%
Swing	▲2.55	▲0.25	▲3.34
TPP	51.93%	48.07%
TPP swing	▲0.27	▼0.27

This is a list of electoral division results in the Australian 2004 federal election for the state of New South Wales.

This election was held using instant-runoff voting. At this election, there were two "turn-overs" in New South Wales. Labor won the seat of Parramatta despite the Liberals finishing first, as well as the seat of Richmond despite the Nationals finishing first.

== Overall ==
Turnout 94.70% (CV) — Informal 6.12%
Party	Votes	%	Swing	Seats	Change
Liberal	1,391,511	36.16	+2.58	21	Steady
National	353,670	9.19	–0.03	6	▼1
Liberal–National coalition	1,745,181	45.34	+2.54	27	▼1
Labor	1,412,418	36.70	+0.25	21	▲1 (Note: Stephen Martin (Labor) had won the seat of Cunningham at the 2001 election, however he retired in 2002. Michael Organ (Greens) won the seat at the resulting by-election however Sharon Bird regained the seat for Labor at this election.)
Greens	311,369	8.09	3.34	0	Steady
One Nation	53,881	1.40	-3.37		
Christian Democrats	47,132	1.22	0.00		
Democrats	41,072	1.07	-3.17		
Family First	29,621	0.77	0.77		
Citizens Electoral Council	11,500	0.30	0.15		
Liberals for Forests	8,165	0.21	0.21		
No GST	7,229	0.19	0.06		
Socialist Alliance	4,415	0.11	0.11		
Progressive Labour	3,775	0.10	-0.02		
Outdoor Recreation	3,505	0.09	0.09		
Save the ADI Site	3,490	0.09	-0.07		
Ex-Service, Service and Veterans	3,108	0.08	0.08		
New Country	2,824	0.07	0.07		
Fishing Party	2,516	0.07	0.05		
Lower Excise Fuel and Beer	2,007	0.05	-0.03		
Non-Custodial Parents	1,132	0.03	0.01		
Nuclear Disarmament	0,341	0.01	0.01		
Independents	154,013	4.00	-0.06	2	Steady
Total	4,099,501			50	
Two-party-preferred vote
Liberal/National Coalition	1,998,699	51.93	+0.27	27	▼1
Labor	1,849,995	48.07	–0.27	21	▲1
Invalid/blank votes	250,807	6.12	+0.25		
Registered voters/turnout	4,329,115	94.70			
Source: AEC Tally Room

Four seats changed hands in NSW during this election, with the Liberal Party experiencing a primary vote of 36.2%, one of its strongest tally's since the 1975 poll and at the expense of the Labor Party. The opposition lost ground in the outer suburbs of Sydney, areas which it once considered to be very strong for its vote. The Nationals' vote remained steady but the Greens' vote increased by 3.3%, the party's second best result in the state.

== New South Wales ==
=== Banks ===
This section is an excerpt from Electoral results for the Division of Banks § 2004

2004 Australian federal election: Banks
Party	Candidate	Votes	%	±%
Labor	Daryl Melham	32,736	44.61	+0.36
Liberal	Roger Gray	30,927	42.15	+6.36
Greens	Stephen Makin	3,433	4.68	+1.87
Christian Democrats	Janne Peterson	2,654	3.62	+0.95
One Nation	Harry Stavrinos	2,302	3.14	−3.17
Democrats	Mark Clyburn	675	0.92	−2.27
Family First	Greg Briscoe-Hough	655	0.89	+0.89
Total formal votes		73,382	92.65	−0.52
Informal votes		5,818	7.35	+0.52
Turnout		79,200	95.09	−0.01
Two-party-preferred result
Labor	Daryl Melham	37,468	51.06	−1.83
Liberal	Roger Gray	35,914	48.94	+1.83
Labor hold		Swing	−1.83	

=== Barton ===
This section is an excerpt from Electoral results for the Division of Barton § 2004

2004 Australian federal election: Barton
Party	Candidate	Votes	%	±%
Labor	Robert McClelland	36,909	49.66	+1.67
Liberal	Bruce Morrow	29,319	39.44	+1.71
Greens	Angelo Mourikis	5,169	6.95	+4.05
Democrats	Eoin Coghlan	1,648	2.22	−2.23
One Nation	Neil Baird	1,284	1.73	−1.92
Total formal votes		74,329	93.04	−0.37
Informal votes		5,563	6.96	+0.37
Turnout		79,892	94.44	+0.02
Two-party-preferred result
Labor	Robert McClelland	42,772	57.54	+1.52
Liberal	Bruce Morrow	31,557	42.46	−1.52
Labor hold		Swing	+1.52	

=== Bennelong ===
This section is an excerpt from Electoral results for the Division of Bennelong § 2004

2004 Australian federal election: Bennelong
Party	Candidate	Votes	%	±%
Liberal	John Howard	38,326	49.89	−3.18
Labor	Nicole Campbell	21,819	28.40	−2.54
Greens	Andrew Wilkie	12,573	16.37	+12.34
Christian Democrats	Ray Levick	1,824	2.37	+2.37
Democrats	Peter Goldfinch	967	1.26	−4.42
Independent	Gary Hannah	854	1.11	+1.11
Independent	Troy Rollo	451	0.59	+0.59
Total formal votes		76,814	94.16	−0.42
Informal votes		4,762	5.84	+0.42
Turnout		81,576	94.61	+0.02
Two-party-preferred result
Liberal	John Howard	41,735	54.33	−3.38
Labor	Nicole Campbell	35,079	45.67	+3.38
Liberal hold		Swing	−3.38	

=== Berowra ===
This section is an excerpt from Electoral results for the Division of Berowra § 2004

2004 Australian federal election: Berowra
Party	Candidate	Votes	%	±%
Liberal	Philip Ruddock	43,674	56.14	−2.43
Labor	Michael Colnan	20,351	26.16	+3.35
Greens	Erland Merlin Howden	7,465	9.60	+4.42
Christian Democrats	Bruce Coleman	2,411	3.10	+1.00
Democrats	Margaret van de Weg	1,457	1.87	−4.62
Family First	Lance Clark	883	1.14	+1.14
Independent	Matthew Benson	860	1.11	+1.11
Independent	Ross Blade	694	0.89	+0.89
Total formal votes		77,795	94.41	−1.23
Informal votes		4,606	5.59	+1.23
Turnout		82,401	94.63	−0.22
Two-party-preferred result
Liberal	Philip Ruddock	48,358	62.16	−3.49
Labor	Michael Colnan	29,437	37.84	+3.49
Liberal hold		Swing	−3.49	

=== Blaxland ===
This section is an excerpt from Electoral results for the Division of Blaxland § 2004

2004 Australian federal election: Blaxland
Party	Candidate	Votes	%	±%
Labor	Michael Hatton	37,117	53.79	−0.34
Liberal	Mark Majewski	21,407	31.02	+5.11
One Nation	Bob Vinnicombe	3,300	4.78	−1.28
Greens	Marlene Marquez-Obeid	3,205	4.64	+2.02
Christian Democrats	Matthew Squires	2,378	3.45	+1.26
Democrats	Martine Eve-Macleod	875	1.27	−3.67
Socialist Alliance	Raul Bassi	493	0.71	+0.71
Citizens Electoral Council	Terry Boath	230	0.33	+0.33
Total formal votes		69,005	89.30	−0.92
Informal votes		8,271	10.70	+0.92
Turnout		77,276	93.73	−0.17
Two-party-preferred result
Labor	Michael Hatton	43,383	62.87	−2.34
Liberal	Mark Majewski	25,622	37.13	+2.34
Labor hold		Swing	−2.34	

=== Bradfield ===
This section is an excerpt from Electoral results for the Division of Bradfield § 2004

2004 Australian federal election: Bradfield
Party	Candidate	Votes	%	±%
Liberal	Brendan Nelson	51,356	63.58	−1.02
Labor	Neil Neelam	16,735	20.72	+1.71
Greens	Robert H Goodwill	9,249	11.45	+4.76
Democrats	Jeannette Tsoulos	1,971	2.44	−4.24
Family First	Sarah Montgomery	1,459	1.81	+1.81
Total formal votes		80,770	95.65	−0.59
Informal votes		3,675	4.35	+0.59
Turnout		84,445	93.81	−0.41
Two-party-preferred result
Liberal	Brendan Nelson	55,336	68.51	−2.65
Labor	Neil Neelam	25,434	31.49	+2.65
Liberal hold		Swing	−2.65	

=== Calare ===
This section is an excerpt from Electoral results for the Division of Calare § 2004

2004 Australian federal election: Calare
Party	Candidate	Votes	%	±%
Independent	Peter Andren	40,851	50.23	−1.17
Labor	Robyn Adams	13,439	16.52	−4.04
Liberal	Paul Blanch	13,087	16.09	+16.09
National	Robert Griffith	10,482	12.89	−7.64
Greens	Stephen Nugent	1,868	2.30	+0.77
Family First	Melanie Woods	959	1.18	+1.18
Citizens Electoral Council	Heidi van Schaik	648	0.80	+0.41
Total formal votes		81,334	96.47	−0.25
Informal votes		2,980	3.53	+0.25
Turnout		84,314	95.67	−0.51
Notional two-party-preferred count
Liberal	Paul Blanch	41,562	51.1	−0.63
Labor	Robyn Adams	39,772	48.9	+0.63
Two-candidate-preferred result
Independent	Peter Andren	57,939	71.24	−3.80
Liberal	Paul Blanch	23,395	28.76	+28.76
Independent hold		Swing	−3.80	

=== Charlton ===
This section is an excerpt from Electoral results for the Division of Charlton § 2004

2004 Australian federal election: Charlton
Party	Candidate	Votes	%	±%
Labor	Kelly Hoare	35,765	45.95	−0.11
Liberal	Kurt Darcey	27,480	35.31	+2.00
Greens	Suzanne Pritchard	6,964	8.95	+4.01
Family First	Paul Scarfe	3,317	4.26	+4.26
One Nation	Bob Johnson	2,416	3.10	−4.63
Democrats	Ben Roffey	1,513	1.94	−3.13
Citizens Electoral Council	David Stow	380	0.49	+0.49
Total formal votes		77,835	95.04	−0.38
Informal votes		4,059	4.96	+0.38
Turnout		81,894	95.73	+0.10
Two-party-preferred result
Labor	Kelly Hoare	45,084	57.92	+1.26
Liberal	Kurt Darcey	32,751	42.08	−1.26
Labor hold		Swing	+1.26	

=== Chifley ===
This section is an excerpt from Electoral results for the Division of Chifley § 2004

2004 Australian federal election: Chifley
Party	Candidate	Votes	%	±%
Labor	Roger Price	39,836	55.65	−0.65
Liberal	Costa Asarloglou	20,814	29.08	+3.56
Greens	Debbie Robertson	4,326	6.04	+4.33
Christian Democrats	Dave Vincent	2,653	3.71	+1.21
One Nation	Terry Cooksley	1,579	2.21	−4.01
Family First	Robert Heathcote	1,211	1.69	+1.69
Independent	Wayne Hyland	850	1.19	+0.40
	Graham Rand	315	0.44	+0.44
Total formal votes		71,584	89.90	−0.90
Informal votes		8,043	10.10	+0.90
Turnout		79,627	94.31	+0.10
Two-party-preferred result
Labor	Roger Price	45,084	62.98	−2.31
Liberal	Costa Asarloglou	26,500	37.02	+2.31
Labor hold		Swing	−2.31	

=== Cook ===
This section is an excerpt from Electoral results for the Division of Cook § 2004

2004 Australian federal election: Cook
Party	Candidate	Votes	%	±%
Liberal	Bruce Baird	43,161	58.03	+1.81
Labor	Mark Buttigieg	20,593	27.69	+1.20
Greens	Corey Birtles	5,144	6.92	+3.36
Christian Democrats	Beth Smith	1,735	2.33	+0.65
One Nation	Andy Frew	1,582	2.13	−3.84
No GST	Peter Phillips	1,035	1.39	+1.39
Democrats	David Mendelssohn	661	0.89	−2.88
Independent	Graeme Strang	466	0.63	+0.06
Total formal votes		74,377	94.47	−0.88
Informal votes		4,350	5.53	+0.88
Turnout		78,727	95.22	−0.06
Two-party-preferred result
Liberal	Bruce Baird	47,470	63.82	−0.18
Labor	Mark Buttigieg	26,907	36.18	+0.18
Liberal hold		Swing	−0.18	

=== Cowper ===
This section is an excerpt from Electoral results for the Division of Cowper § 2004

2004 Australian federal election: Cowper
Party	Candidate	Votes	%	±%
National	Luke Hartsuyker	38,998	50.20	+20.31
Labor	Allan Williams	24,873	32.02	−0.29
Greens	John Carty	7,239	9.32	+3.80
One Nation	Allan Stokes	3,098	3.99	−3.07
Lower Excise Fuel	Norm Mann	2,007	2.58	−0.02
Democrats	Trevor Kapeen	1,468	1.89	−0.82
Total formal votes		77,683	95.96	+0.07
Informal votes		3,273	4.04	−0.07
Turnout		80,956	95.19	−0.12
Two-party-preferred result
National	Luke Hartsuyker	43,853	56.45	+1.72
Labor	Allan Williams	33,830	43.55	−1.72
National hold		Swing	+1.72	

=== Cunningham ===
This section is an excerpt from Electoral results for the Division of Cunningham § 2004

2004 Australian federal election: Cunningham
Party	Candidate	Votes	%	±%
Labor	Sharon Bird	29,041	39.64	−4.55
Liberal	John Larter	21,115	28.82	+0.78
Greens	Michael Organ	14,747	20.13	+13.49
Christian Democrats	Jeff Dakers	2,547	3.48	+0.99
Independent Liberal	David Moulds	1,796	2.45	+2.45
Progressive Labour	James Stewart Keene	1,774	2.42	+2.42
Democrats	Tony Evans	686	0.94	−6.23
Liberals for Forests	Christopher Scrogie	509	0.69	+0.69
Independent	Paul Wilcock	375	0.51	+0.51
Non-Custodial Parents	John Flanagan	355	0.48	+0.48
Socialist Alliance	Chris Williams	310	0.42	+0.42
Total formal votes		73,255	93.55	−1.61
Informal votes		5,048	6.45	+1.61
Turnout		78,303	95.67	+0.25
Two-party-preferred result
Labor	Sharon Bird	45,026	61.46	+0.81
Liberal	John Larter	28,229	38.54	−0.81
Labor hold		Swing	0.81	

- Stephen Martin (Labor) had won the seat at the 2001 election, however he retired in 2002 and Michael Organ (Greens) won the seat at the resulting by-election.

=== Dobell ===
This section is an excerpt from Electoral results for the Division of Dobell § 2004

2004 Australian federal election: Dobell
Party	Candidate	Votes	%	±%
Liberal	Ken Ticehurst	37,347	49.53	+5.60
Labor	David Mehan	27,417	36.36	−6.32
Greens	Scott Rickard	3,782	5.02	+2.07
Family First	Naomi Paton	1,656	2.20	+2.20
Liberals for Forests	Frank Sanzari	1,487	1.97	+1.97
One Nation	Andrew Webber	1,163	1.54	−2.78
Democrats	Carolyn Hastie	647	0.86	−3.35
Independent	Paul Unger	475	0.63	+0.63
Outdoor Recreation	Siou Hong Chia	445	0.59	+0.59
Independent	Les Wallace	430	0.57	+0.57
Independent	James Laing-Peach	417	0.55	+0.55
Citizens Electoral Council	Steven Hughes	132	0.18	+0.18
Total formal votes		75,398	92.59	−3.15
Informal votes		6,037	7.41	+3.15
Turnout		81,435	95.07	+0.09
Two-party-preferred result
Liberal	Ken Ticehurst	42,151	55.90	+5.52
Labor	David Mehan	33,247	44.10	−5.52
Liberal hold		Swing	+5.52	

=== Eden-Monaro ===
This section is an excerpt from Electoral results for the Division of Eden-Monaro § 2004

2004 Australian federal election: Eden-Monaro
Party	Candidate	Votes	%	±%
Liberal	Gary Nairn	40,783	48.48	+7.40
Labor	Kel Watt	32,592	38.74	+2.00
Greens	Cecily Dignan	6,256	7.44	+2.46
One Nation	Don Tarlinton	1,541	1.83	−1.76
Christian Democrats	Ursula Bennett	1,170	1.39	+0.08
Outdoor Recreation	Tim Quilty	1,063	1.26	+1.26
Democrats	Nazia Ahmed	725	0.86	−2.43
Total formal votes		84,130	95.43	−0.15
Informal votes		4,032	4.57	+0.15
Turnout		88,162	95.28	−0.42
Two-party-preferred result
Liberal	Gary Nairn	43,867	52.14	+0.45
Labor	Kel Watt	40,263	47.86	−0.45
Liberal hold		Swing	+0.45	

=== Farrer ===
This section is an excerpt from Electoral results for the Division of Farrer § 2004

2004 Australian federal election: Farrer
Party	Candidate	Votes	%	±%
Liberal	Sussan Ley	48,304	63.48	+25.82
Labor	Nico Mathews	17,354	22.81	+1.85
Greens	Bruce Rowston	2,732	3.59	+0.17
Independent	John Burbidge	1,956	2.57	+2.57
One Nation	Ray Jones	1,618	2.13	−4.22
Family First	Jennifer Weller	1,395	1.83	+1.83
Christian Democrats	Ian Paul Burn	1,275	1.68	+1.68
Independent	Matt Morgan	682	0.90	+0.90
Democrats	Frank Kovacs	463	0.61	−1.98
Citizens Electoral Council	Chris Lahy	318	0.42	+0.42
Total formal votes		76,097	93.30	−0.31
Informal votes		5,464	6.70	+0.31
Turnout		81,561	95.16	−0.42
Two-party-preferred result
Liberal	Sussan Ley	53,129	69.82	+19.68
Labor	Nico Mathews	22,968	30.18	+30.18
Liberal hold		Swing	+19.68	

=== Fowler ===
This section is an excerpt from Electoral results for the Division of Fowler § 2004

2004 Australian federal election: Fowler
Party	Candidate	Votes	%	±%
Labor	Julia Irwin	44,141	62.78	+2.08
Liberal	Philip Powrie	18,253	25.96	+7.92
Greens	Pauline Tyrrell	5,164	7.34	+4.89
Independent	Jose Nunez	1,594	2.27	+2.27
Citizens Electoral Council	Hal Johnson	1,162	1.65	−1.56
Total formal votes		70,314	90.89	+3.64
Informal votes		7,048	9.11	−3.64
Turnout		77,362	93.34	−0.01
Two-party-preferred result
Labor	Julia Irwin	50,174	71.36	−0.13
Liberal	Philip Powrie	20,140	28.64	+0.13
Labor hold		Swing	−0.13	

=== Gilmore ===
This section is an excerpt from Electoral results for the Division of Gilmore § 2004

2004 Australian federal election: Gilmore
Party	Candidate	Votes	%	±%
Liberal	Joanna Gash	43,723	54.58	−1.53
Labor	Megan Pikett	24,835	31.00	+4.95
Greens	Ben van der Wijngaart	6,234	7.78	+2.29
Christian Democrats	Paul Green	3,381	4.22	+2.59
One Nation	Col Harding	1,762	2.20	−3.60
Citizens Electoral Council	Jean McClung	176	0.22	+0.07
Total formal votes		80,111	95.77	+0.11
Informal votes		3,542	4.23	−0.11
Turnout		83,653	95.47	−0.21
Two-party-preferred result
Liberal	Joanna Gash	48,130	60.08	−4.55
Labor	Megan Pikett	31,981	39.92	+4.55
Liberal hold		Swing	−4.55	

=== Grayndler ===
This section is an excerpt from Electoral results for the Division of Grayndler § 2004

2004 Australian federal election: Grayndler
Party	Candidate	Votes	%	±%
Labor	Anthony Albanese	38,634	51.18	+2.03
Liberal	Stephanie Kokkolis	18,347	24.31	+1.38
Greens	Philip Myers	15,914	21.08	+8.02
Democrats	Jen Harrison	1,579	2.09	−7.03
Socialist Alliance	Sue Johnson	1010	1.34	+1.34
Total formal votes		75,484	94.58	+1.14
Informal votes		4,322	5.42	−1.14
Turnout		79,806	92.94	+0.99
Two-party-preferred result
Labor	Anthony Albanese	54,798	72.60	+1.31
Liberal	Stephanie Kokkolis	20,686	27.40	−1.31
Labor hold		Swing	+1.31	

=== Greenway ===
This section is an excerpt from Electoral results for the Division of Greenway § 2004

2004 Australian federal election: Greenway
Party	Candidate	Votes	%	±%
Liberal	Louise Markus	33,353	43.96	+7.02
Labor	Ed Husic	30,389	40.05	−2.61
Greens	Astrid O'Neill	2,730	3.60	+0.96
Christian Democrats	Greg Tan	2,142	2.82	−2.81
Save the ADI Site	Jean Lopez	1,362	1.79	+1.79
One Nation	Tony Pettitt	1,040	1.37	−4.10
Liberals for Forests	Julie-Anne Houlton	895	1.18	+1.18
Fishing Party	Joe Chidiac	881	1.16	+1.16
Family First	John Dorhauer	877	1.16	+1.16
Outdoor Recreation	Grant Bayley	772	1.02	+1.02
Democrats	David King	672	0.89	−2.82
Independent	F Ivor	420	0.55	+0.55
Independent	Amarjit Tanda	267	0.35	−0.47
Citizens Electoral Council	Goran Reves	79	0.10	+0.10
Total formal votes		75,879	88.17	−5.04
Informal votes		10,183	11.83	+5.04
Turnout		86,062	95.31	+0.50
Two-party-preferred result
Liberal	Louise Markus	38,381	50.58	+3.69
Labor	Ed Husic	37,498	49.42	−3.69
Liberal gain from Labor		Swing	+3.69	

=== Gwydir ===
This section is an excerpt from Electoral results for the Division of Gwydir § 2004

2004 Australian federal election: Gwydir
Party	Candidate	Votes	%	±%
National	John Anderson	46,951	61.95	+9.32
Labor	Glenn Sims	17,396	22.95	+0.30
Independent	Bruce Haigh	3,797	5.01	−1.03
One Nation	Colin Rogers	3,441	4.54	−5.50
Greens	Michael Anderson	3,399	4.48	+2.76
Citizens Electoral Council	Richard Stringer	808	1.07	−0.49
Total formal votes		75,792	96.40	+0.93
Informal votes		2,830	3.60	−0.93
Turnout		78,622	95.15	+0.03
Two-party-preferred result
National	John Anderson	51,835	68.39	+3.51
Labor	Glenn Sims	23,957	31.61	−3.51
National hold		Swing	+3.51	

=== Hughes ===
This section is an excerpt from Electoral results for the Division of Hughes § 2004

2004 Australian federal election: Hughes
Party	Candidate	Votes	%	±%
Liberal	Danna Vale	43,726	55.28	+1.67
Labor	Greg Holland	24,739	31.28	+0.04
Greens	Lorraine Dixon	5,372	6.79	+2.23
Christian Democrats	John Vanderjagt	2,589	3.27	+1.15
Veterans	Bob Davis	1,504	1.90	+1.90
Democrats	Rob Bunt	1,162	1.47	−2.08
Total formal votes		79,091	94.93	−0.99
Informal votes		4,220	5.07	+0.99
Turnout		83,312	95.45	−0.69
Two-party-preferred result
Liberal	Danna Vale	48,279	61.04	+0.63
Labor	Greg Holland	30,813	38.96	−0.63
Liberal hold		Swing	+0.63	

=== Hume ===
This section is an excerpt from Electoral results for the Division of Hume § 2004

2004 Australian federal election: Hume
Party	Candidate	Votes	%	±%
Liberal	Alby Schultz	46,652	57.63	+4.64
Labor	Graeme Shannon	22,862	28.24	−1.34
Greens	David Robert Horton	5,264	6.50	+2.16
Christian Democrats	Geoff Peet	2,880	3.56	+3.56
Independent	Peter Martin	1,023	1.26	+1.26
Independent	Arthur Schofield	1,011	1.25	+1.25
Democrats	Giuseppe Minissale	713	0.88	−3.88
Citizens Electoral Council	Lindsay Cosgrove	541	0.67	+0.67
Total formal votes		80,946	94.55	−1.90
Informal votes		4,669	5.45	+1.90
Turnout		85,615	95.57	−0.16
Two-party-preferred result
Liberal	Alby Schultz	51,908	64.13	+4.34
Labor	Graeme Shannon	29,038	35.87	−4.34
Liberal hold		Swing	+4.34	

=== Hunter ===
This section is an excerpt from Electoral results for the Division of Hunter § 2004

2004 Australian federal election: Hunter
Party	Candidate	Votes	%	±%
Labor	Joel Fitzgibbon	43,216	53.60	+1.28
National	Beth Black	21,621	26.81	−0.69
Greens	Kerry Suwald	5,195	6.44	+1.92
Independent	Bill Fox	2,618	3.25	+3.25
Citizens Electoral Council	Ann Lawler	2,590	3.21	+1.76
One Nation	Neil Scholes	2,543	3.15	−7.16
Christian Democrats	Adrian Melbourne	1,673	2.07	+2.07
Family First	Michael Woods	1,176	1.46	+1.46
Total formal votes		80,632	94.70	−1.88
Informal votes		4,512	5.30	+1.88
Turnout		85,144	95.67	−0.46
Two-party-preferred result
Labor	Joel Fitzgibbon	51,401	63.75	+2.89
National	Beth Black	29,231	36.25	−2.89
Labor hold		Swing	+2.89	

=== Kingsford Smith ===
This section is an excerpt from Electoral results for the Division of Kingsford Smith § 2004

2004 Australian federal election: Kingsford Smith
Party	Candidate	Votes	%	±%
Labor	Peter Garrett	36,565	49.60	+1.91
Liberal	Nicholas Prassas	26,639	36.14	+1.88
Greens	Hannah Robert	5,430	7.37	+0.10
Independent	Charles Matthews	2,505	3.40	+3.40
One Nation	Anna Winter	779	1.06	−3.80
Democrats	Nicole Tillotson	747	1.01	−4.19
No GST	Reg Gilroy	563	0.76	+0.76
Socialist Alliance	Maureen Frances	273	0.37	+0.37
	James Cogan	214	0.29	+0.29
Total formal votes		73,715	91.57	−2.29
Informal votes		6,790	8.43	+2.29
Turnout		80,505	93.74	−0.19
Two-party-preferred result
Labor	Peter Garrett	43,498	59.01	+0.11
Liberal	Nicholas Prassas	30,217	40.99	−0.11
Labor hold		Swing	+0.11	

=== Lindsay ===
This section is an excerpt from Electoral results for the Division of Lindsay § 2004

2004 Australian federal election: Lindsay
Party	Candidate	Votes	%	±%
Liberal	Jackie Kelly	35,119	48.07	+1.14
Labor	David Bradbury	27,117	37.12	+2.52
Greens	Gabrielle Worrall	2,547	3.49	+1.00
Christian Democrats	John Phillips	2,026	2.77	+0.13
Save the ADI Site	Barbie Bates	1,953	2.67	−0.60
One Nation	Louise Kedwell	1,367	1.87	−3.28
No GST	Garth Derrig	1,156	1.58	+0.85
Family First	Megan Watson	1,006	1.38	+1.38
Democrats	Geraldine Waters	615	0.84	−1.32
Citizens Electoral Council	Bruce Anderson	148	0.20	+0.20
Total formal votes		73,054	92.55	−1.31
Informal votes		5,880	7.45	+1.31
Turnout		78,934	95.34	−0.17
Two-party-preferred result
Liberal	Jackie Kelly	40,367	55.26	−0.21
Labor	David Bradbury	32,687	44.74	+0.21
Liberal hold		Swing	−0.21	

=== Lowe ===
This section is an excerpt from Electoral results for the Division of Lowe § 2004

2004 Australian federal election: Lowe
Party	Candidate	Votes	%	±%
Labor	John Murphy	32,777	42.89	−1.88
Liberal	John Sidoti	32,654	42.73	+0.77
Greens	Shireen Murphy	7,057	9.24	+5.04
Christian Democrats	Peter Rahme	1,519	1.99	+1.99
Democrats	Biannca Pace	1,013	1.33	−3.16
Liberals for Forests	Timothy Avery	717	0.94	+0.94
One Nation	John Mason	678	0.89	−1.06
Total formal votes		76,415	93.45	−0.75
Informal votes		5,354	6.55	+0.75
Turnout		81,769	94.31	−0.60
Two-party-preferred result
Labor	John Murphy	40,727	53.30	−0.51
Liberal	John Sidoti	35,688	46.70	+0.51
Labor hold		Swing	−0.51	

=== Lyne ===
This section is an excerpt from Electoral results for the Division of Lyne § 2004

2004 Australian federal election: Lyne
Party	Candidate	Votes	%	±%
National	Mark Vaile	46,958	56.31	+3.01
Labor	Greg Watters	22,325	26.77	−2.45
Greens	Jeremy Bradley	3,966	4.76	+1.79
One Nation	Joan Stanfield	3,046	3.65	−6.56
New Country	Robyn Murphy	2,824	3.39	+3.39
Democrats	Peter Wildblood	1,401	1.68	−1.11
Independent	Kerry Salt	1,327	1.59	+1.59
Family First	Simon Apostle	1,181	1.42	+1.42
Citizens Electoral Council	Graeme Muldoon	225	0.27	−0.04
Socialist Alliance	Ron Bailey	141	0.17	+0.17
Total formal votes		83,394	94.51	−1.49
Informal votes		4,749	5.39	+1.49
Turnout		88,143	95.62	−0.30
Two-party-preferred result
National	Mark Vaile	52,564	63.03	+1.79
Labor	Greg Watters	30,830	36.97	−1.79
National hold		Swing	+1.79	

=== Macarthur ===
This section is an excerpt from Electoral results for the Division of Macarthur § 2004

2004 Australian federal election: Macarthur
Party	Candidate	Votes	%	±%
Liberal	Pat Farmer	40,469	54.47	+3.68
Labor	Meg Oates	24,584	33.09	−2.79
Greens	Jennifer Hanson	3,324	4.47	+1.42
Family First	Mick Agius	1,735	2.34	+2.34
Christian Democrats	Ralph Dunkerley	1,730	2.33	+0.86
One Nation	Len Watkins	1,266	1.70	−3.55
Democrats	Lester Pearce	625	0.84	−1.33
Independent	Max Brazenall	558	0.75	+0.75
Total formal votes		74,291	92.63	−1.44
Informal votes		5,907	7.37	+1.44
Turnout		80,198	95.15	+0.21
Two-party-preferred result
Liberal	Pat Farmer	44,209	59.51	+2.55
Labor	Meg Oates	30,082	40.49	−2.55
Liberal hold		Swing	+2.55	

=== Mackellar ===
This section is an excerpt from Electoral results for the Division of Mackellar § 2004

2004 Australian federal election: Mackellar
Party	Candidate	Votes	%	±%
Liberal	Bronwyn Bishop	44,778	57.26	−0.38
Labor	Chris Sharpe	15,492	19.81	+0.91
Greens	Christian Downie	8,193	10.48	+2.41
Independent	Robert Dunn	6,050	7.74	+7.74
Family First	Roz Trestrail	1,318	1.69	+1.69
Independent	Stephen Wells	1,231	1.57	+1.57
Democrats	Mario Nicotra	1,133	1.45	−8.01
Total formal votes		78,195	95.24	−0.10
Informal votes		3,905	4.76	+0.10
Turnout		82,100	94.16	−0.20
Two-party-preferred result
Liberal	Bronwyn Bishop	51,415	65.75	−1.12
Labor	Chris Sharpe	26,780	34.25	+1.12
Liberal hold		Swing	−1.12	

=== Macquarie ===
This section is an excerpt from Electoral results for the Division of Macquarie § 2004

2004 Australian federal election: Macquarie
Party	Candidate	Votes	%	±%
Liberal	Kerry Bartlett	42,021	53.27	+2.27
Labor	Mark Ptolemy	21,898	27.76	+0.93
Greens	Joel Macrae	8,561	10.85	+2.43
Christian Democrats	Brian Grigg	1,855	2.35	+2.27
Independent	Tim Williams	1,774	2.25	+2.25
Family First	Troy Geri	1,082	1.37	+1.37
Democrats	John Haydon	969	1.23	−4.23
No GST	Matthew Derrig	639	0.81	+0.81
Citizens Electoral Council	Michael Segedin	86	0.11	+0.11
Total formal votes		78,885	94.72	−1.43
Informal votes		4,394	5.28	+1.43
Turnout		83,279	95.16	+0.18
Two-party-preferred result
Liberal	Kerry Bartlett	46,482	58.92	+0.25
Labor	Mark Ptolemy	32,403	41.08	−0.25
Liberal hold		Swing	+0.25	

=== Mitchell ===
This section is an excerpt from Electoral results for the Division of Mitchell § 2004

2004 Australian federal election: Mitchell
Party	Candidate	Votes	%	±%
Liberal	Alan Cadman	54,582	64.35	+1.09
Labor	Harmohan Walia	17,673	20.84	−0.65
Greens	Sheryl Jarecki	5,258	6.20	+3.07
Christian Democrats	Michael Horgan	2,161	2.55	+0.42
Democrats	Kamran Keshavarz Talebi	1,440	1.70	−3.07
Family First	Joy Montgomery	1,140	1.34	+1.34
Independent	Stephen Burke	1,048	1.24	+0.34
One Nation	Norman Byleveld	1,037	1.22	−1.54
Independent	Jordie Stuart Bodlay	476	0.56	+0.56
Total formal votes		84,815	93.40	−2.10
Informal votes		5,991	6.60	+2.10
Turnout		90,806	95.10	−0.41
Two-party-preferred result
Liberal	Alan Cadman	59,950	70.68	−0.64
Labor	Harmohan Walia	24,865	29.32	+0.64
Liberal hold		Swing	−0.64	

=== New England ===
This section is an excerpt from Electoral results for the Division of New England § 2004

2004 Australian federal election: New England
Party	Candidate	Votes	%	±%
Independent	Tony Windsor	46,072	57.27	+12.23
National	Trevor Khan	15,031	18.69	−20.21
Liberal	Scot MacDonald	8,070	10.03	+10.03
Labor	Greg Smith	6,988	8.69	−1.26
Greens	Bruce Taylor	2,679	3.33	+1.07
One Nation	Raymond Scholes	1,146	1.42	−1.34
Citizens Electoral Council	Steve Lawler	455	0.57	+0.57
Total formal votes		80,441	97.23	−0.80
Informal votes		2,291	2.77	+0.80
Turnout		82,732	95.40	−0.56
Notional two-party-preferred count
National	Trevor Khan	50,847	63.21	−0.64
Labor	Greg Smith	29,594	36.79	+0.64
Two-candidate-preferred result
Independent	Tony Windsor	57,115	71.00	+12.70
National	Trevor Khan	23,326	29.00	−12.70
Independent hold		Swing	+12.70	

=== Newcastle ===
This section is an excerpt from Electoral results for the Division of Newcastle2004

2004 Australian federal election: Newcastle
Party	Candidate	Votes	%	±%
Labor	Sharon Grierson	37,392	45.98	+5.03
Liberal	Josephine Barfield	28,902	35.54	+5.17
Greens	Annie Rooke-Frizell	9,701	11.93	+4.41
Democrats	Eddie Smith	2,018	2.48	−3.27
Progressive Labour	Harry Williams	2,001	2.46	−2.65
Citizens Electoral Council	Don Bower	813	1.00	+1.00
Socialist Alliance	Peter Robson	491	0.60	+0.60
Total formal votes		81,318	95.01	−0.19
Informal votes		4,271	4.99	+0.19
Turnout		85,589	94.72	+0.45
Two-party-preferred result
Labor	Sharon Grierson	48,771	59.98	+3.07
Liberal	Josephine Barfield	32,547	40.02	−3.07
Labor hold		Swing	+3.07	

=== North Sydney ===
This section is an excerpt from Electoral results for the Division of North Sydney § 2004

2004 Australian federal election: North Sydney
Party	Candidate	Votes	%	±%
Liberal	Joe Hockey	45,105	56.24	−0.72
Labor	Fran Teirney	21,864	27.26	+2.79
Greens	Ted Nixon	9,890	12.33	+4.67
Independent	Edwina Mary Cowdery	1,884	2.35	+2.35
Democrats	Jan de Voogd	1,456	1.82	−6.44
Total formal votes		80,199	96.35	+0.37
Informal votes		3,034	3.65	−0.37
Turnout		83,233	93.43	+0.71
Two-party-preferred result
Liberal	Joe Hockey	48,145	60.03	−3.19
Labor	Fran Teirney	32,054	39.97	+3.19
Liberal hold		Swing	−3.19	

=== Page ===
This section is an excerpt from Electoral results for the Division of Page § 2004

2004 Australian federal election: Page
Party	Candidate	Votes	%	±%
National	Ian Causley	37,637	48.48	+6.63
Labor	Kevin Bell	25,702	33.11	+4.11
Greens	Mark Jackson	8,399	10.82	+3.62
Liberals for Forests	Belinda Anderson	2,155	2.78	+2.78
Outdoor Recreation	Chris Mateer	1,225	1.58	+1.58
	Doug Behn	1,216	1.57	+0.72
Citizens Electoral Council	Angela Griffiths	839	1.08	+0.93
Socialist Alliance	Tom Flanagan	460	0.59	+0.59
Total formal votes		77,633	95.77	+1.09
Informal votes		3,427	4.23	−1.09
Turnout		81,060	95.34	−0.37
Two-party-preferred result
National	Ian Causley	42,099	54.23	+1.46
Labor	Kevin Bell	35,534	45.77	−1.46
National hold		Swing	+1.46	

=== Parkes ===
This section is an excerpt from Electoral results for the Division of Parkes § 2004

2004 Australian federal election: Parkes
Party	Candidate	Votes	%	±%
National	John Cobb	45,569	60.49	+9.39
Labor	Joe Knagge	23,568	31.28	−1.93
Independent	Michael John Boland	2,904	3.85	+3.85
Greens	Terrance Loughlin	2,577	3.42	+0.89
Citizens Electoral Council	Makere Rangihaeata	717	0.95	+0.95
Total formal votes		75,335	96.05	−0.45
Informal votes		3,101	3.95	+0.45
Turnout		78,436	95.69	+0.12
Two-party-preferred result
National	John Cobb	48,512	64.40	+5.66
Labor	Joe Knagge	26,823	35.60	−5.66
National hold		Swing	+5.66	

=== Parramatta ===
This section is an excerpt from Electoral results for the Division of Parramatta § 2004

2004 Australian federal election: Parramatta
Party	Candidate	Votes	%	±%
Liberal	Ross Cameron	33,073	44.09	−1.85
Labor	Julie Owens	31,166	41.55	+0.14
Greens	Doug Williamson	3,973	5.30	+2.21
Christian Democrats	Sam Baissari	1,948	2.60	+1.07
Liberals for Forests	Mark Antony Guest	985	1.31	+1.31
One Nation	John Satchwell	859	1.15	−1.81
Democrats	Rob McFarlane	798	1.06	−2.35
Non-Custodial Parents	Alex Peniazev	777	1.04	+0.85
Family First	Andrew Markwell	674	0.90	+0.90
No GST	Simon Saad	581	0.77	+0.77
Save the ADI Site	Margaret Bloor	175	0.23	+0.23
Total formal votes		75,009	91.47	−2.32
Informal votes		6,996	8.53	+2.32
Turnout		82,005	94.13	+0.12
Two-party-preferred result
Labor	Julie Owens	38,083	50.77	+1.92
Liberal	Ross Cameron	36,926	49.23	−1.92
Labor gain from Liberal		Swing	+1.92	

=== Paterson ===
This section is an excerpt from Electoral results for the Division of Paterson § 2004

2004 Australian federal election: Paterson
Party	Candidate	Votes	%	±%
Liberal	Bob Baldwin	41,289	51.99	+12.08
Labor	Giovanna Kozary	28,633	36.05	−4.70
Greens	Aina Ranke	3,303	4.16	+1.44
One Nation	Charlie Griffith	1,417	1.78	−3.71
Veterans	Bruce McKenzie	987	1.24	+1.24
Fishing Party	Paul Hennelly	778	0.98	+0.05
Citizens Electoral Council	Tony King	727	0.92	+0.48
Family First	Larissa Robb	681	0.86	+0.86
Independent	Mike Tuffy	677	0.85	+0.85
Democrats	Brett Paterson	577	0.73	−1.84
Independent	Neil Smith	351	0.44	+0.44
Total formal votes		79,420	93.87	−2.52
Informal votes		5,183	6.13	+2.52
Turnout		84,603	96.08	−0.57
Two-party-preferred result
Liberal	Bob Baldwin	45,244	56.97	+5.55
Labor	Giovanna Kozary	34,178	43.03	−5.55
Liberal hold		Swing	+5.55	

=== Prospect ===
This section is an excerpt from Electoral results for the Division of Prospect § 2004

2004 Australian federal election: Prospect
Party	Candidate	Votes	%	±%
Labor	Chris Bowen	37,802	50.07	−5.29
Liberal	Robert Jacobucci	28,828	38.19	+10.54
Greens	Kelly Marks	4,009	5.31	+0.73
Christian Democrats	Manny Poularas	2,285	3.03	+0.47
One Nation	John Abromas	1,438	1.90	−2.60
Democrats	Lily Arthur	1,131	1.50	−0.79
Total formal votes		75,493	90.76	−0.25
Informal votes		7,906	9.24	+0.25
Turnout		83,183	95.03	−0.26
Two-party-preferred result
Labor	Chris Bowen	43,119	57.12	−5.69
Liberal	Robert Jacobucci	32,374	42.88	+5.69
Labor hold		Swing	−5.69	

=== Reid ===
This section is an excerpt from Electoral results for the Division of Reid § 2004

2004 Australian federal election: Reid
Party	Candidate	Votes	%	±%
Labor	Laurie Ferguson	33,052	51.37	−5.72
Liberal	Sarah McMahon	19,796	30.76	+8.28
Greens	Wafaa Salti	3,376	5.25	+2.24
No GST	Nicholas Khoury	3,084	4.79	+4.79
Christian Democrats	Kylie Laurence	2,296	3.57	+1.22
One Nation	Neville Williams	1,267	1.97	−3.47
Democrats	Tony Yoo	802	1.25	−2.17
Socialist Alliance	Lisa Macdonald	673	1.05	+1.05
Total formal votes		64,346	88.29	−0.63
Informal votes		8,537	11.71	+0.63
Turnout		72,883	92.95	−0.33
Two-party-preferred result
Labor	Laurie Ferguson	40,388	62.77	−4.10
Liberal	Sarah McMahon	23,958	37.23	+4.10
Labor hold		Swing	−4.10	

=== Richmond ===
This section is an excerpt from Electoral results for the Division of Richmond § 2004

2004 Australian federal election: Richmond
Party	Candidate	Votes	%	±%
National	Larry Anthony	36,095	45.79	+1.04
Labor	Justine Elliot	28,059	35.60	+1.60
Greens	Susanna Flower	9,751	12.37	+2.31
Family First	Craig Lees	1,626	2.06	+2.06
Liberals for Forests	Fiona Tyler	1,417	1.80	+1.80
Democrats	Timothy Winton-Brown	913	1.16	−1.71
Veterans	Allan Watt	617	0.78	+0.78
Nuclear Disarmament	Dean Jefferys	341	0.43	+0.43
Total formal votes		78,819	96.39	+1.74
Informal votes		2,951	3.61	−1.74
Turnout		81,770	94.68	+0.28
Two-party-preferred result
Labor	Justine Elliot	39,560	50.19	+1.87
National	Larry Anthony	39,259	49.81	−1.87
Labor gain from National		Swing	+1.74	

=== Riverina ===
This section is an excerpt from Electoral results for the Division of Riverina § 2004

2004 Australian federal election: Riverina
Party	Candidate	Votes	%	±%
National	Kay Hull	54,328	66.83	+5.38
Labor	Victoria Brooks	20,080	24.70	+0.70
Greens	Ray Goodlass	3,497	4.30	+1.87
One Nation	Neil Turner	3,389	4.17	−1.43
Total formal votes		81,294	96.44	+0.40
Informal votes		3,196	3.78	−0.40
Turnout		84,490	95.71	−0.23
Two-party-preferred result
National	Kay Hull	57,440	70.66	+0.79
Labor	Victoria Brooks	23,854	29.34	−0.79
National hold		Swing	+0.79	

=== Robertson ===
This section is an excerpt from Electoral results for the Division of Robertson § 2004

2004 Australian federal election: Robertson
Party	Candidate	Votes	%	±%
Liberal	Jim Lloyd	41,816	53.62	+2.82
Labor	Trish Moran	27,107	34.76	+0.68
Greens	Terry Jones	6,200	7.95	+4.63
One Nation	Don Parkes	1,344	1.72	−1.36
Family First	Carolyn Dorhauer	1,312	1.68	+1.68
Citizens Electoral Council	Nicholas Tomlin	211	0.27	+0.10
Total formal votes		77,990	95.61	+1.72
Informal votes		3,581	4.39	−1.72
Turnout		81,571	95.38	−0.17
Two-party-preferred result
Liberal	Jim Lloyd	44,308	56.81	−0.17
Labor	Trish Moran	33,682	43.19	+0.17
Liberal hold		Swing	−0.17	

=== Shortland ===
This section is an excerpt from Electoral results for the Division of Shortland § 2004

2004 Australian federal election: Shortland
Party	Candidate	Votes	%	±%
Labor	Jill Hall	40,069	49.91	+0.21
Liberal	Dell Tschanter	28,745	35.81	+1.14
Greens	Bob Phillips	6,333	7.89	+3.77
One Nation	Florence Roberts	2,113	2.63	−2.05
Family First	Brian Dixon	1,804	2.25	+2.25
Democrats	Peter Lee	1,211	1.51	−1.64
Total formal votes		80,275	95.38	−0.06
Informal votes		3,884	4.62	+0.06
Turnout		84,159	95.54	−0.12
Two-party-preferred result
Labor	Jill Hall	47,754	59.49	+0.71
Liberal	Dell Tschanter	32,521	40.51	−0.71
Labor hold		Swing	+0.71	

=== Sydney ===
This section is an excerpt from Electoral results for the Division of Sydney § 2004

2004 Australian federal election: Sydney
Party	Candidate	Votes	%	±%
Labor	Tanya Plibersek	36,766	44.68	+0.35
Liberal	Michael Shevers	23,419	28.46	−1.64
Greens	Jenny Leong	17,784	21.61	+6.92
Democrats	Michelle Bleicher	1,701	2.07	−8.81
Independent	Jane Ward	1,346	1.64	+1.64
Socialist Alliance	Susan Price	564	0.69	+0.69
Independent	Michael Webb	553	0.67	+0.67
Citizens Electoral Council	Adrian Ford	150	0.18	+0.18
Total formal votes		82,283	94.71	−1.05
Informal votes		4,600	5.29	+1.05
Turnout		86,883	91.61	+1.37
Two-party-preferred result
Labor	Tanya Plibersek	54,656	66.42	+1.38
Liberal	Michael Shevers	27,627	33.58	−1.38
Labor hold		Swing	+1.38	

=== Throsby ===
This section is an excerpt from Electoral results for the Division of Throwsby § 2004

2004 Australian federal election: Throsby
Party	Candidate	Votes	%	±%
Labor	Jennie George	44,495	56.26	+1.36
Liberal	Linda Nelson	24,519	31.00	+5.78
Greens	Trevor Jones	7,995	10.11	+5.61
Democrats	Madeleine Roberts	2,078	2.63	−4.88
Total formal votes		79,087	94.47	−0.34
Informal votes		4,629	5.53	+0.34
Turnout		83,716	95.87	+0.36
Two-party-preferred result
Labor	Jennie George	51,407	65.00	−0.10
Liberal	Linda Nelson	27,680	35.00	+0.10
Labor hold		Swing	−0.10	

=== Warringah ===
This section is an excerpt from Electoral results for the Division of Warringah § 2004

2004 Australian federal election: Warringah
Party	Candidate	Votes	%	±%
Liberal	Tony Abbott	40,798	54.53	+3.08
Labor	Linda Beattie	19,181	25.64	+13.56
Greens	Ian Hehir	8,833	11.81	+8.12
Independent	Patricia Petersen	1,914	2.56	+2.56
One Nation	David Kelly	1,142	1.53	−0.21
Family First	Phil McPherson	1,023	1.37	+1.37
Fishing Party	Edward Kelly	618	0.83	+0.83
Independent	Dian Maie Underwood	524	0.70	+0.70
Independent	Peter Thyer	471	0.63	+0.63
Independent	Neil Francey	312	0.42	+0.42
Total formal votes		74,816	94.11	−2.61
Informal votes		4,684	5.89	+2.61
Turnout		79,500	93.15	−0.54
Two-party-preferred result
Liberal	Tony Abbott	45,250	60.48	−2.18
Labor	Linda Beattie	29,566	39.52	+2.18
Liberal hold		Swing	−2.18	

=== Watson ===
This section is an excerpt from Electoral results for the Division of Watson § 2004

2004 Australian federal election: Watson
Party	Candidate	Votes	%	±%
Labor	Tony Burke	39,046	56.65	+0.50
Liberal	Keith Topolski	21,723	31.52	+3.40
Greens	Kali Reid	4,667	6.77	+3.29
Family First	Cat Cannone	1,150	1.67	+1.67
One Nation	John Coleman	1,093	1.59	−1.49
Democrats	Garry Dalrymple	914	1.33	−2.63
	Ron Poulsen	335	0.49	+0.03
Total formal votes		68,928	90.90	−1.58
Informal votes		6,898	9.10	+1.58
Turnout		75,826	92.68	−0.17
Two-party-preferred result
Labor	Tony Burke	44,899	65.14	−2.17
Liberal	Keith Topolski	24,029	34.86	+2.17
Labor hold		Swing	−2.17	

=== Wentworth ===
This section is an excerpt from Electoral results for the Division of Wentworth § 2004

2004 Australian federal election: Wentworth
Party	Candidate	Votes	%	±%
Liberal	Malcolm Turnbull	30,771	41.79	−10.29
Labor	David Patch	19,391	26.34	−3.18
Independent	Peter King	13,236	17.98	+17.98
Greens	Mithra Cox	8,210	11.15	+1.38
Democrats	Lindy Morrison	683	0.93	−5.22
Independent	Robert Vogler	339	0.46	+0.46
Family First	Leonie Hull	301	0.41	+0.41
Fishing Party	Victor Shen	239	0.32	+0.32
Independent	Pat Sheil	218	0.30	+0.30
No GST	Brian Buckley	171	0.23	+0.23
Citizens Electoral Council	John Jamieson	65	0.09	+0.09
Total formal votes		73,624	93.82	−1.33
Informal votes		4,853	6.18	+1.33
Turnout		78,477	92.34	+0.61
Two-party-preferred result
Liberal	Malcolm Turnbull	40,847	55.48	−2.38
Labor	David Patch	32,777	44.52	+2.38
Liberal hold		Swing	−2.38	

=== Werriwa ===
This section is an excerpt from Electoral results for the Division of Werriwa § 2004

2004 Australian federal election: Werriwa
Party	Candidate	Votes	%	±%
Labor	Mark Latham	40,837	52.64	+2.31
Liberal	Michael Medway	27,241	35.11	+1.79
Independent	Sam Bargshoon	3,779	4.87	+4.87
Greens	Ben Raue	2,432	3.13	+0.48
One Nation	Charles Doggett	1,831	2.36	−2.36
Democrats	Patrick Briscoe-Hough	965	1.24	−1.40
	Mike Head	497	0.64	+0.64
Total formal votes		77,582	92.02	+0.53
Informal votes		6,724	7.98	−0.53
Turnout		84,306	93.92	−0.05
Two-party-preferred result
Labor	Mark Latham	46,012	59.31	+0.82
Liberal	Michael Medway	31,570	40.69	−0.82
Labor hold		Swing	+0.82	

== See also ==
- Members of the Australian House of Representatives, 2004–2007
