= Electoral results for the Division of Watson =

Australian division election results

== Members ==
| Member | Party | Term |
|---|---|---|
| Leo McLeay | Labor | 1993–2004 |
| Tony Burke | Labor | 2004–present |

== Election results ==
=== Elections in the 2020s ===
==== 2025 ====
2025 Australian federal election: Watson
| Party | Candidate | Votes | % | ±% |
|---|---|---|---|---|
| Labor | Tony Burke | | | |
| Libertarian | Vanessa Hadchiti | | | |
| Independent | Ziad Basyouny | | | |
| Independent | Zain Khan | | | |
| One Nation | Elisha Trevena | | | |
| Liberal | Zakir Alam | | | |
| Family First | John Mannah | | | |
| Greens | Jocelyn Brewer | | | |
| Trumpet of Patriots | John Koukoulis | | | |
| Total formal votes | | | | |
| Informal votes | | | | |
| Turnout | | | | |

==== 2022 ====
2022 Australian federal election: Watson
| Party | Candidate | Votes | % | ±% |
|---|---|---|---|---|
| Labor | Tony Burke | 44,464 | 51.87 | +0.18 |
| Liberal | Sazeda Akter | 22,759 | 26.55 | −2.85 |
| Greens | Bradley Schott | 8,200 | 9.57 | +2.47 |
| United Australia | John Koukoulis | 6,126 | 7.15 | +2.94 |
| One Nation | Alan Jorgensen | 4,178 | 4.87 | +4.87 |
| Total formal votes | | 85,727 | 90.27 | +2.88 |
| Informal votes | | 9,245 | 9.73 | −2.88 |
| Turnout | | 94,972 | 87.36 | −2.09 |
Two-party-preferred result
| Labor | Tony Burke | 55,810 | 65.10 | +1.58 |
| Liberal | Sazeda Akter | 29,917 | 34.90 | −1.58 |
| Labor hold | | Swing | +1.58 | |

Alluvial diagram for preference flows in the seat of Watson in the 2022 federal election. The winning candidate got over 50% of first preference votes, so this alluvial diagram is indicative only, and preference flows were not used to determine the final result. The preference flows were used to determine the two-candidate-preferred.

=== Elections in the 2010s ===
==== 2019 ====
2019 Australian federal election: Watson
| Party | Candidate | Votes | % | ±% |
|---|---|---|---|---|
| Labor | Tony Burke | 43,550 | 51.69 | −3.70 |
| Liberal | Mohammad Zaman | 24,769 | 29.40 | +4.01 |
| Greens | Emmet de Bhaldraithe | 5,982 | 7.10 | +0.43 |
| Christian Democrats | Karl Schubert | 4,522 | 5.37 | −4.19 |
| United Australia | Dean Wrightson | 3,549 | 4.21 | +4.21 |
| Science | Raymond Zeng | 1,878 | 2.23 | +0.29 |
| Total formal votes | | 84,250 | 87.39 | −1.96 |
| Informal votes | | 12,159 | 12.61 | +1.96 |
| Turnout | | 96,409 | 89.45 | +1.08 |
Two-party-preferred result
| Labor | Tony Burke | 53,518 | 63.52 | −4.06 |
| Liberal | Mohammad Zaman | 30,732 | 36.48 | +4.06 |
| Labor hold | | Swing | −4.06 | |

==== 2016 ====
2016 Australian federal election: Watson
| Party | Candidate | Votes | % | ±% |
|---|---|---|---|---|
| Labor | Tony Burke | 46,105 | 55.39 | +4.84 |
| Liberal | Mohammad Zaman | 21,133 | 25.39 | −11.22 |
| Christian Democrats | Violet Abdulla | 7,957 | 9.56 | +7.19 |
| Greens | Barbara Bloch | 5,555 | 6.67 | +0.40 |
| Science | Tom Gordon | 1,611 | 1.94 | +1.94 |
| Online Direct Democracy | Paul Geran | 875 | 1.05 | +1.05 |
| Total formal votes | | 83,236 | 89.35 | +3.24 |
| Informal votes | | 9,924 | 10.65 | −3.24 |
| Turnout | | 93,160 | 88.37 | −3.05 |
Two-party-preferred result
| Labor | Tony Burke | 56,247 | 67.58 | +8.76 |
| Liberal | Mohammad Zaman | 26,989 | 32.42 | −8.76 |
| Labor hold | | Swing | +8.76 | |

==== 2013 ====
2013 Australian federal election: Watson
| Party | Candidate | Votes | % | ±% |
|---|---|---|---|---|
| Labor | Tony Burke | 39,126 | 49.51 | −0.92 |
| Liberal | Ron Delezio | 30,617 | 38.74 | +1.57 |
| Greens | Barbara Bloch | 4,171 | 5.28 | −4.34 |
| Palmer United | Zaher Nasser | 1,970 | 2.49 | +2.49 |
| Christian Democrats | David Fraser | 1,873 | 2.37 | +2.37 |
| Democratic Labour | Stephen Rawson | 897 | 1.14 | +1.14 |
| Rise Up Australia | Paul Kamlade | 376 | 0.48 | +0.48 |
| Total formal votes | | 79,030 | 86.05 | −1.15 |
| Informal votes | | 12,814 | 13.95 | +1.15 |
| Turnout | | 91,844 | 90.64 | +0.60 |
Two-party-preferred result
| Labor | Tony Burke | 44,895 | 56.81 | −2.33 |
| Liberal | Ron Delezio | 34,135 | 43.19 | +2.33 |
| Labor hold | | Swing | −2.33 | |

==== 2010 ====
2010 Australian federal election: Watson
| Party | Candidate | Votes | % | ±% |
|---|---|---|---|---|
| Labor | Tony Burke | 38,707 | 50.43 | −9.87 |
| Liberal | Ken Nam | 28,527 | 37.17 | +9.53 |
| Greens | Christine Donayre | 7,387 | 9.62 | +3.14 |
| Independent | Mark Sharma | 2,136 | 2.78 | +2.78 |
| Total formal votes | | 76,757 | 87.20 | −3.71 |
| Informal votes | | 11,265 | 12.80 | +3.71 |
| Turnout | | 88,022 | 90.03 | −2.21 |
Two-party-preferred result
| Labor | Tony Burke | 45,393 | 59.14 | −9.06 |
| Liberal | Ken Nam | 31,364 | 40.86 | +9.06 |
| Labor hold | | Swing | −9.06 | |

=== Elections in the 2000s ===
==== 2007 ====
2007 Australian federal election: Watson
| Party | Candidate | Votes | % | ±% |
|---|---|---|---|---|
| Labor | Tony Burke | 49,652 | 61.81 | +5.43 |
| Liberal | Philip Mansour | 20,957 | 26.09 | −5.54 |
| Greens | Christine Donayre | 5,302 | 6.60 | +0.22 |
| Family First | Merry Foy | 2,011 | 2.50 | +1.04 |
| Christian Democrats | Josephine Sammut | 1,988 | 2.47 | +1.89 |
| Communist League | Ronald Poulsen | 424 | 0.53 | +0.14 |
| Total formal votes | | 80,334 | 90.95 | +0.11 |
| Informal votes | | 7,997 | 9.05 | −0.11 |
| Turnout | | 88,331 | 93.31 | +0.44 |
Two-party-preferred result
| Labor | Tony Burke | 56,499 | 70.33 | +5.77 |
| Liberal | Philip Mansour | 23,835 | 29.67 | −5.77 |
| Labor hold | | Swing | +5.77 | |

==== 2004 ====
2004 Australian federal election: Watson
| Party | Candidate | Votes | % | ±% |
|---|---|---|---|---|
| Labor | Tony Burke | 39,046 | 56.65 | +0.50 |
| Liberal | Keith Topolski | 21,723 | 31.52 | +3.40 |
| Greens | Kali Reid | 4,667 | 6.77 | +3.29 |
| Family First | Cat Cannone | 1,150 | 1.67 | +1.67 |
| One Nation | John Coleman | 1,093 | 1.59 | −1.49 |
| Democrats | Garry Dalrymple | 914 | 1.33 | −2.63 |
| | Ron Poulsen | 335 | 0.49 | +0.03 |
| Total formal votes | | 68,928 | 90.90 | −1.58 |
| Informal votes | | 6,898 | 9.10 | +1.58 |
| Turnout | | 75,826 | 92.68 | −0.17 |
Two-party-preferred result
| Labor | Tony Burke | 44,899 | 65.14 | −2.17 |
| Liberal | Keith Topolski | 24,029 | 34.86 | +2.17 |
| Labor hold | | Swing | −2.17 | |

==== 2001 ====
2001 Australian federal election: Watson
| Party | Candidate | Votes | % | ±% |
|---|---|---|---|---|
| Labor | Leo McLeay | 39,516 | 56.15 | −1.07 |
| Liberal | Arnold Plooy | 19,791 | 28.12 | +1.73 |
| Unity | Ken Nam | 3,349 | 4.76 | −0.51 |
| Democrats | Kristin Griffiths | 2,788 | 3.96 | +0.80 |
| Greens | Dominic Fitzsimmons | 2,446 | 3.48 | +2.00 |
| One Nation | Michelle Farrell | 2,165 | 3.08 | −1.54 |
| | Ronald Poulsen | 322 | 0.46 | +0.46 |
| Total formal votes | | 70,377 | 92.48 | −2.41 |
| Informal votes | | 5,726 | 7.52 | +2.41 |
| Turnout | | 76,103 | 93.23 | |
Two-party-preferred result
| Labor | Leo McLeay | 47,374 | 67.31 | −0.31 |
| Liberal | Arnold Plooy | 23,003 | 32.69 | +0.31 |
| Labor hold | | Swing | −0.31 | |

=== Elections in the 1990s ===
==== 1998 ====
1998 Australian federal election: Watson
| Party | Candidate | Votes | % | ±% |
|---|---|---|---|---|
| Labor | Leo McLeay | 41,159 | 56.85 | +1.74 |
| Liberal | Joe Rafferty | 19,461 | 26.88 | −6.53 |
| Unity | Zahir Abdurahman | 3,838 | 5.30 | +5.30 |
| One Nation | Claire Wright | 3,392 | 4.68 | +4.68 |
| Democrats | Amelia Gavagnin Newman | 2,309 | 3.19 | −4.69 |
| Christian Democrats | Murray Peterson | 1,176 | 1.62 | −1.98 |
| Greens | Caroline Toomey | 1,070 | 1.48 | +1.48 |
| Total formal votes | | 72,405 | 95.02 | +0.14 |
| Informal votes | | 3,791 | 4.98 | −0.14 |
| Turnout | | 76,196 | 93.41 | −2.63 |
Two-party-preferred result
| Labor | Leo McLeay | 48,849 | 67.47 | +5.79 |
| Liberal | Joe Rafferty | 23,556 | 32.53 | −5.79 |
| Labor hold | | Swing | +5.79 | |

==== 1996 ====
1996 Australian federal election: Watson
| Party | Candidate | Votes | % | ±% |
|---|---|---|---|---|
| Labor | Leo McLeay | 39,329 | 55.11 | −4.45 |
| Liberal | Bruce Larter | 23,840 | 33.41 | +2.94 |
| Democrats | Amelia Newman | 5,625 | 7.88 | +4.37 |
| Call to Australia | Todd Rahme | 2,570 | 3.60 | +3.60 |
| Total formal votes | | 71,364 | 94.88 | −0.06 |
| Informal votes | | 3,851 | 5.12 | +0.06 |
| Turnout | | 75,215 | 96.05 | +0.58 |
Two-party-preferred result
| Labor | Leo McLeay | 43,913 | 61.68 | −3.16 |
| Liberal | Bruce Larter | 27,281 | 38.32 | +3.16 |
| Labor hold | | Swing | −3.16 | |

==== 1993 ====
1993 Australian federal election: Watson
| Party | Candidate | Votes | % | ±% |
|---|---|---|---|---|
| Labor | Leo McLeay | 41,701 | 59.56 | +9.74 |
| Liberal | Bernard O'Bree | 21,330 | 30.46 | −4.06 |
| Independent EFF | Col Harding | 2,499 | 3.57 | +3.57 |
| Democrats | Amelia Newman | 2,457 | 3.51 | −5.45 |
| Independent | George Tsirkas | 952 | 1.36 | +1.36 |
| Independent | Brian Meyer | 721 | 1.03 | +0.99 |
| Natural Law | M. Chaplin | 355 | 0.51 | +0.51 |
| Total formal votes | | 70,015 | 94.94 | +0.43 |
| Informal votes | | 3,732 | 5.06 | −0.43 |
| Turnout | | 73,747 | 95.47 | |
Two-party-preferred result
| Labor | Leo McLeay | 45,355 | 64.84 | +6.14 |
| Liberal | Bernard O'Bree | 24,593 | 35.16 | −6.14 |
| Labor notional hold | | Swing | +6.14 | |
