= Electoral results for the Division of Berowra =

Australian division election results

This is a list of electoral results for the Division of Berowra in Australian federal elections from the division's creation in 1969 until the present.

== Members ==
Member	Party	Term
Tom Hughes	Liberal	1969–1972
Harry Edwards	Liberal	1972–1993
Philip Ruddock	Liberal	1993–2016
Julian Leeser	Liberal	2016–present

== Election results ==
=== Elections in the 2020s ===
==== 2025 ====
2025 Australian federal election: Berowra
Party	Candidate	Votes	%	±%
Liberal	Julian Leeser	48,210	41.72	−5.47
Labor	Benson Koschinski	31,220	27.01	+3.19
Greens	Martin Cousins	13,781	11.92	−2.97
Independent	Tina Brown	13,135	11.37	+11.37
One Nation	Gerald Mattinson	4,705	4.07	+1.20
Trumpet of Patriots	Stephen Bastian	2,199	1.90	+1.48
Independent	Roger Woodward	1,236	1.07	+0.34
Fusion	Brendan Clarke	1,082	0.94	−0.45
Total formal votes		115,568	93.61	−0.65
Informal votes		7,892	6.39	+0.65
Turnout		123,460	94.34	+2.03
Two-party-preferred result
Liberal	Julian Leeser	59,673	51.63	−5.93
Labor	Benson Koschinski	55,895	48.37	+5.93
Liberal hold		Swing	−5.93	

==== 2022 ====
2022 Australian federal election: Berowra
Party	Candidate	Votes	%	±%
Liberal	Julian Leeser	45,797	49.08	−8.12
Labor	Benson Koschinski	20,746	22.23	+1.13
Greens	Tania Salitra	14,536	15.58	+3.70
One Nation	Rhiannon Bosma	2,972	3.19	+3.19
United Australia	Christopher Martinic	2,315	2.48	+0.80
Liberal Democrats	Nicholas Samios	2,307	2.47	+2.47
Independent	Benjamin Caswell	1,802	1.93	+1.93
Fusion	Brendan Clarke	1,418	1.52	+1.52
Independent	Roger Woodward	904	0.97	+0.44
Federation	David Louie	509	0.55	+0.55
Total formal votes		93,306	93.88	+0.28
Informal votes		6,083	6.12	−0.28
Turnout		99,389	93.61	−0.78
Two-party-preferred result
Liberal	Julian Leeser	55,771	59.77	−5.88
Labor	Benson Koschinski	37,535	40.23	+5.88
Liberal hold		Swing	−5.88	

Alluvial diagram for preference flows in the seat of Berowra in the 2022 federal election. indicates at what stage the winning candidate had over 50% of the votes and was declared the winner.

=== Elections in the 2010s ===
==== 2019 ====
2019 Australian federal election: Berowra
Party	Candidate	Votes	%	±%
Liberal	Julian Leeser	53,741	57.20	+0.11
Labor	Katie Gompertz	19,821	21.10	+1.22
Greens	Monica Tan	11,157	11.88	+0.38
Christian Democrats	Simon Taylor	2,163	2.30	−3.24
Independent	Mick Gallagher	2,104	2.24	−0.80
United Australia	Craig McLachlan	1,576	1.68	+1.68
Science	Brendan Clarke	1,465	1.56	−0.50
Sustainable Australia	Justin Thomas	1,425	1.52	+1.52
Independent	Roger Woodward	495	0.53	−0.35
Total formal votes		93,947	93.60	−2.24
Informal votes		6,423	6.40	+2.24
Turnout		100,370	94.39	+1.18
Two-party-preferred result
Liberal	Julian Leeser	61,675	65.65	−0.80
Labor	Katie Gompertz	32,272	34.35	+0.80
Liberal hold		Swing	−0.80	

==== 2016 ====
2016 Australian federal election: Berowra
Party	Candidate	Votes	%	±%
Liberal	Julian Leeser	53,678	57.09	−4.39
Labor	Josh Andrews	18,693	19.88	+0.85
Greens	Emma Heyde	10,815	11.50	+1.47
Christian Democrats	Leighton Thew	5,213	5.54	+3.05
Independent	Mick Gallagher	2,859	3.04	−0.62
Science	Brendan Clarke	1,933	2.06	+2.06
Independent	Roger Woodward	826	0.88	+0.88
Total formal votes		94,017	95.84	+1.44
Informal votes		4,082	4.16	−1.44
Turnout		98,099	93.21	−3.83
Two-party-preferred result
Liberal	Julian Leeser	62,470	66.45	−2.60
Labor	Josh Andrews	31,547	33.55	+2.60
Liberal hold		Swing	−2.60	

==== 2013 ====
2013 Australian federal election: Berowra
Party	Candidate	Votes	%	±%
Liberal	Philip Ruddock	53,236	61.44	+1.46
Labor	Michael Stove	16,402	18.93	−3.12
Greens	John Storey	8,684	10.02	−1.37
Independent	Mick Gallagher	3,374	3.89	+1.03
Palmer United	Paul Graves	2,324	2.68	+2.68
Christian Democrats	Leighton Thew	2,135	2.46	−0.28
Stable Population	Deborah Smythe	492	0.57	+0.57
Total formal votes		86,647	94.45	−0.96
Informal votes		5,096	5.55	+0.96
Turnout		91,743	94.56	+0.11
Two-party-preferred result
Liberal	Philip Ruddock	59,847	69.07	+2.87
Labor	Michael Stove	26,800	30.93	−2.87
Liberal hold		Swing	+2.87	

==== 2010 ====
2010 Australian federal election: Berowra
Party	Candidate	Votes	%	±%
Liberal	Philip Ruddock	51,416	59.98	+5.44
Labor	Michael Stove	18,901	22.05	−7.88
Greens	Toni Wright-Turner	9,762	11.39	+2.57
Independent	Mick Gallagher	2,455	2.86	+1.27
Christian Democrats	Steve Evans	2,350	2.74	+0.21
Family First	Christian Ellis	840	0.98	−0.28
Total formal votes		85,724	95.41	+0.09
Informal votes		4,123	4.59	−0.09
Turnout		89,847	94.46	−0.89
Two-party-preferred result
Liberal	Philip Ruddock	56,752	66.20	+6.19
Labor	Michael Stove	28,972	33.80	−6.19
Liberal hold		Swing	+6.19	

=== Elections in the 2000s ===
==== 2007 ====
2007 Australian federal election: Berowra
Party	Candidate	Votes	%	±%
Liberal	Philip Ruddock	44,525	53.42	−4.38
Labor	Michael Colnan	25,563	30.67	+5.71
Greens	Wendy McMurdo	7,653	9.18	+0.00
Christian Democrats	Ray Levick	2,125	2.55	−0.52
Independent	Mick Gallagher	1,456	1.75	+1.75
Family First	Sam Ellis	1,049	1.26	+0.15
Democrats	Rob McFarlane	974	1.17	−0.65
Total formal votes		83,345	95.22	+0.89
Informal votes		4,188	4.78	−0.89
Turnout		87,533	95.47	+0.10
Two-party-preferred result
Liberal	Philip Ruddock	49,122	58.94	−4.88
Labor	Michael Colnan	34,223	41.06	+4.88
Liberal hold		Swing	−4.88	

==== 2004 ====
2004 Australian federal election: Berowra
Party	Candidate	Votes	%	±%
Liberal	Philip Ruddock	43,674	56.14	−2.43
Labor	Michael Colnan	20,351	26.16	+3.35
Greens	Erland Merlin Howden	7,465	9.60	+4.42
Christian Democrats	Bruce Coleman	2,411	3.10	+1.00
Democrats	Margaret van de Weg	1,457	1.87	−4.62
Family First	Lance Clark	883	1.14	+1.14
Independent	Matthew Benson	860	1.11	+1.11
Independent	Ross Blade	694	0.89	+0.89
Total formal votes		77,795	94.41	−1.23
Informal votes		4,606	5.59	+1.23
Turnout		82,401	94.63	−0.22
Two-party-preferred result
Liberal	Philip Ruddock	48,358	62.16	−3.49
Labor	Michael Colnan	29,437	37.84	+3.49
Liberal hold		Swing	−3.49	

==== 2001 ====
2001 Australian federal election: Berowra
Party	Candidate	Votes	%	±%
Liberal	Philip Ruddock	45,575	58.57	+4.10
Labor	Richard Slater	17,748	22.81	−3.94
Democrats	Philip Sparks	5,047	6.49	−0.04
Greens	Maureen Gale	4,029	5.18	+1.98
Christian Democrats	Owen Nannelli	1,632	2.10	−0.25
One Nation	Harry Ball	1,537	1.98	−4.37
Unity	Daniel Choi	1,124	1.44	+1.11
No GST	P J Gallagher	1,117	1.44	+1.44
Total formal votes		77,809	95.64	−1.28
Informal votes		3,544	4.36	+1.28
Turnout		81,353	95.18	
Two-party-preferred result
Liberal	Philip Ruddock	51,078	65.65	+2.28
Labor	Richard Slater	26,731	34.35	−2.28
Liberal hold		Swing	+2.28	

=== Elections in the 1990s ===
==== 1998 ====
1998 Australian federal election: Berowra
Party	Candidate	Votes	%	±%
Liberal	Philip Ruddock	43,180	54.36	−4.24
Labor	Nola McCarroll	21,763	27.40	+5.84
Democrats	Bernard Teuben	5,255	6.62	−0.82
One Nation	Wayne Stewart	4,788	6.03	+6.03
Greens	Andrew Burke	2,561	3.22	+0.05
Christian Democrats	Owen Nannelli	1,893	2.38	+2.38
Total formal votes		79,440	96.96	−0.23
Informal votes		2,492	3.04	+0.23
Turnout		81,932	95.17	−1.42
Two-party-preferred result
Liberal	Philip Ruddock	50,457	63.52	−4.88
Labor	Nola McCarroll	28,983	36.48	+4.88
Liberal hold		Swing	−4.88	

==== 1996 ====
1996 Australian federal election: Berowra
Party	Candidate	Votes	%	±%
Liberal	Philip Ruddock	45,310	58.60	+3.38
Labor	Nola McCarroll	16,666	21.55	−7.23
Democrats	Simon Disney	5,751	7.44	+7.44
Independent	Mick Gallagher	5,034	6.51	−7.99
Greens	Christopher Connolly	2,453	3.17	+3.17
AAFI	Steve Martin van Wyk	1,964	2.54	+2.54
Natural Law	Bill Scally	143	0.18	−1.31
Total formal votes		77,321	97.19	−0.26
Informal votes		2,233	2.81	+0.26
Turnout		79,554	96.59	+0.26
Two-party-preferred result
Liberal	Philip Ruddock	52,526	68.40	+6.20
Labor	Nola McCarroll	24,268	31.60	−6.20
Liberal hold		Swing	+6.20	

==== 1993 ====
1993 Australian federal election: Berowra
Party	Candidate	Votes	%	±%
Liberal	Philip Ruddock	41,230	55.22	+3.44
Labor	Sue Deane	21,492	28.78	+3.19
Independent	Mick Gallagher	10,828	14.50	+12.15
Natural Law	Timothy Carr	1,116	1.49	+1.49
Total formal votes		74,666	97.45	−0.32
Informal votes		1,954	2.55	+0.32
Turnout		76,620	96.33	
Two-party-preferred result
Liberal	Philip Ruddock	46,433	62.20	−0.05
Labor	Sue Deane	28,216	37.80	+0.05
Liberal hold		Swing	−0.05	

==== 1990 ====
1990 Australian federal election: Berowra
Party	Candidate	Votes	%	±%
Liberal	Harry Edwards	34,720	52.4	−10.0
Labor	Sue Deane	16,089	24.3	−3.8
Democrats	Martyn Yeomans	11,070	16.7	+7.2
Independent	Mick Gallagher	2,103	3.2	+3.2
Call to Australia	Benille Varidel	1,471	2.2	+2.2
Independent	Les Paul	837	1.3	+1.3
Total formal votes		66,290	97.7	
Informal votes		1,572	2.3	
Turnout		67,862	95.8	
Two-party-preferred result
Liberal	Harry Edwards	41,466	62.8	−3.9
Labor	Sue Deane	24,592	37.2	+3.9
Liberal hold		Swing	−3.9	

=== Elections in the 1980s ===
==== 1987 ====
1987 Australian federal election: Berowra
Party	Candidate	Votes	%	±%
Liberal	Harry Edwards	40,288	62.4	+2.2
Labor	Sue Deane	18,173	28.1	−2.5
Democrats	Peter Markham	6,122	9.5	+0.2
Total formal votes		64,583	96.7	
Informal votes		2,204	3.3	
Turnout		66,787	94.4	
Two-party-preferred result
Liberal	Harry Edwards	43,045	66.7	+1.9
Labor	Sue Deane	21,535	33.3	−1.9
Liberal hold		Swing	+1.9	

==== 1984 ====
1984 Australian federal election: Berowra
Party	Candidate	Votes	%	±%
Liberal	Harry Edwards	37,545	60.2	−0.9
Labor	Rodney Berry	19,092	30.6	+0.6
Democrats	Chris Rogers	5,777	9.3	+0.4
Total formal votes		62,414	95.9	
Informal votes		2,656	4.1	
Turnout		65,070	93.8	
Two-party-preferred result
Liberal	Harry Edwards	40,468	64.8	+0.1
Labor	Rodney Berry	21,946	35.2	−0.1
Liberal hold		Swing	+0.1	

==== 1983 ====
1983 Australian federal election: Berowra
Party	Candidate	Votes	%	±%
Liberal	Harry Edwards	40,676	60.1	−1.3
Labor	Maurice Marshan	20,943	31.0	+1.5
Democrats	Pamela Tuckwell	6,015	8.9	−0.2
Total formal votes		67,634	98.3	
Informal votes		1,166	1.7	
Turnout		68,800	95.5	
Two-party-preferred result
Liberal	Harry Edwards	43,209	63.89	−1.11
Labor	Maurice Marshan	24,425	36.11	+1.11
Liberal hold		Swing	−1.11	

==== 1980 ====
1980 Australian federal election: Berowra
Party	Candidate	Votes	%	±%
Liberal	Harry Edwards	39,993	61.4	−1.5
Labor	George Bennett	19,235	29.5	+5.0
Democrats	James Boow	5,939	9.1	−2.4
Total formal votes		65,167	98.2	
Informal votes		1,201	1.8	
Turnout		66,368	94.6	
Two-party-preferred result
Liberal	Harry Edwards		65.0	−4.6
Labor	George Bennett		35.0	+4.6
Liberal hold		Swing	−4.6	

=== Elections in the 1970s ===
==== 1977 ====
1977 Australian federal election: Berowra
Party	Candidate	Votes	%	±%
Liberal	Harry Edwards	39,350	62.9	−4.7
Labor	Michael Jones	15,325	24.5	−4.3
Democrats	Johannes van Aggele	7,207	11.5	+11.5
Progress	George Simpson	686	1.1	−2.5
Total formal votes		62,568	98.3	
Informal votes		1,069	1.7	
Turnout		63,637	96.2	
Two-party-preferred result
Liberal	Harry Edwards		69.6	−0.9
Labor	Michael Jones		30.4	+0.9
Liberal hold		Swing	−0.9	

==== 1975 ====
1975 Australian federal election: Berowra
Party	Candidate	Votes	%	±%
Liberal	Harry Edwards	45,355	68.4	+5.9
Labor	Michael Ross	18,530	28.0	−4.2
Workers	Robert Howard	2,406	3.6	+3.6
Total formal votes		66,291	98.7	
Informal votes		876	1.3	
Turnout		67,167	97.4	
Two-party-preferred result
Liberal	Harry Edwards		71.3	+6.6
Labor	Michael Ross		28.7	−6.6
Liberal hold		Swing	+6.6	

==== 1974 ====
1974 Australian federal election: Berowra
Party	Candidate	Votes	%	±%
Liberal	Harry Edwards	39,511	62.5	+9.0
Labor	George Williams	20,363	32.2	−2.2
Australia	Patricia Wallace	3,386	5.4	−3.0
Total formal votes		63,260	98.9	
Informal votes		686	1.1	
Turnout		63,946	95.5	
Two-party-preferred result
Liberal	Harry Edwards		64.7	+4.9
Labor	George Williams		35.3	−4.9
Liberal hold		Swing	+4.9	

==== 1972 ====
1972 Australian federal election: Berowra
Party	Candidate	Votes	%	±%
Liberal	Harry Edwards	29,993	53.5	+8.0
Labor	George Williams	19,260	34.4	+3.8
Australia	David Haig	4,733	8.4	+1.5
Democratic Labor	Michael Strenger	2,055	3.7	−0.9
Total formal votes		56,041	98.8	
Informal votes		693	1.2	
Turnout		56,734	95.5	
Two-party-preferred result
Liberal	Harry Edwards		59.8	+0.3
Labor	George Williams		40.2	−0.3
Liberal hold		Swing	+0.3	

=== Elections in the 1960s ===
==== 1969 ====
1969 Australian federal election: Berowra
Party	Candidate	Votes	%	±%
Liberal	Tom Hughes	22,495	45.5	−20.4
Labor	George Williams	15,108	30.6	+7.3
Independent	Edith Parrish	6,095	12.3	+12.3
Australia	David Haig	3,401	6.9	+6.9
Democratic Labor	Neil Mackerras	2,288	4.6	+4.6
Total formal votes		49,387	97.9	
Informal votes		1,034	2.1	
Turnout		50.421	94.2	
Two-party-preferred result
Liberal	Tom Hughes		59.5	−13.0
Labor	George Williams		40.5	+13.0
Liberal notional hold		Swing	−13.0	
