= Electoral results for the district of Wollongong-Kembla =

Election results for Wollongong-Kembla, New South Wales, Australia

Wollongong-Kembla, an electoral district of the Legislative Assembly in the Australian state of New South Wales was created in 1941 and abolished in 1968.

Election	Member	Party
1941	Billy Davies	Labor
1944	Billy Davies	Labor
1947	Billy Davies	Labor
1950 by	Baden Powell	Labor
1950	Rex Connor	Labor
1953	Rex Connor	Labor
1956	Rex Connor	Labor
1959	Rex Connor	Labor
1962	Rex Connor	Labor
1964 by	Doug Porter	Labor
1965	Jack Hough	Liberal

== Election results ==
=== Elections in the 1960s ===
==== 1965 ====
1965 New South Wales state election: Wollongong−Kembla
Party	Candidate	Votes	%	±%
Labor	Doug Porter	9,805	46.7	−11.8
Liberal	Jack Hough	9,539	45.4	+3.9
Independent	Andrew Gibson	903	4.3	+4.3
Independent	Peter Barnes	760	3.6	+3.6
Total formal votes		21,007	97.2	−1.2
Informal votes		613	2.8	+1.2
Turnout		21,620	94.8	−1.2
Two-party-preferred result
Liberal	Jack Hough	10,697	50.9	+9.4
Labor	Doug Porter	10,310	49.1	−9.4
Liberal gain from Labor		Swing	+9.4	

==== 1964 by-election ====
1964 Wollongong-Kembla by-election Saturday 29 February
Party	Candidate	Votes	%	±%
Labor	Doug Porter	9,641	50.5	−8.0
Liberal	Jack Hough	9,441	49.5	+8.0
Total formal votes		19,082	97.4	−1.0
Informal votes		512	2.6	+1.0
Turnout		19,594	85.4	−8.2
Labor hold		Swing	−8.2	

Rex Connor (Labor) resigned.

==== 1962 ====
1962 New South Wales state election: Wollongong−Kembla
Party	Candidate	Votes	%	±%
Labor	Rex Connor	12,236	58.5	+0.1
Liberal	Jack Hough	8,698	41.5	−0.1
Total formal votes		20,934	98.4	
Informal votes		344	1.6	
Turnout		21,278	93.6	
Labor hold		Swing	+0.1	

=== Elections in the 1950s ===
==== 1959 ====
1959 New South Wales state election: Wollongong−Kembla
Party	Candidate	Votes	%	±%
Labor	Rex Connor	11,515	58.4	
Liberal	Jack Hough	8,211	41.6	
Total formal votes		19,726	97.6	
Informal votes		475	2.4	
Turnout		20,201	93.7	
Labor hold		Swing		

==== 1956 ====
1956 New South Wales state election: Wollongong−Kembla
Party	Candidate	Votes	%	±%
Labor	Rex Connor	9,636	55.2	+0.3
Liberal	Robert Albert	6,027	34.5	+34.5
Independent	George Parker	1,785	10.2	−30.4
Total formal votes		17,448	98.3	+1.4
Informal votes		293	1.7	−1.4
Turnout		17,741	93.7	−0.9
Two-party-preferred result
Labor	Rex Connor	10,528	60.3	+4.3
Liberal	Robert Albert	6,920	39.7	+39.7
Labor hold		Swing	N/A	

==== 1953 ====
1953 New South Wales state election: Wollongong-Kembla
Party	Candidate	Votes	%	±%
Labor	Rex Connor	9,073	54.9	
Independent	George Parker	6,722	40.6	
Communist	William Harkness	740	4.5	
Total formal votes		16,535	96.9	
Informal votes		524	3.1	
Turnout		17,059	94.6	
Two-candidate-preferred result
Labor	Rex Connor	9,443	57.1	
Independent	George Parker	7,092	42.9	
Labor hold		Swing		

==== 1950 ====
1950 New South Wales state election: Wollongong-Kembla
Party	Candidate	Votes	%	±%
Labor	Rex Connor	7,808	47.9	
Liberal	Gerald Sargent	6,520	40.0	
Independent	Henry Graham	1,982	12.2	
Total formal votes		16,310	98.6	
Informal votes		234	1.4	
Turnout		16,544	95.2	
Two-party-preferred result
Labor	Rex Connor	8,484	52.0	
Liberal	Gerald Sargent	7,826	48.0	
Labor hold		Swing		

==== 1950 by-election ====
1950 Wollongong-Kembla by-election Saturday 11 February
Party	Candidate	Votes	%	±%
Labor	Baden Powell	7,674	50.9	
Liberal	Gerald Sargent	7,413	49.1	
Total formal votes		15,087	98.5	
Informal votes		230	1.5	
Turnout		15,317	87.4	
Liberal hold		Swing	N/A	

Billy Davies (Labor) resigned to successfully contest the 1949 election for Cunningham.

=== Elections in the 1940s ===
==== 1947 ====
1947 New South Wales state election: Wollongong-Kembla
Party	Candidate	Votes	%	±%
Labor	Billy Davies	unopposed		
Labor hold				

==== 1944 ====
1944 New South Wales state election: Wollongong-Kembla
Party	Candidate	Votes	%	±%
Labor	Billy Davies	unopposed		
Labor hold				

==== 1941 ====
1941 New South Wales state election: Wollongong-Kembla
Party	Candidate	Votes	%	±%
Labor	Billy Davies	11,638	82.3	
State Labor	William Frame	2,511	17.7	
Total formal votes		14,149	95.0	
Informal votes		737	5.0	
Turnout		14,886	93.1	
Labor notional hold		Swing		
