= Electoral results for the Division of Cunningham =

Australian division election results

This is a list of electoral results for the Division of Cunningham in Australian federal elections from the division's creation in 1949 until the present.

== Members ==
Member	Party	Years
Billy Davies	Labor	1949–1956
Victor Kearney	Labor	1956–1963
Rex Connor	Labor	1963–1977
Stewart West	Labor	1977–1993
Stephen Martin	Labor	1993–2002
Michael Organ	Greens	2002–2004
Sharon Bird	Labor	2004–2022
Alison Byrnes	Labor	2022–present

== Election results ==
=== Elections in the 2020s ===
==== 2025 ====
2025 Australian federal election: Cunningham
Party	Candidate	Votes	%	±%
Labor	Alison Byrnes			
Citizens	Alexis Garnaut-Miller			
Liberal	Amanda Ivaneza			
One Nation	John Fuller			
Animal Justice	Tim Lavers			
Greens	Jess Whittaker			
Total formal votes				
Informal votes				
Turnout				

==== 2022 ====
2022 Australian federal election: Cunningham
Party	Candidate	Votes	%	±%
Labor	Alison Byrnes	40,783	40.11	−6.50
Liberal	Marcus Uren	25,418	25.00	−5.97
Greens	Dylan Green	22,011	21.65	+6.56
One Nation	Thomas Grogan	5,218	5.13	+5.13
United Australia	Ben Britton	4,936	4.85	+1.05
Liberal Democrats	Michael Glover	2,207	2.17	+2.17
Citizens	Alexis Garnaut-Miller	1,098	1.08	+1.08
Total formal votes		101,671	94.86	+0.56
Informal votes		5,514	5.14	−0.56
Turnout		107,185	91.48	−1.17
Two-party-preferred result
Labor	Alison Byrnes	65,783	64.70	+1.29
Liberal	Marcus Uren	35,888	35.30	−1.29
Labor hold		Swing	+1.29	

Alluvial diagram for preference flows in the seat of Cunningham in the 2022 federal election. indicates at what stage the winning candidate had over 50% of the votes and was declared the winner.

=== Elections in the 2010s ===
==== 2019 ====
2019 Australian federal election: Cunningham
Party	Candidate	Votes	%	±%
Labor	Sharon Bird	46,923	46.61	−1.28
Liberal	Chris Atlee	31,177	30.97	+1.81
Greens	Rowan Huxtable	15,196	15.09	+0.44
United Australia	Grace Younger	3,828	3.80	+3.80
Sustainable Australia	John Gill	2,340	2.32	+2.32
Non-Custodial Parents	John Flanagan	1,213	1.20	−0.43
Total formal votes		100,677	94.30	−0.86
Informal votes		6,080	5.70	+0.86
Turnout		106,757	92.65	+1.14
Two-party-preferred result
Labor	Sharon Bird	63,836	63.41	+0.09
Liberal	Chris Atlee	36,841	36.59	−0.09
Labor hold		Swing	+0.09	

==== 2016 ====
2016 Australian federal election: Cunningham
Party	Candidate	Votes	%	±%
Labor	Sharon Bird	46,414	47.89	+0.89
Liberal	Michelle Blicavs	28,263	29.16	−2.81
Greens	Cath Blakey	14,200	14.65	+3.30
Christian Democrats	Michelle Ryan	3,939	4.06	+1.74
Science	Nathan Waters	2,526	2.61	+2.61
Non-Custodial Parents	John Flanagan	1,582	1.63	+0.67
Total formal votes		96,924	95.16	+2.20
Informal votes		4,933	4.84	−2.20
Turnout		101,857	91.51	−1.68
Two-party-preferred result
Labor	Sharon Bird	61,377	63.32	+2.03
Liberal	Michelle Blicavs	35,547	36.68	−2.03
Labor hold		Swing	+2.03	

==== 2013 ====
2013 Australian federal election: Cunningham
Party	Candidate	Votes	%	±%
Labor	Sharon Bird	41,522	45.54	−3.63
Liberal	Philip Clifford	30,685	33.65	+0.80
Greens	Helen Wilson	10,730	11.77	−3.35
Palmer United	Christopher Atlee	4,253	4.66	+4.66
Christian Democrats	Rob George	2,204	2.42	+2.42
Non-Custodial Parents	John Flanagan	897	0.98	−0.41
Katter's Australian	John Bursill	886	0.97	+0.97
Total formal votes		91,177	93.63	−0.69
Informal votes		6,208	6.37	+0.69
Turnout		97,385	93.56	−0.21
Two-party-preferred result
Labor	Sharon Bird	54,595	59.88	−3.29
Liberal	Philip Clifford	36,582	40.12	+3.29
Labor hold		Swing	−3.29	

==== 2010 ====
2010 Australian federal election: Cunningham
Party	Candidate	Votes	%	±%
Labor	Sharon Bird	43,769	49.17	−3.20
Liberal	Philip Clifford	29,241	32.85	+4.94
Greens	George Takacs	13,461	15.12	+0.90
Socialist Alliance	Jess Moore	1,303	1.46	+0.68
Non-Custodial Parents	John Flanagan	1,240	1.39	+0.85
Total formal votes		89,014	94.32	−1.77
Informal votes		5,359	5.68	+1.77
Turnout		94,373	93.72	−2.41
Two-party-preferred result
Labor	Sharon Bird	56,234	63.17	−3.70
Liberal	Philip Clifford	32,780	36.83	+3.70
Labor hold		Swing	−3.70	

=== Elections in the 2000s ===
==== 2007 ====
2007 Australian federal election: Cunningham
Party	Candidate	Votes	%	±%
Labor	Sharon Bird	44,835	53.23	+12.46
Liberal	Colin Fowler	22,438	26.64	−2.45
Greens	Michael Organ	12,326	14.63	−4.80
Christian Democrats	Nolene Norsworthy	2,232	2.65	−0.54
Family First	Jemma Tribe	1,203	1.43	+1.43
Socialist Alliance	Jess Moore	706	0.84	+0.45
Non-Custodial Parents	John Flanagan	489	0.58	+0.14
Total formal votes		84,229	96.04	+2.40
Informal votes		3,471	3.96	−2.40
Turnout		87,700	95.68	+0.26
Two-party-preferred result
Labor	Sharon Bird	57,382	68.13	+6.51
Liberal	Colin Fowler	26,847	31.87	−6.51
Labor hold		Swing	+6.51	

==== 2004 ====
2004 Australian federal election: Cunningham
Party	Candidate	Votes	%	±%
Labor	Sharon Bird	29,041	39.64	−4.55
Liberal	John Larter	21,115	28.82	+0.78
Greens	Michael Organ	14,747	20.13	+13.49
Christian Democrats	Jeff Dakers	2,547	3.48	+0.99
Independent Liberal	David Moulds	1,796	2.45	+2.45
Progressive Labour	James Stewart Keene	1,774	2.42	+2.42
Democrats	Tony Evans	686	0.94	−6.23
Liberals for Forests	Christopher Scrogie	509	0.69	+0.69
Independent	Paul Wilcock	375	0.51	+0.51
Non-Custodial Parents	John Flanagan	355	0.48	+0.48
Socialist Alliance	Chris Williams	310	0.42	+0.42
Total formal votes		73,255	93.55	−1.61
Informal votes		5,048	6.45	+1.61
Turnout		78,303	95.67	+0.25
Two-party-preferred result
Labor	Sharon Bird	45,026	61.46	+0.81
Liberal	John Larter	28,229	38.54	−0.81
Labor hold		Swing	0.81	

- Stephen Martin (Labor) had won the seat at the 2001 election, however he retired in 2002 and Michael Organ (Greens) won the seat at the resulting by-election.

==== 2002 by-election ====
2002 Cunningham by-election
Party	Candidate	Votes	%	±%
Labor	Sharon Bird	25,671	38.13	−6.06
Greens	Michael Organ	15,505	23.03	+16.39
Independent Liberal	David Moulds	9,147	13.59	+13.59
Independent Labor	Peter Wilson	7,107	10.56	+10.56
One Nation	Geoff Crocker	2,696	4.00	−0.63
Christian Democrats	Owen Nannelli	2,566	3.81	+1.32
Democrats	Linda Chapman	1,514	2.25	−4.92
Against Further Immigration	David Hughes	889	1.32	+1.32
Independent	Meg Sampson	671	1.00	+1.00
Non-Custodial Parents	John Flanagan	556	0.83	+0.83
Independent	James Keene	483	0.72	+0.72
Socialist Alliance	Chris Williams	399	0.59	+0.59
Citizens Electoral Council	Hal A. Johnson	120	0.18	+0.18
Total formal votes		67,324	92.26	−2.90
Informal votes		5,647	7.74	+2.90
Turnout		72,971	89.51	−5.91
Two-candidate-preferred result
Greens	Michael Organ	35,160	52.23	+52.23
Labor	Sharon Bird	32,164	47.77	−12.88
Greens gain from Labor		Swing	N/A	

Stephen Martin (Labor) resigned.

==== 2001 ====
2001 Australian federal election: Cunningham
Party	Candidate	Votes	%	±%
Labor	Stephen Martin	32,722	44.19	−8.13
Liberal	Jeremy Fields	20,760	28.04	+2.97
Democrats	Michael Newman	5,307	7.17	+1.44
Greens	Carol Berry	4,914	6.64	+2.22
Independent	Trevor Mott	4,235	5.72	+5.72
One Nation	John Curtis	3,425	4.63	−3.11
Christian Democrats	Paul Skinner	1,841	2.49	+0.17
No GST	J Edwin Pink	840	1.13	+1.13
Total formal votes		74,044	95.16	−1.39
Informal votes		3,763	4.84	+1.39
Turnout		77,807	95.81	
Two-party-preferred result
Labor	Stephen Martin	44,904	60.65	−7.12
Liberal	Jeremy Fields	29,140	39.35	+7.12
Labor hold		Swing	−7.12	

=== Elections in the 1990s ===
==== 1998 ====
1998 Australian federal election: Cunningham
Party	Candidate	Votes	%	±%
Labor	Stephen Martin	37,592	52.94	+0.35
Liberal	Alan Akhurst	17,285	24.34	−5.47
One Nation	John Curtis	5,378	7.57	+7.57
Democrats	Stephen Ivaneza	4,108	5.79	+0.80
Greens	Les Robinson	3,158	4.45	−1.39
Christian Democrats	Robert O'Neill	1,755	2.47	−0.16
Democratic Socialist	Margaret Perrott	663	0.93	+0.93
Unity	Jennifer van der Horn	550	0.77	+0.77
Independent	Frank Coluccio	515	0.73	+0.73
Total formal votes		71,004	96.51	+0.12
Informal votes		2,564	3.49	−0.12
Turnout		73,568	95.27	−1.26
Two-party-preferred result
Labor	Stephen Martin	48,423	68.20	+5.29
Liberal	Alan Akhurst	22,581	31.80	−5.29
Labor hold		Swing	+5.29	

==== 1996 ====
1996 Australian federal election: Cunningham
Party	Candidate	Votes	%	±%
Labor	Stephen Martin	37,267	52.59	−6.00
Liberal	Philip Williams	21,124	29.81	+3.45
Greens	Will Douglas	4,139	5.84	+1.13
Democrats	Mark Chilton	3,535	4.99	+0.86
Call to Australia	Robert O'Neill	1,863	2.63	+0.98
	Margaret Perrott	1,675	2.36	+2.36
Independent	Paul Wilcock	939	1.33	+1.33
Natural Law	Fred Misdom	317	0.45	−0.28
Total formal votes		70,859	96.39	−0.27
Informal votes		2,651	3.61	+0.27
Turnout		73,510	96.53	+0.16
Two-party-preferred result
Labor	Stephen Martin	44,302	62.91	−5.00
Liberal	Philip Williams	26,122	37.09	+5.00
Labor hold		Swing	−5.00	

==== 1993 ====
1993 Australian federal election: Cunningham
Party	Candidate	Votes	%	±%
Labor	Stephen Martin	41,011	58.59	+8.66
Liberal	Ralph Lynch	18,453	26.36	+1.70
Greens	Carole Medcalf	3,300	4.71	−0.64
Democrats	Daniela Reverberi	2,890	4.13	−9.62
Independent	Meg Sampson	1,923	2.76	+2.76
Call to Australia	Robert O'Neill	1,155	1.65	+1.58
Independent	Michael West	740	1.06	+1.06
Natural Law	Fred Misdom	510	0.73	+0.73
Total formal votes		79,991	96.66	−0.28
Informal votes		2,419	3.34	+0.28
Turnout		72,410	96.37	
Two-party-preferred result
Labor	Stephen Martin	47,485	67.91	+15.51
Liberal	Ralph Lynch	22,440	32.09	+32.09
Labor hold		Swing	+15.51	

==== 1990 ====
1990 Australian federal election: Cunningham
Party	Candidate	Votes	%	±%
Labor	Stewart West	27,547	44.4	−14.7
Liberal	Jeff Thomson	13,511	21.8	−7.7
Democrats	Meg Sampson	8,455	13.6	+3.2
Rex Connor Labor	Rex Connor	7,947	12.8	+12.8
|Illawarra Greens	Steve Brigham	4,295	6.9	+6.9
Independent	Peter Symonds	308	0.5	+0.5
Total formal votes		62,063	96.3	
Informal votes		2,371	3.7	
Turnout		64,434	95.8	
Two-party-preferred result
Labor	Stewart West		62.3	−2.1
Liberal	Jeff Thomson		37.7	+2.1
Two-candidate-preferred result
Labor	Stewart West	32,471	52.4	−12.0
Democrats	Meg Sampson	29,473	47.6	+47.6
Labor hold		Swing	N/A	

=== Elections in the 1980s ===
==== 1987 ====
1987 Australian federal election: Cunningham
Party	Candidate	Votes	%	±%
Labor	Stewart West	34,365	59.1	−3.7
Liberal	Jeff Thomson	17,171	29.5	+4.2
Democrats	Ray Dargavel	6,038	10.4	+2.8
Independent	Rudy Pasara	568	1.0	+1.0
Total formal votes		58,142	93.6	
Informal votes		3,988	6.4	
Turnout		62,130	92.9	
Two-party-preferred result
Labor	Stewart West	37,442	64.4	−4.7
Liberal	Jeff Thomson	20,693	35.6	+4.7
Labor hold		Swing	−4.7	

==== 1984 ====
1984 Australian federal election: Cunningham
Party	Candidate	Votes	%	±%
Labor	Stewart West	35,250	62.8	+1.2
Liberal	Gayle Mitchell	14,209	25.3	−0.6
Democrats	Greg Butler	4,281	7.6	+0.8
Independent	Neil Cleary	1,221	2.2	+2.2
Independent	Rudolph Dezelin	621	1.1	+1.1
Socialist Workers	John Garcia	561	1.0	−2.8
Total formal votes		56,143	92.8	
Informal votes		4,347	7.2	
Turnout		60,490	94.8	
Two-party-preferred result
Labor	Stewart West	38,750	69.1	−0.8
Liberal	Gayle Mitchell	17,365	30.9	+0.8
Labor hold		Swing	−0.8	

==== 1983 ====
1983 Australian federal election: Cunningham
Party	Candidate	Votes	%	±%
Labor	Stewart West	46,419	63.2	+7.3
Liberal	Gary Fisher	17,874	24.3	−6.2
Democrats	George Jones	4,986	6.8	−0.4
Socialist Workers	Diana Covell	2,802	3.8	+2.1
Communist	Romaine Rutnam	704	1.0	−2.6
Socialist Labour	Rudolf Pasara	689	0.9	−0.2
Total formal votes		73,474	97.0	
Informal votes		2,260	3.0	
Turnout		75,734	95.2	
Two-party-preferred result
Labor	Stewart West	50,399	68.6	+3.5
Liberal	Gary Fisher	23,075	31.4	−3.5
Labor hold		Swing	+3.5	

==== 1980 ====
1980 Australian federal election: Cunningham
Party	Candidate	Votes	%	±%
Labor	Stewart West	40,042	55.9	+2.4
Liberal	Thomas Griffin	21,818	30.5	−0.8
Democrats	Megan Sampson	5,185	7.2	−3.6
Communist	Peter Cockcroft	2,585	3.6	+2.0
Socialist Workers	Andrew Jamieson	1,197	1.7	+1.7
Socialist Labour	Richard Moore	810	1.1	+1.1
Total formal votes		71,637	96.7	
Informal votes		2,476	3.3	
Turnout		74,113	95.1	
Two-party-preferred result
Labor	Stewart West		65.1	+4.4
Liberal	Thomas Griffin		34.9	−4.4
Labor hold		Swing	+4.4	

=== Elections in the 1970s ===
==== 1977 ====
1977 Australian federal election: Cunningham
Party	Candidate	Votes	%	±%
Labor	Stewart West	36,559	53.5	−8.2
Liberal	Thomas Griffin	21,419	31.3	−5.1
Democrats	Ross Sampson	7,388	10.8	+10.8
Independent	Noel Dennett	1,583	2.3	+2.3
Communist	Mervyn Nixon	1,073	1.6	+1.6
Independent	Rudolph Dezelin	375	0.5	+0.5
Total formal votes		68,397	97.2	
Informal votes		1,957	2.8	
Turnout		70,354	95.5	
Two-party-preferred result
Labor	Stewart West		60.7	−1.6
Liberal	Thomas Griffin		39.3	+1.6
Labor hold		Swing	−1.6	

==== 1977 by-election ====
1977 Cunningham by-election
Party	Candidate	Votes	%	±%
Labor	Stewart West	36,425	56.4	−5.3
Liberal	Thomas Griffin	20,748	32.1	−4.3
Democrats	Ross Sampson	5,011	7.8	+7.8
Independent	Rudolph Dezelin	1,136	1.8	+1.8
Total formal votes		64,556	97.2	
Informal votes		1,888	2.8	
Turnout		66,444	86.7	
Two-party-preferred result
Labor	Stewart West		60.7	−1.9
Liberal	Thomas Griffin		39.3	+1.9
Labor hold		Swing	−1.9	

Rex Connor (Labor) died.

==== 1975 ====
1975 Australian federal election: Cunningham
Party	Candidate	Votes	%	±%
Labor	Rex Connor	42,350	61.7	−8.2
Liberal	Peter Swan	24,972	36.4	+9.3
Workers	Peter Robertson	681	1.0	+1.0
Independent	Bernard Groben	611	0.9	+0.9
Total formal votes		68,614	98.0	
Informal votes		1,420	2.0	
Turnout		70,034	96.0	
Two-party-preferred result
Labor	Rex Connor		62.4	−9.4
Liberal	Peter Swan		37.6	+9.4
Labor hold		Swing	−9.4	

==== 1974 ====
1974 Australian federal election: Cunningham
Party	Candidate	Votes	%	±%
Labor	Rex Connor	47,129	69.9	+5.5
Liberal	Warren Hough	18,242	27.1	+1.0
Australia	Susan Healy	2,067	3.1	−1.9
Total formal votes		67,438	98.3	
Informal votes		1,140	1.7	
Turnout		68,578	95.4	
Two-party-preferred result
Labor	Rex Connor		71.8	+2.7
Liberal	Warren Hough		28.2	−2.7
Labor hold		Swing	+2.7	

==== 1972 ====
1972 Australian federal election: Cunningham
Party	Candidate	Votes	%	±%
Labor	Rex Connor	38,306	64.4	+0.4
Liberal	John Poel	15,524	26.1	−7.9
Australia	John Sladek	2,962	5.0	+5.0
Democratic Labor	Peter Daly	1,968	3.3	+3.3
Communist	Reg Wilding	692	1.2	−0.9
Total formal votes		59,452	96.8	
Informal votes		1,981	3.2	
Turnout		61,433	95.6	
Two-party-preferred result
Labor	Rex Connor		69.1	+3.2
Liberal	John Poel		30.9	−3.2
Labor hold		Swing	+3.2	

=== Elections in the 1960s ===
==== 1969 ====
1969 Australian federal election: Cunningham
Party	Candidate	Votes	%	±%
Labor	Rex Connor	35,092	64.0	+11.9
Liberal	John Poel	18,618	34.0	−8.4
Communist	Reg Wilding	1,126	2.1	+0.4
Total formal votes		54,836	97.1	
Informal votes		1,643	2.9	
Turnout		56,479	95.2	
Two-party-preferred result
Labor	Rex Connor		65.9	+10.3
Liberal	John Poel		34.1	−10.3
Labor hold		Swing	+10.3	

==== 1966 ====
1966 Australian federal election: Cunningham
Party	Candidate	Votes	%	±%
Labor	Rex Connor	31,986	54.5	−3.9
Liberal	John Poel	23,473	40.0	+1.8
Independent	Victor Kearney	1,951	3.3	+3.3
Communist	Reg Wilding	977	1.7	−1.7
Independent	Jeffrey Fenton	354	0.6	+0.6
Total formal votes		58,741	96.6	
Informal votes		2,066	3.4	
Turnout		60,807	95.8	
Two-party-preferred result
Labor	Rex Connor		58.0	−3.5
Liberal	John Poel		42.0	+3.5
Labor hold		Swing	−3.5	

==== 1963 ====
1963 Australian federal election: Cunningham
Party	Candidate	Votes	%	±%
Labor	Rex Connor	31,905	58.4	−3.6
Liberal	Jack Hough	20,900	38.2	+3.9
Communist	Bill McDougall	1,836	3.4	−0.3
Total formal votes		54,641	97.5	
Informal votes		1,390	2.5	
Turnout		56,031	95.4	
Two-party-preferred result
Labor	Rex Connor		61.5	−3.8
Liberal	Jack Hough		38.5	+3.8
Labor hold		Swing	−3.8	

==== 1961 ====
1961 Australian federal election: Cunningham
Party	Candidate	Votes	%	±%
Labor	Victor Kearney	31,474	62.0	+4.2
Liberal	Jack Hough	17,422	34.3	−0.8
Communist	Bill McDougall	1,884	3.7	+0.6
Total formal votes		50,780	97.1	
Informal votes		1,532	2.9	
Turnout		52,312	95.5	
Two-party-preferred result
Labor	Victor Kearney		65.3	+3.9
Liberal	Jack Hough		34.7	−3.9
Labor hold		Swing	+3.9	

=== Elections in the 1950s ===
==== 1958 ====
1958 Australian federal election: Cunningham
Party	Candidate	Votes	%	±%
Labor	Victor Kearney	25,087	57.8	−4.4
Liberal	Jack Hough	15,242	35.1	+2.1
Democratic Labor	Harold Woods	1,716	4.0	+4.0
Communist	Bill McDougall	1,336	3.1	−1.7
Total formal votes		43,381	95.3	
Informal votes		2,141	4.7	
Turnout		45,522	94.1	
Two-party-preferred result
Labor	Victor Kearney		61.4	−5.1
Liberal	Jack Hough		38.6	+5.1
Labor hold		Swing	−5.1	

==== 1956 by-election ====
1956 Cunningham by-election
Party	Candidate	Votes	%	±%
Labor	Victor Kearney	unopposed		
Labor hold		Swing		

Billy Davies (Labor) died.

==== 1955 ====
1955 Australian federal election: Cunningham
Party	Candidate	Votes	%	±%
Labor	Billy Davies	25,180	62.2	+0.7
Liberal	John Parkinson	13,370	33.0	+0.8
Communist	William Harkness	1,931	4.8	−1.5
Total formal votes		40,481	97.2	
Informal votes		1,172	2.8	
Turnout		41,653	95.2	
Two-party-preferred result
Labor	Billy Davies		66.5	+0.6
Liberal	John Parkinson		33.5	−0.6
Labor hold		Swing	+0.6	

==== 1954 ====
1954 Australian federal election: Cunningham
Party	Candidate	Votes	%	±%
Labor	Billy Davies	27,683	62.1	+0.4
Liberal	John Parkinson	14,067	31.9	−0.1
Communist	Bill Parkinson	2,644	6.0	−0.2
Total formal votes		44,094	98.7	
Informal votes		588	1.3	
Turnout		44,682	96.0	
Two-party-preferred result
Labor	Billy Davies		67.5	+0.2
Liberal	John Parkinson		32.5	−0.2
Labor hold		Swing	+0.2	

==== 1951 ====
1951 Australian federal election: Cunningham
Party	Candidate	Votes	%	±%
Labor	Billy Davies	24,433	61.7	+1.0
Liberal	Alan Thomson	12,674	32.0	+0.3
Communist	Eric Aarons	2,466	6.2	−1.4
Total formal votes		39,573	98.3	
Informal votes		691	1.7	
Turnout		40,264	96.1	
Two-party-preferred result
Labor	Billy Davies		67.7	−0.5
Liberal	Alan Thomson		32.3	+0.5
Labor hold		Swing	−0.5	

=== Elections in the 1940s ===
==== 1949 ====
1949 Australian federal election: Cunningham
Party	Candidate	Votes	%	±%
Labor	Billy Davies	22,795	60.7	+3.0
Liberal	Alan Thomson	11,892	31.7	+0.8
Communist	Eric Aarons	2,854	7.6	−4.7
Total formal votes		37,541	97.3	
Informal votes		1,047	2.7	
Turnout		38,588	95.7	
Two-party-preferred result
Labor	Billy Davies		68.2	+0.4
Liberal	Alan Thomson		31.8	−0.4
Labor notional hold		Swing	+0.4	
