= Members of the New South Wales Legislative Assembly, 1962–1965 =

Members of the New South Wales Legislative Assembly who served in the 40th parliament held their seats from 1962 to 1965. They were elected at the 1962 state election, and at by-elections. The Speaker was Ray Maher.

Name	Party	Electorate	Term in office
Robert Askin	Liberal	Collaroy	1950–1975
Brian Bannon	Labor	Rockdale	1959–1986
Jack Beale	Liberal	South Coast	1942–1973
Alfred Bennett	Labor	Nepean	1962–1965
Ken Booth	Labor	Kurri Kurri	1960–1988
Lionel Bowen	Labor	Randwick	1962–1969
George Brain	Liberal	Willoughby	1943–1968
Jim Brown	Country	Raleigh	1959–1984
Tim Bruxner	Country	Tenterfield	1962–1981
Tom Cahill	Labor	Cook's River	1959–1983
Bill Chaffey	Country	Tamworth	1940–1973
Reg Coady	Labor	Drummoyne	1954–1973
Keith Compton	Labor	Lismore	1959–1965
Rex Connor (Note: Wollongong-Kembla Labor MLA Rex Connor resigned on 22 October 1963, in order to contest the federal seat of Cunningham at the 1963 election. Labor candidate Doug Porter won the resulting by-election on 29 February.)	Labor	Wollongong-Kembla	1950–1963
Geoffrey Cox (Note: Vaucluse Liberal MLA Geoffrey Cox died on 16 November 1964. No by-election was held due to the proximity of the 1965 state election.)	Liberal	Vaucluse	1957–1964
Bill Crabtree	Labor	Kogarah	1953–1983
Geoff Crawford	Country	Barwon	1950–1976
Douglas Cross	Liberal	Georges River	1948–1953, 1956–1970
Charles Cutler	Country	Orange	1947–1975
Tom Dalton	Labor	Sutherland	1953–1956, 1959–1968
Douglas Darby	Independent	Manly	1945–1978
Bernie Deane	Liberal	Hawkesbury	1950–1972
Ben Doig (Note: Burwood MLA Ben Doig resigned from the Liberal Party in 1964 after losing preselection to recontest his seat. He said that he had been defeated due to his support of state aid to church schools, and served out the remainder of his term as an independent.)	Liberal/Independent	Burwood	1957–1965
Frank Downing	Labor	Ryde	1953–1968
Vince Durick (Note: Lakemba Labor MLA Stan Wyatt died on 26 July 1964. Labor candidate Vince Durick won the resulting by-election on 19 September.)	Labor	Lakemba	1964–1984
Clarrie Earl	Labor	Bass Hill	1953–1973
George Enticknap	Labor	Murrumbidgee	1941–1965
Jack Ferguson	Labor	Fairfield	1959–1984
Wal Fife	Liberal	Wagga Wagga	1957–1975
Pat Flaherty	Labor	Granville	1962–1984
Les Ford (Note: Dubbo Liberal MLA Les Ford died on 17 December 1964. No by-election was held due to the proximity of the 1965 state election.)	Liberal	Dubbo	1959–1964
Howard Fowles	Labor	Illawarra	1941–1968
George Freudenstein	Country	Young	1959–1981
Edward Greaves (Note: Waratah Labor MLA Edward Greaves died on 4 July 1964. Independent candidate Frank Purdue won the resulting by-election on 8 August.)	Labor	Waratah	1962–1964
Fred Green	Labor	Redfern	1950–1968
Ian Griffith	Liberal	Cronulla	1956–1978
Frank Hawkins	Labor	Newcastle	1935–1968
Dick Healey	Liberal	Wakehurst	1962–1981
Eric Hearnshaw	Liberal	Eastwood	1945–1965
Bob Heffron	Labor	Maroubra	1930–1968
Pat Hills	Labor	Phillip	1954–1988
Davis Hughes	Country	Armidale	1950–1953, 1956–1973
David Hunter	Liberal	Ashfield-Croydon	1940–1976
Harold Jackson	Liberal	Gosford	1950-1965
Rex Jackson	Labor	Bulli	1955–1986
Harry Jago	Liberal	Gordon	1962–1973
Les Jordan	Liberal	Oxley	1944–1965
Nick Kearns	Labor	Bankstown	1962–1980
Gus Kelly	Labor	Bathurst	1925–1932, 1935–1967
Joe Kelly	Labor	East Hills	1956–1973
Abe Landa	Labor	Bondi	1930–1965
Joe Lawson	Country	Murray	1932–1973
Tom Lewis	Liberal	Wollondilly	1957–1978
John Maddison	Liberal	Hornsby	1962–1980
Ray Maher	Labor	Wyong	1953–1965
Dan Mahoney	Labor	Parramatta	1959–1976
Cliff Mallam	Labor	Dulwich Hill	1953–1968, 1971–1981
Jack Mannix	Labor	Liverpool	1952–1971
Richmond Manyweathers (Note: Casino Country Party MLA Ian Robinson resigned on 22 October 1963, in order to contest the federal seat of Cowper at the 1963 election. Country Party candidate Richmond Manyweathers won the resulting by-election on 29 February.)	Country	Casino	1964–1968
Robert McCartney	Labor	Hamilton	1959–1971
Ken McCaw	Liberal	Lane Cove	1947–1975
John McMahon	Labor	Balmain	1950–1968
Tom Morey	Labor	Bligh	1962–1965
Milton Morris	Liberal	Maitland	1956–1980
Pat Morton	Liberal	Mosman	1947–1972
Thomas Murphy	Labor	Concord	1953–1968
George Neilly	Labor	Cessnock	1959–1978
Leo Nott	Labor	Mudgee	1953–1973
Frank O'Keefe	Country	Upper Hunter	1961–1969
Doug Padman	Liberal	Albury	1947–1965
Doug Porter	Labor	Wollongong-Kembla	1964–1965
Leon Punch	Country	Gloucester	1959–1985
Frank Purdue	Independent	Waratah	1956–1962, 1964–1965
Ernie Quinn	Labor	Wentworthville	1962–1988
Jack Renshaw	Labor	Castlereagh	1941–1980
Bill Rigby	Labor	Hurstville	1959–1965
Ian Robinson	Country	Casino	1953–1963
Jim Robson	Labor	Hartley	1956–1965
Max Ruddock	Liberal	The Hills	1962–1976
Norm Ryan	Labor	Marrickville	1953–1973
Thomas Ryan	Labor	Auburn	1956–1965
John Seiffert	Labor	Monaro	1941–1965
Bill Sheahan	Labor	Burrinjuck	1941–1973
Jim Simpson	Labor	Lake Macquarie	1950–1968
Albert Sloss	Labor	King	1956–1973
Jim Southee	Labor	Blacktown	1962–1973
Stanley Stephens	Country	Byron	1944–1973
Jack Stewart	Labor	Kahibah	1957–1972
Kevin Stewart	Labor	Canterbury	1962–1985
Jim Taylor	Country	Temora	1960–1981
Laurie Tully	Labor	Goulburn	1946–1965
John Waddy	Liberal	Kirribilli	1962–1976
Lou Walsh	Labor	Coogee	1953–1956, 1962–1965
William Wattison	Labor	Sturt	1947–1968
Bill Weiley	Country	Clarence	1955–1971
Ernest Wetherell	Labor	Cobar	1949–1965
Eric Willis	Liberal	Earlwood	1950–1978
Stan Wyatt	Labor	Lakemba	1950–1964

== See also ==
- Second Heffron ministry
- Renshaw ministry
- Results of the 1962 New South Wales state election
- Candidates of the 1962 New South Wales state election
