= Results of the 1962 New South Wales state election =

State election for New South Wales, Australia in March 1962

New South Wales state election, 3 March 1962 Legislative Assembly << 1959–1965 >>
Enrolled voters	2,173,768 (Note: There were 2,082,320 enrolled voters in 90 contested electorates and 91,448 were enrolled in 4 uncontested electorates (2 Labor, 2 Liberal).)				
Votes cast	1,957,406		Turnout	94.00	+0.00
Informal votes	30,048		Informal	1.54	−0.29
Summary of votes by party
Party	Primary votes	%	Swing	Seats	Change
Labor	936,047	48.57	−0.55	54	+5
Liberal	671,716	34.85	−0.50	25	−3
Country	180,640	9.37	+0.66	14	−2
Independent	60,420	3.13	−0.50	0	−1
Independent Liberal	37,555	1.95	+1.95	1	+1
Democratic Labor	28,830	1.50	+0.18	0	−
Communist	12,150	0.63	−0.82	0	−
Total	1,927,358			94	

This is a list of electoral district results for the 1962 New South Wales state election.

== Results by Electoral district ==
=== Albury ===
1962 New South Wales state election: Albury
Party	Candidate	Votes	%	±%
Liberal	Doug Padman	10,518	53.1	−5.1
Labor	Robert White	7,832	39.6	+7.8
Democratic Labor	Leo Keane	949	4.8	−5.2
Independent	Robert Garland	498	2.5	+2.5
Total formal votes		19,797	99.1	
Informal votes		188	0.9	
Turnout		19,985	93.2	
Two-party-preferred result
Liberal	Doug Padman	11,526	58.2	−6.0
Labor	Robert White	8,271	41.8	+6.0
Liberal hold		Swing	−6.0	

=== Armidale ===
1962 New South Wales state election: Armidale
Party	Candidate	Votes	%	±%
Country	Davis Hughes	9,959	62.5	+4.2
Labor	Mark Shanahan	5,966	37.5	−1.0
Total formal votes		15,925	98.6	
Informal votes		225	1.4	
Turnout		16,150	94.7	
Country hold		Swing	+1.3	

=== Ashfield−Croydon ===
1962 New South Wales state election: Ashfield−Croydon
Party	Candidate	Votes	%	±%
Liberal	David Hunter	13,662	56.5	+19.1
Labor	Brian Hannelly	10,503	43.5	+7.8
Total formal votes		24,165	98.7	
Informal votes		312	1.3	
Turnout		24,477	92.8	
Liberal hold		Swing	−5.4	

=== Auburn ===
1962 New South Wales state election: Auburn
Party	Candidate	Votes	%	±%
Labor	Thomas Ryan	16,430	64.9	+0.3
Liberal	Robert Leech	8,877	35.1	−0.3
Total formal votes		25,307	98.7	
Informal votes		333	1.3	
Turnout		25,640	95.3	
Labor hold		Swing	+0.3	

=== Balmain ===
1962 New South Wales state election: Balmain
Party	Candidate	Votes	%	±%
Labor	John McMahon	16,245	74.0	+3.6
Liberal	Winston Pickering	4,679	21.3	−2.1
Communist	Stanley Moran	1,030	4.7	−1.5
Total formal votes		21,954	97.7	
Informal votes		519	2.3	
Turnout		22,473	94.0	
Two-party-preferred result
Labor	John McMahon	17,069	77.7	+2.4
Liberal	Winston Pickering	4,885	22.3	−2.4
Labor hold		Swing	+2.4	

=== Bankstown ===
1962 New South Wales state election: Bankstown
Party	Candidate	Votes	%	±%
Labor	Nick Kearns	15,292	59.9	+0.6
Liberal	David Cowan	9,006	35.3	+1.8
Communist	Allan Cooper	1,235	4.8	+1.6
Total formal votes		25,533	98.5	
Informal votes		393	1.5	
Turnout		25,926	94.2	
Two-party-preferred result
Labor	Nick Kearns	16,280	63.8	−0.1
Liberal	David Cowan	9,253	36.2	+0.1
Labor hold		Swing	−0.1	

=== Barwon ===
1962 New South Wales state election: Barwon
Party	Candidate	Votes	%	±%
Country	Geoff Crawford	10,589	56.6	−1.0
Labor	Cecil Newton	8,117	43.4	+1.0
Total formal votes		18,706	99.2	
Informal votes		146	0.8	
Turnout		18,852	94.0	
Country hold		Swing	−1.0	

=== Bass Hill ===
1962 New South Wales state election: Bass Hill
Party	Candidate	Votes	%	±%
Labor	Clarrie Earl	14,307	63.1	−2.3
Liberal	William Pardy	6,621	29.2	−5.4
Independent	Isaac Denley	1,755	7.7	+7.7
Total formal votes		22,683	98.0	
Informal votes		459	2.0	
Turnout		23,142	93.7	
Two-party-preferred result
Labor	Clarrie Earl	15,535	68.5	+3.1
Liberal	William Pardy	7,148	31.5	−3.1
Labor hold		Swing	+3.1	

Bass Hill was a new seat that was notionally a safe Labor seat.

=== Bathurst ===
1962 New South Wales state election: Bathurst
Party	Candidate	Votes	%	±%
Labor	Gus Kelly	10,251	62.0	+2.6
Liberal	Campbell Alexander	6,283	38.0	−2.6
Total formal votes		16,534	99.3	
Informal votes		124	0.7	
Turnout		16,658	96.2	
Labor hold		Swing	+2.6	

=== Blacktown ===
1962 New South Wales state election: Blacktown
Party	Candidate	Votes	%	±%
Labor	Jim Southee	17,255	61.7	+10.2
Liberal	Ross Shuttleworth	10,713	38.3	−4.6
Total formal votes		27,968	97.8	
Informal votes		632	2.2	
Turnout		28,600	94.2	
Labor gain from Liberal		Swing	+8.7	

- Blacktown became a notional Labor seat in the redistribution.

=== Bligh ===
1962 New South Wales state election: Bligh
Party	Candidate	Votes	%	±%
Labor	Tom Morey	11,186	50.2	
Liberal	Vernon Treatt	10,098	45.3	
Democratic Labor	James Markham	1,012	4.5	
Total formal votes		22,296	98.2	
Informal votes		411	1.8	
Turnout		22,707	92.2	
Two-party-preferred result
Labor	Tom Morey	11,388	51.1	
Liberal	Vernon Treatt	10,908	48.9	
Labor notional gain from Liberal		Swing		

- Bligh was a new seat created from the abolished districts of Paddington−Waverley, held by Keith Anderson (Labor) and Woollahra held by Vernon Treatt (Liberal). It was a notionally a marginal Liberal seat.

=== Bondi ===
1962 New South Wales state election: Bondi
Party	Candidate	Votes	%	±%
Labor	Abe Landa	13,898	59.2	+5.8
Liberal	Carl Jeppesen	9,575	40.8	−1.6
Total formal votes		23,473	98.5	
Informal votes		363	1.5	
Turnout		23,836	92.7	
Labor hold		Swing	+5.2	

=== Bulli ===
1962 New South Wales state election: Bulli
Party	Candidate	Votes	%	±%
Labor	Rex Jackson	14,424	68.2	+2.5
Liberal	Donald Heggie	5,636	26.7	−2.7
Communist	Sara Bowen	1,074	5.1	+0.3
Total formal votes		21,134	98.5	
Informal votes		316	1.5	
Turnout		21,450	94.5	
Two-party-preferred result
Labor	Rex Jackson	15,283	72.3	+2.7
Liberal	Donald Heggie	5,851	27.7	−2.7
Labor hold		Swing	+2.7	

=== Burrinjuck ===
1962 New South Wales state election: Burrinjuck
Party	Candidate	Votes	%	±%
Labor	Bill Sheahan	9,702	57.0	+1.4
Country	David Asimus	7,315	43.0	−1.4
Total formal votes		17,017	99.4	
Informal votes		103	0.6	
Turnout		17,120	95.7	
Labor hold		Swing	+1.4	

=== Burwood ===
1962 New South Wales state election: Burwood
Party	Candidate	Votes	%	±%
Liberal	Ben Doig	14,862	61.6	0.0
Labor	Doug Sutherland	9,272	38.4	0.0
Total formal votes		24,134	98.3	
Informal votes		407	1.7	
Turnout		24,541	91.6	
Liberal hold		Swing	0.0	

=== Byron ===
1962 New South Wales state election: Byron
Party	Candidate	Votes	%	±%
Country	Stanley Stephens	9,831	58.2	−41.8
Labor	James Constable	7,045	41.8	+41.8
Total formal votes		16,876	99.4	
Informal votes		109	0.6	
Turnout		16,985	94.1	
Country hold		Swing	N/A	

=== Canterbury ===
1962 New South Wales state election: Canterbury
Party	Candidate	Votes	%	±%
Labor	Kevin Stewart	14,469	60.1	+1.5
Liberal	Donald Arthur	9,589	39.9	−1.5
Total formal votes		24,058	98.4	
Informal votes		399	1.6	
Turnout		24,457	94.0	
Labor hold		Swing	+1.5	

=== Casino ===
1962 New South Wales state election: Casino
Party	Candidate	Votes	%	±%
Country	Ian Robinson	10,773	66.6	−33.4
Labor	Douglas Cassidy	5,390	33.4	+33.4
Total formal votes		16,163	99.4	
Informal votes		101	0.6	
Turnout		16,264	94.9	
Country hold		Swing	N/A	

=== Castlereagh ===
1962 New South Wales state election: Castlereagh
Party	Candidate	Votes	%	±%
Labor	Jack Renshaw	9,353	53.0	+0.2
Liberal	William Waterford	4,933	27.9	+27.9
Country	Calverley Brown	3,031	17.2	−30.0
Democratic Labor	Violet Amor	334	1.9	+1.9
Total formal votes		17,651	98.9	
Informal votes		202	1.1	
Turnout		17,853	93.7	
Two-party-preferred result
Labor	Jack Renshaw	9,632	54.6	+1.8
Liberal	William Waterford	8,019	45.4	+45.4
Labor hold		Swing	+1.8	

=== Cessnock ===
1962 New South Wales state election: Cessnock
Party	Candidate	Votes	%	±%
Labor	George Neilly	12,754	66.2	+3.8
Independent	Robert Brown	4,000	20.8	+20.8
Liberal	Edward Farrell	1,935	10.0	+10.0
Communist	Stanley Smith	574	3.0	−5.4
Total formal votes		19,263	99.0	
Informal votes		187	1.0	
Turnout		19,450	95.6	
Two-candidate-preferred result
Labor	George Neilly	14,009	72.7	+6.1
Independent	Robert Brown	5,254	27.3	+27.3
Labor hold		Swing	N/A	

=== Clarence ===
1962 New South Wales state election: Clarence
Party	Candidate	Votes	%	±%
Country	Bill Weiley	11,121	53.8	−46.2
Labor	William Bailey	8,799	42.6	+42.6
Independent	Garth Munro	758	3.7	+3.7
Total formal votes		20,678	99.2	
Informal votes		175	0.8	
Turnout		20,853	95.5	
Two-party-preferred result
Country	Bill Weiley	11,500	55.6	−44.4
Labor	William Bailey	9,178	44.4	+44.4
Country hold		Swing	N/A	

=== Cobar ===
1962 New South Wales state election: Cobar
Party	Candidate	Votes	%	±%
Labor	Ernest Wetherell	unopposed		
Labor hold				

=== Collaroy ===
1962 New South Wales state election: Collaroy
Party	Candidate	Votes	%	±%
Liberal	Robert Askin	16,476	72.5	0.0
Labor	Peter Hopkins	5,591	24.6	−2.9
Communist	Stanley Deacon	649	2.9	+2.9
Total formal votes		22,716	98.8	
Informal votes		266	1.2	
Turnout		22,982	93.3	
Two-party-preferred result
Liberal	Robert Askin	16,606	73.1	+0.6
Labor	Peter Hopkins	6,110	26.9	−0.6
Liberal hold		Swing	+0.6	

=== Concord ===
1962 New South Wales state election: Concord
Party	Candidate	Votes	%	±%
Labor	Thomas Murphy	12,896	53.4	+4.3
Liberal	Lerryn Mutton	10,593	43.8	−1.6
Democratic Labor	John Winters	682	2.8	−2.7
Total formal votes		24,171	98.8	
Informal votes		295	1.2	
Turnout		24,466	94.2	
Two-party-preferred result
Labor	Thomas Murphy	13,032	53.9	+2.3
Liberal	Lerryn Mutton	11,139	46.1	−2.3
Labor hold		Swing	+2.3	

=== Coogee ===
1962 New South Wales state election: Coogee
Party	Candidate	Votes	%	±%
Labor	Lou Walsh	11,323	49.7	+3.4
Liberal	Kevin Ellis	10,392	45.6	−3.7
Democratic Labor	Peter Daly	1,061	4.7	+0.3
Total formal votes		22,776	98.7	
Informal votes		296	1.3	
Turnout		23,072	91.7	
Two-party-preferred result
Labor	Lou Walsh	11,615	51.0	+3.7
Liberal	Kevin Ellis	11,161	49.0	−3.7
Labor gain from Liberal		Swing	+3.7	

=== Cook's River ===
1962 New South Wales state election: Cook's River
Party	Candidate	Votes	%	±%
Labor	Tom Cahill	17,447	74.4	+3.5
Liberal	Sidney Pitkethly	5,999	25.6	+1.3
Total formal votes		23,446	98.4	
Informal votes		389	1.6	
Turnout		23,835	95.2	
Labor hold		Swing	−0.1	

=== Cronulla ===
1962 New South Wales state election: Cronulla
Party	Candidate	Votes	%	±%
Liberal	Ian Griffith	15,618	61.2	+0.6
Labor	Francis Russell	9,919	38.8	−0.6
Total formal votes		25,537	99.0	
Informal votes		250	1.0	
Turnout		25,787	94.8	
Liberal hold		Swing	+0.6	

=== Drummoyne ===
1962 New South Wales state election: Drummoyne
Party	Candidate	Votes	%	±%
Labor	Reg Coady	12,510	52.8	+1.3
Liberal	Walter Lawrence	11,191	47.2	−1.3
Total formal votes		23,701	98.6	
Informal votes		344	1.4	
Turnout		24,045	93.6	
Labor gain from Liberal		Swing	+1.3	

- Drummoyne became a notional Labor seat in the redistribution.

=== Dubbo ===
1962 New South Wales state election: Dubbo
Party	Candidate	Votes	%	±%
Liberal	Les Ford	10,693	55.9	+26.9
Labor	Martin Berry	7,445	38.9	−0.7
Independent	Clarrie Robertson	981	5.1	+5.1
Total formal votes		19,119	99.1	
Informal votes		175	0.9	
Turnout		19,294	94.6	
Two-party-preferred result
Liberal	Les Ford	11,085	58.0	+0.9
Labor	Martin Berry	8,034	42.0	−0.9
Liberal hold		Swing	+0.9	

=== Dulwich Hill ===
1962 New South Wales state election: Dulwich Hill
Party	Candidate	Votes	%	±%
Labor	Cliff Mallam	12,703	57.6	+5.3
Liberal	William Bellenger	9,340	42.4	−0.4
Total formal votes		22,043	98.6	
Informal votes		302	1.4	
Turnout		22,345	92.4	
Labor hold		Swing	+4.3	

=== Earlwood ===
1962 New South Wales state election: Earlwood
Party	Candidate	Votes	%	±%
Liberal	Eric Willis	13,286	57.3	−1.1
Labor	William Thompson	9,918	42.7	+1.1
Total formal votes		23,204	99.0	
Informal votes		230	1.0	
Turnout		23,434	95.6	
Liberal hold		Swing	−1.1	

=== East Hills ===
1962 New South Wales state election: East Hills
Party	Candidate	Votes	%	±%
Labor	Joe Kelly	16,005	66.8	+2.1
Liberal	Keith Batten	7,949	33.2	+6.8
Total formal votes		23,954	98.3	
Informal votes		407	1.7	
Turnout		24,361	95.3	
Labor hold		Swing	−0.6	

=== Eastwood ===
1962 New South Wales state election: Eastwood
Party	Candidate	Votes	%	±%
Liberal	Eric Hearnshaw	18,137	67.2	−0.5
Labor	Robert Mayhew	8,833	32.8	+0.5
Total formal votes		26,970	99.0	
Informal votes		282	1.0	
Turnout		27,252	94.0	
Liberal hold		Swing	−0.5	

=== Fairfield ===
1962 New South Wales state election: Fairfield
Party	Candidate	Votes	%	±%
Labor	Jack Ferguson	14,348	63.1	+2.7
Liberal	Frederick Jackson	8,395	36.9	+0.5
Total formal votes		22,743	97.9	
Informal votes		491	2.1	
Turnout		23,234	94.4	
Labor hold		Swing	+0.3	

=== Georges River ===
1962 New South Wales state election: Georges River
Party	Candidate	Votes	%	±%
Liberal	Douglas Cross	14,063	52.6	+0.3
Labor	Albert Kealman	12,297	46.0	+1.5
Independent	Fitzgerald Mulholland	395	1.5	+0.1
Total formal votes		26,755	98.8	
Informal votes		323	1.2	
Turnout		27,078	95.6	
Two-party-preferred result
Liberal	Douglas Cross	14,261	53.3	−1.2
Labor	Albert Kealman	12,494	46.7	+1.2
Liberal hold		Swing	−1.2	

=== Gloucester ===
1962 New South Wales state election: Gloucester
Party	Candidate	Votes	%	±%
Country	Leon Punch	8,590	43.8	−13.4
Labor	Loris Kable	5,801	29.6	+29.6
Country	Alan Borthwick	4,576	23.3	+23.3
Democratic Labor	Aubrey Barr	640	3.3	+3.3
Total formal votes		19,607	98.9	
Informal votes		214	1.1	
Turnout		19,821	95.8	
Two-party-preferred result
Country	Leon Punch	12,567	64.1	+6.9
Labor	Loris Kable	7,040	35.9	+35.9
Country hold		Swing	N/A	

=== Gordon ===
1962 New South Wales state election: Gordon
Party	Candidate	Votes	%	±%
Liberal	Harry Jago	12,872	49.3	
Independent	Stewart Fraser (defeated)	7,872	30.2	
Independent	Phyllis Atkins	2,216	8.5	
Independent	George Nicol	1,941	7.4	
Democratic Labor	Dominique Droulers	1,194	4.6	
Total formal votes		26,095	98.0	
Informal votes		529	2.0	
Turnout		26,624	93.7	
Two-candidate-preferred result
Liberal	Harry Jago	15,156	58.1	
Independent	Stewart Fraser	10,939	41.9	
Liberal hold		Swing	N/A	

Stewart Fraser was the sitting Liberal member however he lost pre-selection.

=== Gosford ===
1962 New South Wales state election: Gosford
Party	Candidate	Votes	%	±%
Liberal	Harold Jackson	10,473	50.7	−6.7
Labor	Kevin Dwyer	10,170	49.3	+6.7
Total formal votes		20,643	98.8	
Informal votes		241	1.2	
Turnout		20,884	95.1	
Liberal hold		Swing	−6.7	

=== Goulburn ===
1962 New South Wales state election: Goulburn
Party	Candidate	Votes	%	±%
Labor	Laurie Tully	8,869	51.4	+1.5
Liberal	George Ashley	7,793	45.2	+1.7
Democratic Labor	Reginald Andrews	579	3.4	−3.2
Total formal votes		17,241	99.4	
Informal votes		100	0.6	
Turnout		17,341	96.8	
Two-party-preferred result
Labor	Laurie Tully	8,985	52.1	+0.2
Liberal	George Ashley	8,256	47.9	−0.2
Labor hold		Swing	+0.2	

=== Granville ===
1962 New South Wales state election: Granville
Party	Candidate	Votes	%	±%
Labor	Pat Flaherty	12,997	54.9	−13.0
Liberal	Ernest Lough	7,110	30.0	+3.0
Independent	Albert Olsen	2,769	11.7	+11.7
Communist	John Bridgefoot	806	3.4	−1.7
Total formal votes		23,682	97.7	
Informal votes		555	2.3	
Turnout		24,237	93.5	
Two-party-preferred result
Labor	Pat Flaherty	15,857	67.0	−5.0
Liberal	Ernest Lough	7,825	33.0	+5.0
Labor hold		Swing	−5.0	

=== Hamilton ===
1962 New South Wales state election: Hamilton
Party	Candidate	Votes	%	±%
Labor	Robert McCartney	11,251	59.8	+4.3
Liberal	Alwyn Watkins	6,538	34.7	+1.0
Democratic Labor	Robert Burke	1,030	5.5	−5.3
Total formal votes		18,819	98.5	
Informal votes		289	1.5	
Turnout		19,108	94.7	
Two-party-preferred result
Labor	Robert McCartney	11,457	60.9	+3.2
Liberal	Alwyn Watkins	7,362	39.1	−3.2
Labor hold		Swing	+3.2	

=== Hartley ===
1962 New South Wales state election: Hartley
Party	Candidate	Votes	%	±%
Labor	Jim Robson	8,778	48.9	−39.0
Independent	Harold Coates	8,530	47.5	+47.5
Communist	Peter Carroll	658	3.7	−8.4
Total formal votes		17,966	98.7	
Informal votes		227	1.3	
Turnout		18,193	96.0	
Two-candidate-preferred result
Labor	Jim Robson	9,100	50.7	−37.2
Independent	Harold Coates	8,866	49.3	+49.3
Labor hold		Swing	N/A	

=== Hawkesbury ===
1962 New South Wales state election: Hawkesbury
Party	Candidate	Votes	%	±%
Liberal	Bernie Deane	12,915	61.0	−4.5
Labor	Lawrence Kaufmann	7,138	33.7	−0.8
Independent	Donald McKay	1,125	5.3	+5.3
Total formal votes		21,178	98.5	
Informal votes		312	1.5	
Turnout		21,490	93.6	
Two-party-preferred result
Liberal	Bernie Deane	13,646	64.4	−1.1
Labor	Lawrence Kaufmann	7,532	35.6	+1.1
Liberal hold		Swing	−1.1	

=== Hornsby ===
1962 New South Wales state election: Hornsby
Party	Candidate	Votes	%	±%
Liberal	John Maddison	14,508	54.2	−15.5
Labor	Percy Staines	6,604	24.7	−5.6
Independent	Sydney Storey	3,494	13.1	+13.1
Independent	Robert Turner	2,141	8.0	+8.0
Total formal votes		26,747	98.9	
Informal votes		307	1.1	
Turnout		27,054	94.2	
Two-party-preferred result
Liberal	John Maddison	18,723	70.0	−0.4
Labor	Percy Staines	8,024	30.0	+0.4
Liberal hold		Swing	−0.4	

=== Hurstville ===
1962 New South Wales state election: Hurstville
Party	Candidate	Votes	%	±%
Labor	Bill Rigby	12,796	52.4	+21.2
Liberal	Richard Hawkins	10,257	42.0	+4.0
Independent	Thomas Dalton	893	3.7	+3.7
Democratic Labor	Thomas Brosnan	478	2.0	+2.0
Total formal votes		24,424	98.5	
Informal votes		380	1.5	
Turnout		24,804	94.4	
Two-party-preferred result
Labor	Bill Rigby	13,517	55.3	+1.5
Liberal	Richard Hawkins	10,907	44.7	−1.5
Labor hold		Swing	+1.5	

=== Illawarra ===
1962 New South Wales state election: Illawarra
Party	Candidate	Votes	%	±%
Labor	Howard Fowles	13,442	66.5	−2.5
Liberal	John Weickhardt	5,239	25.9	+25.9
Communist	Milton Clunne	1,522	7.5	−2.3
Total formal votes		20,203	97.7	
Informal votes		464	2.3	
Turnout		20,667	93.4	
Two-party-preferred result
Labor	Howard Fowles	14,660	72.6	−1.3
Liberal	John Weickhardt	5,543	27.4	+27.4
Labor hold		Swing	N/A	

=== Kahibah ===
1962 New South Wales state election: Kahibah
Party	Candidate	Votes	%	±%
Labor	Jack Stewart	12,011	61.7	−2.1
Independent	Wallace MacDonald	7,473	38.3	+38.3
Total formal votes		19,484	98.5	
Informal votes		298	1.5	
Turnout		19,782	95.4	
Labor hold		Swing	−2.1	

=== King ===
1962 New South Wales state election: King
Party	Candidate	Votes	%	±%
Labor	Albert Sloss	13,470	63.7	+3.6
Liberal	Norah O'Kelly	5,345	25.3	−7.3
Democratic Labor	William Doherty	1,481	7.0	+7.0
Communist	Alfred Watt	868	4.1	−3.3
Total formal votes		21,164	96.9	
Informal votes		682	3.1	
Turnout		21,846	89.9	0.0
Two-party-preferred result
Labor	Albert Sloss	14,460	68.3	+2.4
Liberal	Norah O'Kelly	6,704	31.7	−2.4
Labor hold		Swing	+2.4	

=== Kirribilli ===
1962 New South Wales state election: Kirribilli
Party	Candidate	Votes	%	±%
Liberal	John Waddy	11,106	49.6	
Labor	Joseph Hazell	10,105	45.1	
Democratic Labor	Sydney Mostyn	1,181	5.3	
Total formal votes		22,392	98.2	
Informal votes		416	1.8	
Turnout		22,808	91.4	
Two-party-preferred result
Liberal	John Waddy	11,898	53.1	
Labor	Joseph Hazell	10,494	46.9	
Liberal notional hold		Swing	N/A	

- Kirribilli was a new seat that was notionally a safe Liberal seat.

=== Kogarah ===
1962 New South Wales state election: Kogarah
Party	Candidate	Votes	%	±%
Labor	Bill Crabtree	13,007	56.0	+2.7
Liberal	John Partridge	10,233	44.0	+0.7
Total formal votes		23,240	99.1	
Informal votes		200	0.9	
Turnout		23,440	94.5	
Labor hold		Swing	+1.1	

=== Kurri Kurri ===
1962 New South Wales state election: Kurri Kurri
Party	Candidate	Votes	%	±%
Labor	Ken Booth	unopposed		
Labor hold				

=== Lake Macquarie ===
1962 New South Wales state election: Lake Macquarie
Party	Candidate	Votes	%	±%
Labor	Jim Simpson	15,316	75.6	−13.1
Liberal	Reuben Hull	4,941	24.4	+24.4
Total formal votes		20,257	98.4	
Informal votes		320	1.6	
Turnout		20,577	94.4	
Labor hold		Swing	N/A	

=== Lakemba ===
1962 New South Wales state election: Lakemba
Party	Candidate	Votes	%	±%
Labor	Stan Wyatt	15,454	60.5	−3.5
Liberal	Russell Carter	9,415	36.8	+0.8
Communist	Stanley Rust	682	2.7	+2.7
Total formal votes		25,551	98.7	
Informal votes		324	1.3	
Turnout		25,875	94.8	
Two-party-preferred result
Labor	Stan Wyatt	16,000	62.6	−1.4
Liberal	Russell Carter	9,551	37.4	+1.4
Labor hold		Swing	−1.4	

=== Lane Cove ===
1962 New South Wales state election: Lane Cove
Party	Candidate	Votes	%	±%
Liberal	Ken McCaw	unopposed		
Liberal hold				

=== Lismore ===
1962 New South Wales state election: Lismore
Party	Candidate	Votes	%	±%
Labor	Keith Compton	9,268	55.5	+55.5
Country	William Blair	7,087	42.4	−7.6
Democratic Labor	John Antill	344	2.1	+2.1
Total formal votes		16,699	99.2	
Informal votes		134	0.8	
Turnout		16,833	95.1	
Two-party-preferred result
Labor	Keith Compton	9,337	55.9	+55.9
Country	William Blair	7,362	44.1	−5.9
Labor gain from Country		Swing	N/A	

- The Country Party had won the 1959 election for Lismore by 2 votes, however it was declared void by the Court of Disputed Returns. The resulting by-election was won by Keith Compton (Labor).

=== Liverpool ===
1962 New South Wales state election: Liverpool
Party	Candidate	Votes	%	±%
Labor	Jack Mannix	15,398	61.3	+2.4
Liberal	John Bridge	8,459	33.7	−7.4
Democratic Labor	Kevin Davis	1,265	5.0	+5.0
Total formal votes		25,122	97.6	
Informal votes		620	2.4	
Turnout		25,742	92.9	
Two-party-preferred result
Labor	Jack Mannix	15,651	62.3	+3.4
Liberal	John Bridge	9,471	37.7	−3.4
Labor hold		Swing	+3.4	

=== Maitland ===
1962 New South Wales state election: Maitland
Party	Candidate	Votes	%	±%
Liberal	Milton Morris	11,325	57.9	+5.7
Labor	George Lyons	8,235	42.1	+1.3
Total formal votes		19,560	99.1	
Informal votes		182	0.9	
Turnout		19,742	95.9	
Liberal hold		Swing	+0.3	

=== Manly ===
1962 New South Wales state election: Manly
Party	Candidate	Votes	%	±%
Independent Liberal	Douglas Darby	12,049	48.9	+48.9
Liberal	Harry Boyle	9,874	40.0	−23.1
Independent	John Gillmer	2,743	11.1	+11.1
Total formal votes		24,666	97.3	
Informal votes		694	2.7	
Turnout		25,360	93.1	
Two-candidate-preferred result
Independent Liberal	Douglas Darby	13,799	55.9	+55.9
Liberal	Harry Boyle	10,867	44.1	−19.0
Member changed to Independent Liberal from Liberal		Swing	N/A	

=== Maroubra ===
1962 New South Wales state election: Maroubra
Party	Candidate	Votes	%	±%
Labor	Bob Heffron	14,493	67.9	+6.6
Liberal	Alexander Alexander	6,074	28.5	−6.8
Independent	Leslie Bond	775	3.6	+3.6
Total formal votes		21,342	98.3	
Informal votes		371	1.7	
Turnout		21,713	94.6	
Two-party-preferred result
Labor	Bob Heffron	14,881	69.7	+5.7
Liberal	Alexander Alexander	6,461	30.3	−5.7
Labor hold		Swing	+5.7	

=== Marrickville ===
1962 New South Wales state election: Marrickville
Party	Candidate	Votes	%	±%
Labor	Norm Ryan	16,010	67.9	−1.1
Liberal	Bruce Fry	7,117	30.2	−0.8
Independent	William McCristal	465	2.0	+2.0
Total formal votes		23,592	98.3	
Informal votes		418	1.7	
Turnout		24,010	92.7	
Two-party-preferred result
Labor	Norm Ryan	16,302	69.1	+0.1
Liberal	Bruce Fry	7,290	30.9	−0.1
Labor hold		Swing	+0.1	

=== Monaro ===
1962 New South Wales state election: Monaro
Party	Candidate	Votes	%	±%
Labor	John Seiffert	9,217	57.5	−0.1
Liberal	Jack McArthur	6,825	42.5	+0.1
Total formal votes		16,042	98.9	
Informal votes		178	1.1	
Turnout		16,220	93.2	
Labor hold		Swing	−0.1	

=== Mosman ===
1962 New South Wales state election: Mosman
Party	Candidate	Votes	%	±%
Liberal	Pat Morton	18,900	80.8	−9.4
Democratic Labor	Reginald Lawson	4,504	19.2	+19.2
Total formal votes		23,404	95.3	
Informal votes		1,147	4.7	
Turnout		24,551	91.6	
Liberal hold		Swing	N/A	

=== Mudgee ===
1962 New South Wales state election: Mudgee
Party	Candidate	Votes	%	±%
Labor	Leo Nott	8,772	53.9	+4.6
Liberal	Albert Cox	4,187	25.7	−0.6
Country	Edward Punch	2,988	18.3	−3.9
Democratic Labor	Edward Byrnes	334	2.1	−0.1
Total formal votes		16,281	98.5	
Informal votes		247	1.5	
Turnout		16,528	95.4	
Two-party-preferred result
Labor	Leo Nott	9,048	55.6	+4.7
Liberal	Albert Cox	7,233	44.4	−4.7
Labor hold		Swing	+4.7	

=== Murray ===
1962 New South Wales state election: Murray
Party	Candidate	Votes	%	±%
Country	Joe Lawson	11,764	66.1	+1.5
Labor	John Hayes	6,034	33.9	−1.5
Total formal votes		17,798	99.3	
Informal votes		132	0.7	
Turnout		17,930	90.9	
Country hold		Swing	+1.5	

=== Murrumbidgee ===
1962 New South Wales state election: Murrumbidgee
Party	Candidate	Votes	%	±%
Labor	George Enticknap	9,128	49.3	+1.7
Liberal	Sidney Braithwaite	4,631	25.0	+25.0
Country	Alfred Tiffen	3,689	19.9	−12.7
Democratic Labor	Stanley Axtill	1,083	5.8	+1.4
Total formal votes		18,531	97.9	
Informal votes		405	2.1	
Turnout		18,936	93.6	
Two-party-preferred result
Labor	George Enticknap	9,751	52.6	−3.9
Liberal	Sidney Braithwaite	8,780	47.4	+3.9
Labor hold		Swing	−3.9	

=== Nepean ===
1962 New South Wales state election:
Party	Candidate	Votes	%	±%
Labor	Alfred Bennett	12,267	50.8	+10.1
Liberal	Bill Chapman	11,892	49.2	−6.1
Total formal votes		24,159	98.1	
Informal votes		467	1.9	
Turnout		24,626	94.1	
Labor gain from Liberal		Swing	+7.0	

=== Newcastle ===
1962 New South Wales state election: Newcastle
Party	Candidate	Votes	%	±%
Labor	Frank Hawkins	11,642	62.3	−2.2
Liberal	Kevin Doyle	6,310	33.7	+2.3
Communist	Mervyn Copley	750	4.0	−0.1
Total formal votes		18,702	98.8	
Informal votes		232	1.2	
Turnout		18,934	93.1	
Two-party-preferred result
Labor	Frank Hawkins	12,242	65.5	−2.3
Liberal	Kevin Doyle	6,460	34.5	+2.3
Labor hold		Swing	−2.3	

=== Orange ===
1962 New South Wales state election: Orange
Party	Candidate	Votes	%	±%
Country	Charles Cutler	11,148	60.3	−0.7
Labor	Allan Reed	7,328	39.7	+0.7
Total formal votes		18,476	99.0	
Informal votes		183	1.0	
Turnout		18,659	95.7	
Country hold		Swing	−0.7	

=== Oxley ===
1962 New South Wales state election: Oxley
Party	Candidate	Votes	%	±%
Liberal	Les Jordan	8,311	41.3	+41.3
Labor	Joseph Andrews	7,117	35.4	+35.4
Country	Bruce Cowan	4,440	22.1	−45.1
Independent	William Kennewell	254	1.3	+1.3
Total formal votes		20,122	99.0	
Informal votes		194	1.0	
Turnout		20,316	96.7	
Two-party-preferred result
Liberal	Les Jordan	12,325	61.2	+61.2
Labor	Joseph Andrews	7,797	38.8	+38.8
Member changed to Liberal from Country		Swing	N/A	

=== Parramatta ===
1962 New South Wales state election: Parramatta
Party	Candidate	Votes	%	±%
Labor	Dan Mahoney	14,373	57.8	+3.9
Liberal	Marion Hearnshaw	10,479	42.2	−0.6
Total formal votes		24,852	98.8	
Informal votes		297	1.2	
Turnout		25,149	94.7	
Labor hold		Swing	+3.3	

=== Phillip ===
1962 New South Wales state election: Phillip
Party	Candidate	Votes	%	±%
Labor	Pat Hills	15,665	68.4	+3.0
Liberal	Jean Wood	6,040	26.4	−2.4
Communist	Joy Williams	1,212	5.3	−0.4
Total formal votes		22,917	96.9	
Informal votes		741	3.1	
Turnout		23,658	89.4	
Two-party-preferred result
Labor	Pat Hills	16,635	72.6	+2.8
Liberal	Jean Wood	6,282	27.4	−2.8
Labor hold		Swing	+2.8	

=== Raleigh ===
1962 New South Wales state election: Raleigh
Party	Candidate	Votes	%	±%
Country	Jim Brown	10,960	63.5	+27.7
Labor	Trevor Owens	6,302	36.5	+1.4
Total formal votes		17,262	99.3	
Informal votes		116	0.7	
Turnout		17,378	96.1	
Country hold		Swing	+3.2	

=== Randwick ===
1962 New South Wales state election: Randwick
Party	Candidate	Votes	%	±%
Labor	Lionel Bowen	12,300	55.2	−1.4
Liberal	Adrian Molloy	8,780	39.4	−1.7
Democratic Labor	Charles De Monchaux	1,215	5.4	+3.0
Total formal votes		22,295	98.6	
Informal votes		326	1.4	
Turnout		22,621	93.1	
Two-party-preferred result
Labor	Lionel Bowen	12,543	56.3	−0.7
Liberal	Adrian Molloy	9,752	43.7	+0.7
Labor hold		Swing	−0.7	

=== Redfern ===
1962 New South Wales state election: Redfern
Party	Candidate	Votes	%	±%
Labor	Fred Green	18,284	81.8	+2.3
Liberal	Peter Kamperogianis	2,987	13.4	−3.5
Communist	Henry Hatfield	1,090	4.9	+1.2
Total formal votes		22,361	97.8	
Informal votes		503	2.2	
Turnout		22,864	91.0	
Two-party-preferred result
Labor	Fred Green	19,156	85.7	+3.5
Liberal	Peter Kamperogianis	3,205	14.3	−3.5
Labor hold		Swing	+3.5	

=== Rockdale ===
1962 New South Wales state election: Rockdale
Party	Candidate	Votes	%	±%
Labor	Brian Bannon	13,544	54.8	+8.7
Liberal	Sidney Alewood	10,185	41.2	−2.1
Democratic Labor	Brian Adams	1,006	4.1	+0.7
Total formal votes		24,735	98.7	
Informal votes		330	1.3	
Turnout		25,065	94.7	
Two-party-preferred result
Labor	Brian Bannon	13,745	55.6	+4.2
Liberal	Sidney Alewood	10,990	44.4	−4.2
Labor hold		Swing	+4.2	

=== Ryde ===
1962 New South Wales state election: Ryde
Party	Candidate	Votes	%	±%
Labor	Frank Downing	15,827	60.0	+8.5
Liberal	Edward Hall	10,555	40.0	−5.0
Total formal votes		26,382	98.8	
Informal votes		318	1.2	
Turnout		26,700	95.3	
Labor hold		Swing	+7.8	

=== South Coast ===
1962 New South Wales state election: South Coast
Party	Candidate	Votes	%	±%
Liberal	Jack Beale	10,807	49.9	−15.6
Labor	John Seiffert	7,407	34.2	+34.2
Independent Liberal	Charles Shirley	3,436	15.9	+15.9
Total formal votes		21,650	99.1	
Informal votes		203	0.9	
Turnout		21,853	94.4	
Two-party-preferred result
Liberal	Jack Beale	13,289	61.4	−4.1
Labor	John Seiffert	8,361	38.6	+38.6
Liberal hold		Swing	N/A	

=== Sturt ===
1962 New South Wales state election: Sturt
Party	Candidate	Votes	%	±%
Labor	William Wattison	10,284	75.0	+7.0
Country	Edward Brown	3,424	25.0	+4.6
Total formal votes		13,708	99.0	
Informal votes		143	1.0	
Turnout		13,851	87.9	
Labor hold		Swing	+2.9	

=== Sutherland ===
1962 New South Wales state election: Sutherland
Party	Candidate	Votes	%	±%
Labor	Tom Dalton	12,697	46.3	−3.9
Liberal	Noel Walker	10,021	36.5	−9.2
Independent	Keith Bates	4,173	15.2	+15.2
Democratic Labor	Malcolm Towner	450	1.6	+0.3
Independent	John Mantova	86	0.3	+0.3
Total formal votes		27,427	98.9	
Informal votes		304	1.1	
Turnout		27,731	96.1	
Two-party-preferred result
Labor	Tom Dalton	15,207	55.5	+2.7
Liberal	Noel Walker	12,220	44.5	−2.7
Labor hold		Swing	+2.7	

=== Tamworth ===
1962 New South Wales state election: Tamworth
Party	Candidate	Votes	%	±%
Country	Bill Chaffey	11,679	61.4	
Labor	Norman Turner	7,328	38.6	
Total formal votes		19,007	99.1	
Informal votes		173	0.9	
Turnout		19,180	95.1	
Country hold		Swing	N/A	

=== Temora ===
1962 New South Wales state election: Temora
Party	Candidate	Votes	%	±%
Country	Jim Taylor	10,094	63.9	
Labor	Lyle Hoad	5,708	36.1	
Total formal votes		15,802	99.3	
Informal votes		105	0.7	
Turnout		15,907	95.3	
Country hold		Swing	N/A	

=== Tenterfield ===
1962 New South Wales state election: Tenterfield
Party	Candidate	Votes	%	±%
Country	Tim Bruxner	8,940	50.7	−17.3
Labor	Eric Potter	8,675	49.3	+17.3
Total formal votes		17,615	99.2	
Informal votes		147	0.8	
Turnout		17,762	94.3	
Country hold		Swing	−17.3	

=== The Hills ===
1962 New South Wales state election: The Hills
Party	Candidate	Votes	%	±%
Liberal	Max Ruddock	13,781	56.3	
Independent Liberal	Alfred Dennis	10,704	43.7	+43.7
Total formal votes		24,485	97.3	
Informal votes		681	2.7	
Turnout		25,166	93.2	
Liberal hold		Swing	N/A	

- The Hills was a new seat that was notionally a safe Liberal seat. Alfred Dennis was the sitting Liberal member for Blacktown.

=== Upper Hunter ===
1962 New South Wales state election: Upper Hunter
Party	Candidate	Votes	%	±%
Country	Frank O'Keefe	8,651	50.4	+10.4
Labor	Geoffrey Heuston	8,517	49.6	+8.8
Total formal votes		17,168	99.4	
Informal votes		97	0.6	
Turnout		17,265	96.0	
Country hold		Swing	−2.1	

=== Vaucluse ===
1962 New South Wales state election: Vaucluse
Party	Candidate	Votes	%	±%
Liberal	Geoffrey Cox	17,840	79.0	−21.0
Democratic Labor	Valerie Olsen	4,754	21.0	+21.0
Total formal votes		22,594	93.3	
Informal votes		1,625	6.7	
Turnout		24,219	90.1	
Liberal hold		Swing	N/A	

=== Wagga Wagga ===
1962 New South Wales state election: Wagga Wagga
Party	Candidate	Votes	%	±%
Liberal	Wal Fife	10,259	57.2	+2.3
Labor	Leonard Brown	6,659	37.1	−0.9
Democratic Labor	Anthony Abbey	1,027	5.7	−1.4
Total formal votes		17,945	98.9	
Informal votes		197	1.1	
Turnout		18,142	94.3	
Two-party-preferred result
Liberal	Wal Fife	11,081	61.7	+1.1
Labor	Leonard Brown	6,864	38.3	−1.1
Liberal hold		Swing	+1.1	

=== Wakehurst ===
1962 New South Wales state election: Wakehurst
Party	Candidate	Votes	%	±%
Liberal	Dick Healey	11,689	51.7	−9.4
Labor	John Fisher	8,062	35.6	−3.3
Independent	Edgar Wilson	1,440	6.4	+6.4
Independent	Beverley Job	792	3.5	+3.5
Democratic Labor	Philip Cohen	638	2.8	+2.8
Total formal votes		22,621	97.9	
Informal votes		491	2.1	
Turnout		23,112	94.0	
Two-party-preferred result
Liberal	Dick Healey	13,315	58.9	−2.2
Labor	John Fisher	9,306	41.1	+2.2
Liberal notional hold		Swing		

- Wakehurst was a new seat that was notionally a safe Liberal seat.

=== Waratah ===
1962 New South Wales state election: Waratah
Party	Candidate	Votes	%	±%
Labor	Edward Greaves	10,024	52.7	+6.0
Independent	Frank Purdue	8,998	47.3	−6.0
Total formal votes		19,022	98.8	
Informal votes		224	1.2	
Turnout		19,246	95.6	
Labor gain from Independent		Swing	+6.0	

=== Wentworthville ===
1962 New South Wales state election: Wentworthville
Party	Candidate	Votes	%	±%
Labor	Ernie Quinn	12,362	51.2	−4.7
Liberal	Graham Cullis	7,204	29.8	−14.3
Independent	Montague Bennett	4,604	19.0	+19.0
Total formal votes		24,170	98.4	
Informal votes		390	1.6	
Turnout		24,560	95.0	
Two-party-preferred result
Labor	Ernie Quinn	14,664	60.7	+4.8
Liberal	Graham Cullis	9,506	39.3	−4.8
Labor notional hold		Swing		

- Wentworthville was a new seat that was notionally a safe Labor seat.

=== Willoughby ===
1962 New South Wales state election: Willoughby
Party	Candidate	Votes	%	±%
Liberal	George Brain	unopposed		
Liberal hold				

=== Wollondilly ===
1962 New South Wales state election: Wollondilly
Party	Candidate	Votes	%	±%
Liberal	Tom Lewis	12,825	56.9	+0.2
Labor	Jack Wharton	9,719	43.1	−0.2
Total formal votes		22,544	99.0	
Informal votes		234	1.0	
Turnout		22,778	94.9	
Liberal hold		Swing	+0.2	

=== Wollongong−Kembla ===
1962 New South Wales state election: Wollongong−Kembla
Party	Candidate	Votes	%	±%
Labor	Rex Connor	12,236	58.5	+0.1
Liberal	Jack Hough	8,698	41.5	−0.1
Total formal votes		20,934	98.4	
Informal votes		344	1.6	
Turnout		21,278	93.6	
Labor hold		Swing	+0.1	

=== Wyong ===
1962 New South Wales state election: Wyong
Party	Candidate	Votes	%	±%
Labor	Ray Maher	10,431	53.3	
Liberal	Kenneth Charters	7,797	39.8	
Democratic Labor	Hugh Ansell	727	3.7	
Independent	Harold Turnbull	615	3.1	
Total formal votes		19,570	98.5	
Informal votes		293	1.5	
Turnout		19,863	94.5	
Two-party-preferred result
Labor	Ray Maher	10,883	55.6	
Liberal	Kenneth Charters	8,687	44.4	
Labor notional hold		Swing	N/A	

- Wyong was a new seat that was notionally a safe Labor seat.

=== Young ===
1962 New South Wales state election: Young
Party	Candidate	Votes	%	±%
Country	George Freudenstein	9,991	53.6	+19.1
Labor	Peter Kelly	7,800	41.8	+2.9
Democratic Labor	Ronald Silk	862	4.6	+0.6
Total formal votes		18,653	99.2	
Informal votes		150	0.8	
Turnout		18,803	95.9	
Two-party-preferred result
Country	George Freudenstein	10,681	57.3	−1.0
Labor	Peter Kelly	7,972	42.7	+1.0
Country hold		Swing	+1.0	

== See also ==
- Candidates of the 1962 New South Wales state election
- Members of the New South Wales Legislative Assembly, 1962–1965
