= 1950 Wollongong-Kembla state by-election =

Election result for Wollongong-Kembla, New South Wales, Australia

A by-election was held for the New South Wales Legislative Assembly electorate of Wollongong-Kembla on 11 February 1950 because of the resignation of Billy Davies (Labor) to successfully contest the federal seat of Cunningham at the 1949 election.

== Dates ==
Date	Event
28 October 1949	Billy Davies resigned.
10 December 1949	1949 federal election
17 January 1950	Writ of election issued by the Speaker of the Legislative Assembly.
23 January 1950	Nominations
11 February 1950	Polling day
13 March 1950	Return of writ

== Result ==
1950 Wollongong-Kembla by-election Saturday 11 February
Party	Candidate	Votes	%	±%
Labor	Baden Powell	7,674	50.9	
Liberal	Gerald Sargent	7,413	49.1	
Total formal votes		15,087	98.5	
Informal votes		230	1.5	
Turnout		15,317	87.4	
Liberal hold		Swing	N/A	

== Aftermath ==
Baden Powell did not serve for long, losing pre-selection for the 1950 state election and retiring from politics.

== See also ==
- Electoral results for the district of Wollongong-Kembla
- List of New South Wales state by-elections
