= 1964 Wollongong-Kembla state by-election =

Election for the New South Wales Legislative Assembly seat of Wollongong-Kembla

- February 29, 1964.

On 29 February 1964, Wollongong-Kembla held a state by-election for its seat on the New South Wales Legislative Assembly. It was triggered by the resignation of Rex Connor (Labor) to successfully contest the federal seat of Cunningham at the 1963 election.

== Timeline ==
Date	Event
22 October 1963	Rex Connor resigned.
30 November 1963	1963 Australian federal election
5 February 1964	Writ of election issued by the Speaker of the Legislative Assembly.
12 February 1964	Date of nomination
29 February 1964	Polling day
31 March 1964	Return of writ

== Result ==
1964 Wollongong-Kembla by-election Saturday 29 February
Party	Candidate	Votes	%	±%
Labor	Doug Porter	9,641	50.5	−8.0
Liberal	Jack Hough	9,441	49.5	+8.0
Total formal votes		19,082	97.4	−1.0
Informal votes		512	2.6	+1.0
Turnout		19,594	85.4	−8.2
Labor hold		Swing	−8.2	

== See also ==
- Electoral results for the district of Wollongong-Kembla
- List of New South Wales state by-elections
