= Candidates of the 1962 New South Wales state election =

This is a list of candidates of the 1962 New South Wales state election. The election was held on 3 March 1962.

== Retiring Members ==
=== Labor ===
- Keith Anderson (Paddington-Waverley) — lost preselection for Bligh.
- William Gollan (Randwick)
- Bill Lamb (Granville) — lost preselection.
- Spence Powell (Bankstown)
- Arthur Tonge (Canterbury) — lost preselection.

=== Liberal ===
- Ivan Black (Neutral Bay)

=== Country ===
- Sir Michael Bruxner (Tenterfield)
- Ray Fitzgerald (Gloucester)

== Legislative Assembly ==
Sitting members are shown in bold text. Successful candidates are highlighted in the relevant colour.

Electorate	Held by	Labor candidate	Coalition candidate	Other candidates
Albury	Liberal	Robert White	**Doug Padman** (Lib)	Robert Garland (Ind); Leo Keane (DLP)
Armidale	Country	Mark Shanahan	**Davis Hughes** (CP)	
Ashfield-Croydon	Liberal	Brian Hannelly	**David Hunter** (Lib)	
Auburn	Labor	**Thomas Ryan**	Robert Leech (Lib)	
Balmain	Labor	**John McMahon**	Winston Pickering (Lib)	Stan Moran (CPA)
Bankstown	Labor	Nick Kearns	David Cowan (Lib)	Allan Cooper (CPA)
Barwon	Country	Cecil Newton	**Geoff Crawford** (CP)	
Bass Hill	notional Labor	**Clarrie Earl**	William Pardy (Lib)	Isaac Denley (Ind)
Bathurst	Labor	**Gus Kelly**	Campbell Alexander (Lib)	
Blacktown	notional Labor |Jim Southee	Ross Shuttleworth (Lib)		
Bligh	notional Liberal	Tom Morey	**Vernon Treatt** (Lib)	James Markham (DLP)
Bondi	Labor	**Abe Landa**	Carl Jeppesen (Lib)	
Bulli	Labor	**Rex Jackson**	Donald Heggie (Lib)	Sara Bowen (CPA)
Burrinjuck	Labor	**Bill Sheahan**	David Asimus (CP)	
Burwood	Liberal	Doug Sutherland	**Ben Doig** (Lib)	
Byron	Country	James Constable	**Stanley Stephens** (CP)	
Canterbury	Labor	Kevin Stewart	Donald Arthur (Lib)	
Casino	Country	Douglas Cassidy	**Ian Robinson** (CP)	
Castlereagh	Labor	**Jack Renshaw**	Calverley Brown (CP); William Waterford (Lib)	Violet Amor (DLP)
Cessnock	Labor	**George Neilly**	Edward Farrell (Lib)	Robert Brown (Ind); Stanley Smith (CPA)
Clarence	Country	William Bailey	**Bill Weiley** (CP)	Garth Munro (Ind)
Cobar	Labor	**Ernest Wetherell**		
Collaroy	Liberal	Peter Hopkins	**Robert Askin** (Lib)	Stan Deacon (CPA)
Concord	Labor	**Thomas Murphy**	Lerryn Mutton (Lib)	John Winters (DLP)
Coogee	Liberal	Lou Walsh	**Kevin Ellis** (Lib)	Peter Daly (DLP)
Cook's River	Labor	**Tom Cahill**	Sidney Pitkethly (Lib)	
Cronulla	Liberal	Francis Russell	**Ian Griffith** (Lib)	
Drummoyne	Labor	**Reg Coady**	**Walter Lawrence** (Lib)	
Dubbo	Liberal	Martin Berry	**Les Ford** (Lib)	Clarrie Robertson (Ind)
Dulwich Hill	Labor	**Cliff Mallam**	William Bellenger (Lib)	
Earlwood	Liberal	William Thompson	**Eric Willis** (Lib)	
East Hills	Labor	**Joe Kelly**	Keith Batten (Lib)	
Eastwood	Liberal	Robert Mayhew	**Eric Hearnshaw** (Lib)	
Fairfield	Labor	**Jack Ferguson**	Frederick Jackson (Lib)	
Georges River	Liberal	Albert Kealman	**Douglas Cross** (Lib)	Fitzgerald Mulholland (Ind)
Gloucester	Country	Loris Kable	**Leon Punch** (CP)	Aubrey Barr (DLP)
Gloucester	Country	Loris Kable	Alan Borthwick (CP)	Aubrey Barr (DLP)
Gordon	Liberal		Harry Jago (Lib)	Phyllis Atkins (Ind); Dominique Droulers (DLP); **Stewart Fraser** (Ind Lib); George Nicol (Ind)
Gosford	Liberal	Kevin Dwyer	**Harold Jackson** (Lib)	
Goulburn	Labor	**Laurie Tully**	George Ashley (Lib)	Reginald Andrews (DLP)
Granville	Labor	Pat Flaherty	Ernest Lough (Lib)	John Bridgefoot (CPA); Albert Olsen (Ind)
Hamilton	Labor	**Robert McCartney**	Alwyn Watkins (Lib)	Robert Burke (DLP)
Hartley	Labor	**Jim Robson**		Peter Carroll (CPA); Harold Coates (Ind)
Hawkesbury	Liberal	Lawrence Kaufmann	**Bernie Deane** (Lib)	Donald McKay (Ind)
Hornsby	Liberal	Percy Staines	John Maddison (Lib)	**Sydney Storey** (Ind Lib); Robert Turner (Ind)
Hurstville	Labor	**Bill Rigby**	Richard Hawkins (Lib)	Thomas Brosnan (DLP); Thomas Dalton (Ind)
Illawarra	Labor	**Howard Fowles**	John Weickhardt (Lib)	Milton Clunne (CPA)
Kahibah	Labor	**Jack Stewart**		Wallace MacDonald (Ind)
King	Labor	**Albert Sloss**	Norah O'Kelly (Lib)	William Doherty (DLP); Alf Watt (CPA)
Kirribilli	notional Liberal	Joseph Hazell	John Waddy (Lib)	Sydney Mostyn (DLP)
Kogarah	Labor	**Bill Crabtree**	John Partridge (Lib)	
Kurri Kurri	Labor	**Ken Booth**		
Lake Macquarie	Labor	**Jim Simpson**	Reuben Hull (Lib)	
Lakemba	Labor	**Stan Wyatt**	Russell Carter (Lib)	Stanley Rust (CPA)
Lane Cove	Liberal		**Ken McCaw** (Lib)	
Lismore	Labor	**Keith Compton**	William Blair (CP)	John Antill (DLP)
Liverpool	Labor	**Jack Mannix**	John Bridge (Lib)	Kevin Davis (DLP)
Maitland	Liberal	George Lyons	**Milton Morris** (Lib)	
Manly	Liberal		Harry Boyle (Lib)	**Douglas Darby** (Ind Lib)
Manly	Liberal		Harry Boyle (Lib)	John Gillmer (Ind)
Maroubra	Labor	**Bob Heffron**	Alexander Alexander (Lib)	Leslie Bond (Ind)
Marrickville	Labor	**Norm Ryan**	Bruce Fry (Lib)	William McCristal (Ind)
Monaro	Labor	**John Seiffert**	Jack McArthur (Lib)	
Mosman	Liberal		**Pat Morton** (Lib)	Reginald Lawson (DLP)
Mudgee	Labor	**Leo Nott**	Albert Cox (Lib); Edward Punch (CP)	Edward Byrnes (DLP)
Murray	Country	John Hayes	**Joe Lawson** (CP)	
Murrumbidgee	Labor	**George Enticknap**	Sidney Braithwaite (Lib); Alfred Tiffen (CP)	Stanley Axtill (DLP)
Nepean	Labor	Alfred Bennett	**Bill Chapman** (Lib)	
Newcastle	Labor	**Frank Hawkins**	Kevin Doyle (Lib)	Mervyn Copley (CPA)
Orange	Country	Allan Reed	**Charles Cutler** (CP)	
Oxley	Liberal	Joseph Andrews	**Les Jordan** (Lib)	William Kennewell (Ind)
Oxley	Liberal	Joseph Andrews	Bruce Cowan (CP)	William Kennewell (Ind)
Parramatta	Labor	**Dan Mahoney**	Marion Hearnshaw (Lib)	
Phillip	Labor	**Pat Hills**	Jean Wood (Lib)	Joy Williams (CPA)
Raleigh	Country	Trevor Owens	**Jim Brown** (CP)	
Randwick	Labor	Lionel Bowen	Adrian Molloy (Lib)	Charles De Monchaux (DLP)
Redfern	Labor	**Fred Green**	Peter Kamperogianis (Lib)	Harry Hatfield (CPA)
Rockdale	Labor	**Brian Bannon**	Sidney Alewood (Lib)	Brian Adams (DLP)
Ryde	Labor	**Frank Downing**	Edward Hall (Lib)	
South Coast	Liberal	John Edward Seiffert	**Jack Beale** (Lib)	Charles Shirley (Ind Lib)
Sturt	Labor	**William Wattison**	Edward Brown (CP)	
Sutherland	Labor	**Tom Dalton**	Noel Walker (Lib)	Keith Bates (Ind); John Mantova (Ind); Malcolm Towner (DLP)
Tamworth	Country	Norman Turner	**Bill Chaffey** (CP)	
Temora	Country	Lyle Hoad	**Jim Taylor** (CP)	
Tenterfield	Country	Eric Potter	Tim Bruxner (CP)	
The Hills	notional Liberal		Max Ruddock (Lib)	**Alfred Dennis** (Ind Lib)
Upper Hunter	Country	Geoffrey Heuston	**Frank O'Keefe** (CP)	
Vaucluse	Liberal		**Geoffrey Cox** (Lib)	Valerie Olsen (DLP)
Wagga Wagga	Liberal	Leonard Brown	**Wal Fife** (Lib)	Anthony Abbey (DLP)
Wakehurst	notional Liberal	John Fisher	Dick Healey (Lib)	Philip Cohen (DLP); Beverley Job (Ind); Edgar Wilson (Ind)
Waratah	Independent	Edward Greaves		**Frank Purdue** (Ind)
Wentworthville	notional Labor	Ernie Quinn	Graham Cullis (Lib)	Montague Bennett (Ind)
Willoughby	Liberal		**George Brain** (Lib)	
Wollondilly	Liberal	Jack Wharton	**Tom Lewis** (Lib)	
Wollongong-Kembla	Labor	**Rex Connor**	Jack Hough (Lib)	
Wyong	notional Labor	**Ray Maher**	Kenneth Charters (Lib)	Hugh Ansell (DLP); Harold Turnbull (Ind)
Young	Country	Peter Kelly	**George Freudenstein** (CP)	Ronald Silk (DLP)

== See also ==
- Members of the New South Wales Legislative Assembly, 1962–1965
