= Advance Australia Party =

Advance Australia Party may refer to:

- Advance Australia Party (1988), a defunct political party
- Advance Australia Party (2010), a defunct political party
