= Electoral results for the district of Kirribilli =

Election results for Kirribilli, New South Wales, Australia

Kirribilli, an electoral district of the Legislative Assembly in the Australian state of New South Wales, was created in 1962 and abolished in 1981.

Election	Member	Party
1962	John Waddy	Liberal
1965	John Waddy	Liberal
1968	John Waddy	Liberal
1971	John Waddy	Liberal
1973	John Waddy	Liberal / Independent
1976	Bruce McDonald	Liberal
1978	Bruce McDonald	Liberal

== Election results ==
=== Elections in the 1970s ===
==== 1978 ====
1978 New South Wales state election: Kirribilli
Party	Candidate	Votes	%	±%
Liberal	Bruce McDonald	11,965	53.8	+11.2
Labor	Glen Batchelor	10,280	46.2	+9.8
Total formal votes		22,245	96.9	−1.7
Informal votes		712	3.1	+1.7
Turnout		22,957	86.6	−2.4
Liberal hold		Swing	−7.3	

==== 1976 ====
1976 New South Wales state election: Kirribilli
Party	Candidate	Votes	%	±%
Liberal	Bruce McDonald	10,593	42.7	−16.5
Labor	Patrick Healy	9,050	36.4	+2.0
Independent	John Waddy	4,343	17.5	+17.5
Workers	David Rennie	732	3.0	+3.0
Independent	Romaulds Kemps	121	0.5	+0.5
Total formal votes		24,839	98.6	+1.1
Informal votes		359	1.4	−1.1
Turnout		25,198	89.0	+4.1
Two-party-preferred result
Liberal	Bruce McDonald	15,176	61.1	−3.2
Labor	Patrick Healy	9,663	38.9	+3.2
Liberal hold		Swing	−3.2	

John Waddy was the sitting member for Kirribilli but was denied Liberal pre-selection and stood for the seat as an independent.

==== 1973 ====
1973 New South Wales state election: Kirribilli
Party	Candidate	Votes	%	±%
Liberal	John Waddy	13,981	59.2	+4.1
Labor	Irene Anderson	8,124	34.4	+4.3
Democratic Labor	Margaret Colman	1,521	6.4	−5.4
Total formal votes		23,626	97.5	
Informal votes		609	2.5	
Turnout		24,235	84.9	
Two-party-preferred result
Liberal	John Waddy	15,198	64.3	−1.7
Labor	Irene Anderson	8,428	35.7	+1.7
Liberal hold		Swing	−1.7	

==== 1971 ====
1971 New South Wales state election: Kirribilli
Party	Candidate	Votes	%	±%
Liberal	John Waddy	13,171	55.1	−7.0
Labor	William Harkness	7,200	30.1	−2.2
Democratic Labor	Michael Fitzpatrick	2,814	11.8	+6.2
Independent	Romaulds Kemps	708	3.0	+3.0
Total formal votes		23,893	97.6	
Informal votes		575	2.4	
Turnout		24,468	87.2	
Two-party-preferred result
Liberal	John Waddy	15,776	66.0	−0.6
Labor	William Harkness	8,117	34.0	+0.6
Liberal hold		Swing	−0.6	

=== Elections in the 1960s ===
==== 1968 ====
1968 New South Wales state election: Kirribilli
Party	Candidate	Votes	%	±%
Liberal	John Waddy	15,534	62.1	+10.5
Labor	Alan Newbury	8,079	32.3	−6.4
Democratic Labor	Luigi Lamprati	1,410	5.6	+5.6
Total formal votes		25,023	96.9	
Informal votes		797	3.1	
Turnout		25,820	90.7	
Two-party-preferred result
Liberal	John Waddy	16,662	66.6	+3.6
Labor	Alan Newbury	8,361	33.4	−3.6
Liberal hold		Swing	+3.6	

==== 1965 ====
1965 New South Wales state election: Kirribilli
Party	Candidate	Votes	%	±%
Liberal	John Waddy	10,318	51.6	+2.0
Labor	James Cahill	7,727	38.7	−6.4
Independent	Nicholas Gorshenin	1,934	9.7	+9.7
Total formal votes		19,979	97.8	−0.4
Informal votes		457	2.2	+0.4
Turnout		20,436	90.8	−0.6
Two-party-preferred result
Liberal	John Waddy	11,285	56.5	+3.4
Labor	James Cahill	8,694	43.5	−3.4
Liberal hold		Swing	+3.4	

==== 1962 ====
1962 New South Wales state election: Kirribilli
Party	Candidate	Votes	%	±%
Liberal	John Waddy	11,106	49.6	
Labor	Joseph Hazell	10,105	45.1	
Democratic Labor	Sydney Mostyn	1,181	5.3	
Total formal votes		22,392	98.2	
Informal votes		416	1.8	
Turnout		22,808	91.4	
Two-party-preferred result
Liberal	John Waddy	11,898	53.1	
Labor	Joseph Hazell	10,494	46.9	
Liberal notional hold		Swing	N/A	

- Kirribilli was a new seat that was notionally a safe Liberal seat.
