= 1956 Cunningham by-election =

A by-election for the Australian House of Representatives seat of Cunningham was triggered by the death, on 17 February 1956, of Labor MP Billy Davies. However, by the close of nominations on 11 April only one candidate, Labor's Victor Kearney, had nominated. Kearney was thus declared elected unopposed. This was the last time a federal MP was elected unopposed, with the exception of members for the Northern Territory who did not have full voting rights at this time.

== Results ==
1956 Cunningham by-election
Party	Candidate	Votes	%	±%
Labor	Victor Kearney	unopposed		
Labor hold		Swing		
