= Advance Australia Party (1988) =

- Leader: Rex Connor Jnr
- Founded: 1988
- Dissolved: 2005
- Headquarters: Wollongong NSW 2500
- Ideology: Australian nationalism Populism

Website
- n/a

The Advance Australia Party (AAP), founded in 1988 as the Rex Connor Labor Party, was a minor political party in Australia. It was a populist party founded on a platform of Australian nationalism.

== History ==
The party was founded in 1988 by Rex Connor Jr, the son of former Whitlam government minister, Rex Connor, after leaving the Australian Labor Party. The party was formed in opposition to the embracing of social and economic liberalism by the Liberal and Labor parties. It was registered on 14 July 1989, but deregistered by the Australian Electoral Commission on 5 December 2005 for failing to endorse a candidate in the previous four years.

Connor contested the 1990 federal election in the seat of Cunningham and received 12.8% of the vote, contesting Throsby in 1993 and received 10.48% of the vote. The party last contested a federal election in 2001.

As of 2006, the president of AAP was Rex Connor Jr.

== New South Wales party ==
A party of the same name was formed in 2019 to contest the New South Wales state election. According to its website, the leader was Ray Brown, a former deputy mayor of The Hills Shire Council. Brown was also leader of the Building Australia Party.
