= Baden Powell (politician) =

Australian politician

Personal details
- Born: 13 March 1900 Mountain Ash, Rhondda Cynon Taf, Wales
- Died: 25 November 1955 (aged 55) Wollongong, New South Wales
- Party: Labor Party

Arthur Redvers Baden Powell (13 March 1900 – 25 November 1955) was an Australian politician and a member of the New South Wales Legislative Assembly for 3 months in 1950. He was a member of the Labor Party.

== Early life ==
Powell was born in Mountain Ash, Rhondda Cynon Taf, Wales and was the son of a coalminer. He was educated to elementary level in Wales and worked as a miner there until he emigrated to Australia with his parents in 1927. In Australia, he became active in the Labor Party and worked as an ironworker at the Wollongong Steelworks until 1932. He then became the secretary for Billy Davies, a Labor member of the Legislative Assembly for a number of seats in the Illawarra region between 1917 and 1949. Following his retirement from parliament, Powell became a boiler attendant.

== Name ==
The surname Powell is generally regarded as a Welsh name.

The name Baden had been a given name in a Powell family (from Mildenhall, Suffolk) since 1731, when Susannah Powell née Thistlethwayte (1696–1762) gave to her child (1731–1792) the maiden name of her mother, Susannah Baden (1663–1692). The name Baden, particularly when associated with the surname Powell, became famous in 1900–1901, the year Arthur William Baden Powell was born, because of the Siege of Mafeking, the most famous British action in the Second Boer War, which turned the British Commander of the besieged, Robert Baden-Powell, into a national hero. Throughout the British Empire, babies were named after him. No family connection has yet been established between Arthur Redvers Baden Powell and Robert Baden-Powell.

Redvers was also the name of another General made famous during that War, Sir Redvers Buller

== State Parliament ==
Powell was elected to parliament as the Labor member for Wollongong-Kembla at the January 1950 by-election caused by the resignation of the incumbent Labor member, Billy Davies, who successfully contested the seat of Cunningham at the 1949 federal election. In a normally safe Labor seat, in which Davies had usually been elected unopposed, Powell was strongly challenged by the Liberal's Gerald Sargent. He eventually won the by-election by 261 votes, a margin of 0.84%. This narrow victory presaged the statewide swing against Labor at the 1950 election 3 months later but it also weakened Powell's position within the local Labor Party. He lost the Labor pre-selection ballot for the 1950 election to Rex Connor, who would eventually become the federal member for Cunningham and a minister in the government of Gough Whitlam. Powell did not contest the election and retired from state politics. He did not hold party, parliamentary or ministerial office.

New South Wales Legislative Assembly
Preceded by Billy Davies	Member for Wollongong-Kembla; 1950	Succeeded by Rex Connor
