= 1977 Cunningham by-election =

A by-election was held for the Australian House of Representatives seat of Cunningham on 15 October 1977. It was triggered by the death of former Whitlam Government minister and Labor MP Rex Connor.

The by-election was won by Labor candidate Stewart West.

== Results ==
1977 Cunningham by-election
Party	Candidate	Votes	%	±%
Labor	Stewart West	36,425	56.4	−5.3
Liberal	Thomas Griffin	20,748	32.1	−4.3
Democrats	Ross Sampson	5,011	7.8	+7.8
Independent	Rudolph Dezelin	1,136	1.8	+1.8
Total formal votes		64,556	97.2	
Informal votes		1,888	2.8	
Turnout		66,444	86.7	
Two-party-preferred result
Labor	Stewart West		60.7	−1.9
Liberal	Thomas Griffin		39.3	+1.9
Labor hold		Swing	−1.9	

Rex Connor (Labor) died.
