= Stewart West =

Australian politician (1934–2023)

The Honourable Stewart West
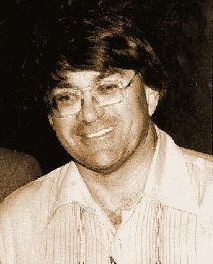
- West in 1978

Minister for Administrative Services
- In office 24 July 1987 – 4 April 1990
- Prime Minister: Bob Hawke
- Preceded by: Tom Uren
- Succeeded by: Nick Bolkus

Minister for Housing and Construction
- In office 13 December 1984 – 24 July 1987
- Prime Minister: Bob Hawke
- Preceded by: Chris Hurford
- Succeeded by: Peter Morris

Minister for Immigration and Ethnic Affairs
- In office 11 March 1983 – 13 December 1984
- Prime Minister: Bob Hawke
- Preceded by: John Hodges
- Succeeded by: Chris Hurford

Member of the Australian Parliament for Cunningham
- In office 15 October 1977 – 8 February 1993
- Preceded by: Rex Connor
- Succeeded by: Stephen Martin

Personal details
- Born: 31 March 1934 Forbes, New South Wales, Australia
- Died: 29 March 2023 (aged 88)
- Party: Labor

Stewart John West (31 March 1934 – 29 March 2023) was an Australian politician. He represented the Australian Labor Party (ALP) in the House of Representatives from 1977 to 1993, holding the New South Wales seat of Cunningham. He was a member of cabinet in the Hawke government, serving as Minister for Immigration and Ethnic Affairs (1983–1984), Housing and Construction (1984–1987), and Administrative Services (1987–1990).

== Early life ==
West was born on 31 March 1934 in Forbes, New South Wales. Before entering parliament he was president of the Port Kembla branch of the Waterside Workers' Federation from 1972 to 1977. He also served as Rex Connor's campaign manager from 1966 to 1975.

== Politics ==
West was elected to parliament in the Cunningham by-election on 15 October 1977, after the sudden death of the sitting member, Rex Connor. He was promoted to the shadow ministry of Bill Hayden in 1980.

When the Labor Party won government in the 1983 federal election, West was appointed Minister for Immigration and Ethnic Affairs in the Cabinet under Prime Minister Bob Hawke. As the only member of Labor's left-wing faction to be a Cabinet minister, West found himself at odds with the Labor Right-dominated Cabinet, and he resigned on 4 November 1983 when he was unable to support a Cabinet decision on uranium mining. He was reappointed to Cabinet on 3 April 1984, and served out the remaining parliamentary term as Immigration Minister.

West remained in Cabinet for the Hawke government's two subsequent terms as Minister for Housing and Construction from 1984 to 1987, and Minister for Administrative Services from 1987 to 1990. He resigned from Parliament on 8 February 1993 after losing pre-selection for the seat of Cunningham to Stephen Martin.

West died on 29 March 2023, two days before his 89th birthday.

Political offices
Preceded by John Hodges	Minister for Immigration and Ethnic Affairs; 1983–1984	Succeeded by Chris Hurford
Preceded by Chris Hurford	Minister for Housing and Construction; 1984–1987	Succeeded by Peter Morris; Housing and Aged Care
Preceded by Tom Uren; Local Government and Administrative Services	Minister for Administrative Services; 1987–1990	Succeeded by Nick Bolkus
Parliament of Australia
Preceded by Rex Connor	Member for Cunningham; 1977–1993	Succeeded by Stephen Martin
