= Victor Kearney =

Australian politician

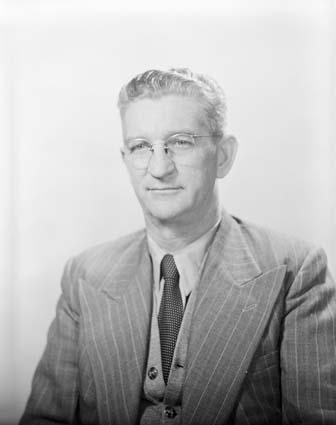

Member of the Australian Parliament for Cunningham
- In office 1 April 1956 – 1 November 1963
- Preceded by: Billy Davies
- Succeeded by: Rex Connor

Personal details
- Born: 10 December 1903 Armidale, New South Wales
- Died: 21 January 1982 (aged 78)
- Party: Australian Labor Party
- Occupation: Unionist

Victor Dennis Kearney (10 December 1903 – 21 January 1982) was an Australian politician born in Armidale, New South Wales, and educated there at De la Salle College, who became an organiser of the Australian Workers' Union and then secretary of the Canberra Trades and Labour Council.

In 1956, Kearney was elected unopposed to the Australian House of Representatives seat of Cunningham, representing the Labor Party, in the by-election caused by the death of Billy Davies. This was the last time a member with full voting rights was returned unopposed to the House.

Kearney held the seat until he retired in 1963, although he unsuccessfully tried to regain Cunningham as an independent in 1966. Later, having moved to Queensland, he became a member of the Democratic Labor Party, contesting the seat of McPherson for the DLP in 1972. He died in 1982.

Parliament of Australia
Preceded by Billy Davies	Member for Cunningham; 1956–1963	Succeeded by Rex Connor
