= Alison Byrnes =

Australian politician (born 1974)

Alison Byrnes MP

Member of the Australian Parliament for Cunningham
- Incumbent
- Assumed office 21 May 2022
- Preceded by: Sharon Bird

Personal details
- Born: Alison Joy Byrnes; 5 February 1974 (age 52) Wollongong, New South Wales, Australia
- Party: Labor
- Spouse: Paul Scully
- Education: Woonona High School
- Alma mater: University of Wollongong (MMgmt)
- Occupation: Politician
- Website: alisonbyrnesmp.com.au

Alison Joy Byrnes (born 5 February 1974) is an Australian politician. She is a member of the Australian Labor Party (ALP) and was elected as a member for the New South Wales seat of Cunningham in the House of Representatives in the 2022 federal election.

== Early life ==
Byrnes was born on 5 February 1974 in Wollongong, New South Wales. She is the daughter of Petronella and Ron Byrnes; her mother was born in the Netherlands and arrived in Australia as a child.

Byrnes grew up in the suburb of Woonona, attending Woonona Public School and Woonona High School. She holds the degree of Master of Management from the University of Wollongong.

== Politics ==
Byrnes has worked for the ALP since the age of 16. She was a staffer to Cunningham MP Sharon Bird for 18 years, including as chief of staff. Following Bird's retirement, she won ALP preselection for Cunningham in February 2022. She was chosen unopposed following the withdrawal of her main opponent, Misha Zelinsky. At the 2022 federal election, she retained Cunningham for the ALP with 65% of the two-party preferred vote.

== Views ==
=== Local Energy Production and Storage ===
==== Illawarra Offshore Wind Zone ====
Byrnes has advocated for local renewable energy and especially offshore wind power stating that "Unlocking offshore wind in the Illawarra will help to power households, businesses and industries while creating local jobs." During the initial consultation phase of the Illawarra Offshore Wind Zone proposal Byrnes hosted two community consultation sessions in addition to the six sessions run by the Department of Climate Change, Energy, the Environment and Water.

Byrnes released her offshore wind zone submission in favour of the proposal but recommended multiple changes. Byrnes made multiple recommendations including resizing the zone to be no closer than 20 kilometres to shore, offshore wind turbines to be manufactured in Port Kembla using local steel and a community benefit scheme which could be a discount on electricity for local residents or provide a dividend of revenue from the wind farm to local community interests and projects.

On 15 June 2024, the Illawarra Offshore Wind Zone was declared with the new zone being 20 kilometres away from the coast. During the press conference the Minister for Climate Change and Energy, Chris Bowen declined a local steel content quota and local economic benefit plan stating "What I can guarantee is that proposals for licence applications with strong local content plans, whether it be steel or other local economic benefit plans, will receive very strong consideration." and also said "If proponents put in a licence application which doesn't have any community benefit for the Illawarra, they won't be receiving much attention from me."

Byrnes reiterated her support for a community benefit scheme and for local steel content "My expectation is that all proponents not only make sure that their projects meet the highest environmental standards but also incorporate local content, including the use of locally produced steel, and local workforce and develop a strong benefit sharing scheme so that our community meaningfully benefits from hosting an offshore wind farm should one be developed,".

A senate inquiry into the offshore wind zone consultation process passed the senate. In response, Byrnes alongside fellow members of parliament, Stephen Jones and Fiona Phillips made a joint submission into the consultation process and the broader community awareness of the Illawarra Offshore Wind Zone.

==== Community batteries ====
During the 2022 Australian federal election, Byrnes supported the establishment of community batteries in Dapto and Warrawong. In 2023, it was announced that Endeavour Energy would receive $1 million in funding to build a 720 kilowatt hour battery in Warrawong and a 1040 kilowatt hour battery in Dapto.

== Personal life ==
Byrnes is married to Paul Scully, an ALP member of the New South Wales Legislative Assembly. She has sometimes used the name "Alison Byrnes-Scully".

== See also ==
- Women in the Australian House of Representatives

Parliament of Australia
Preceded by Sharon Bird	Member for Cunningham; 2022–present	Incumbent
