= Jess Moore =

Jess Moore is an Australian activist who is a founding member and spokesperson of Stop CSG Illawarra, an independent community group campaigning for a freeze on coal seam gas development in NSW until a Royal Commission can investigate the industry. She has been involved in a range of other community campaigns for social & ecological justice including renewable energy development, rights for Aboriginal communities, marriage equality and more.

She was President of the Wollongong Undergraduate Students' Association in 2006 and was the national co-ordinator of Resistance, in 2010. In 2011, Moore won the Nature Conservation Council of New South Wales “Rising Star” award for being the “most outstanding campaigner under the age of 30” for her role in the campaign to stop coal seam gas mining and other campaigns to protect the environment and water resources.
