= Doug Porter (politician) =

Australian politician

Douglas Elliott Porter (24 January 1916 – 27 August 1989) was an Australian politician. He was a Labor Party member of the New South Wales Legislative Assembly from 1964 to 1965, representing the electorate of Wollongong-Kembla.

Porter was born at Mosman, and was a plumber by trade. He worked as a teacher at Sydney and East Sydney Technical Colleges from 1947 to 1953, St George Technical College in 1953, before relocating to Wollongong in 1954 to teach at Wollongong Technical College. He was elected as an alderman of the City of Wollongong council in 1963, holding the position until 1971. He was also involved in the local Labor Party, serving as secretary of the party's Reidtown branch.

In 1964, local MLA Rex Connor resigned his state seat to run for the federal seat of Cunningham, and Porter won Labor preselection for the resulting by-election. Though a traditionally safe Labor seat, Labor suffered a massive swing at the by-election, and Porter defeated Liberal candidate Jack Hough by only 200 votes. He faced re-election just over a year later, and narrowly lost to Hough, in a result that helped ensure the election of the Askin Liberal government.

Porter continued his involvement in local politics after his state defeat, and after initially returning to teaching, purchased a hardware store in 1966. He died at Kogarah in 1989.

New South Wales Legislative Assembly
Preceded by Rex Connor	Member for Wollongong-Kembla; 1964 – 1965	Succeeded by Jack Hough
