= Sharon Bird =

Australian politician (born 1962)

The Honourable Sharon Bird

Minister for Regional Development
- In office 1 July 2013 – 18 September 2013
- Prime Minister: Kevin Rudd
- Preceded by: Anthony Albanese (as Minister for Regional Development and Local Government)
- Succeeded by: Warren Truss (as Minister for Infrastructure and Regional Development)

Minister for Regional Communications
- In office 1 July 2013 – 18 September 2013
- Prime Minister: Kevin Rudd
- Preceded by: New portfolio
- Succeeded by: Fiona Nash

Minister for Road Safety
- In office 1 July 2013 – 18 September 2013
- Prime Minister: Kevin Rudd
- Preceded by: Catherine King
- Succeeded by: Jamie Briggs (as Assistant Minister for Infrastructure and Regional Development)

Minister for Higher Education and Skills
- In office 25 March 2013 – 1 July 2013
- Prime Minister: Julia Gillard
- Preceded by: New portfolio
- Succeeded by: Sussan Ley (as Assistant Minister for Education)

Member of the Australian Parliament for Cunningham
- In office 9 October 2004 – 11 April 2022
- Preceded by: Michael Organ
- Succeeded by: Alison Byrnes

Personal details
- Born: Sharon Leah Reed; 15 November 1962 (age 63) Wollongong, New South Wales, Australia
- Party: Australian Labor Party
- Domestic partner: Gino Mandarino
- Children: 2
- Education: University of Sydney; University of Wollongong
- Occupation: Teacher
- Website: www.sharonbird.com.au

Sharon Leah Bird (née Reed, born 15 November 1962) is an Australian former politician. Bird served as an Australian Labor Party (ALP) member of the Australian House of Representatives, representing the Division of Cunningham in New South Wales from 2004 to 2022. She served as a minister during the late Gillard-Rudd years until Labor lost government at the next election. She served as the Shadow Minister for Vocational Education from October 2013 until July 2016. In 2021, Bird announced she would not be re-contesting at the 2022 Federal Election, retiring from politics.

== Background and early career ==
Bird was born in Wollongong, and was educated at the University of Sydney and the University of Wollongong. She was a TAFE and high-school teacher before entering politics. She worked as an electorate officer for Colin Hollis, the member for the adjoining seat of Throsby, and was then a Senior Project Officer with the New South Wales Department of Juvenile Justice. Bird was a member of the Shellharbour Council between 1991 and 1995.

== Political career ==
Bird first contested the seat of Cunningham at the 2002 by-election held following the resignation of Labor's Stephen Martin. Despite Bird polling 38.13% of the primary vote, the Australian Greens' Michael Organ won the seat on a two-party-preferred basis.

Bird contested Cunningham again in the 2004 general election. Although she took a large early lead, she was unable to secure victory until Organ was eliminated and his preferences flowed overwhelmingly to her, allowing her to win on the 10th count.

On 2 March 2012, Bird was appointed as Parliamentary Secretary for Higher Education and Skills, and was promoted as Minister for Higher Education and Skills in a rearrangement of the Second Gillard Ministry on 25 March 2013. In July 2013, Bird was appointed as the Minister for Regional Development, the Minister for Regional Communications and the Minister for Road Safety in the Second Rudd Ministry.

Bird is a supporter of same-sex marriage, voting in favour on the issue three times.

On 19 November 2021, Bird announced that she would not be contesting the 2022 election, retiring after 18 years as the member for Cunningham.

== See also ==
- Second Gillard Ministry
- Second Rudd Ministry

Parliament of Australia
| Preceded by Michael Organ | Member for Cunningham; 2004–2022 | Succeeded by Alison Byrnes |
Political offices
| Preceded by Anthony Albanese as Minister for Regional Development and Local Government | Minister for Regional Development; 2013 | Succeeded by Warren Truss as Minister for Infrastructure and Regional Development |
| New ministerial post | Minister for Regional Communications; 2013 | Vacant Title next held by Fiona Nash |
| Preceded by Catherine King | Minister for Road Safety; 2013 | Succeeded by Jamie Briggs as Assistant Minister for Infrastructure and Regional Development |
| New ministerial post | Minister for Higher Education and Skills; 2013 | Vacant Title next held by Sussan Ley as Assistant Minister for Education |
