= Howard Fowles =

Australian politician

Personal details
- Born: 24 January 1894 Merrylands, New South Wales
- Died: 17 May 1973 (aged 79) Port Macquarie, New South Wales
- Party: Labor Party

Howard Thomas Fowles (24 January 1894 – 17 May 1973) was an Australian politician. He was a member of the New South Wales Legislative Assembly from 1941 until 1968 and a member of the Labor Party (ALP) . He was the acting Speaker of the New South Wales Legislative Assembly for 3 months in 1962.

Fowles was born in Merrylands, New South Wales. He was the son of a blacksmith, was educated to elementary level at state schools. From the age of 14 he worked as a linesman for the New South Wales Government Railways and was an official in the Electrical Trades Union until 1941. In later life, he was also a poultry farmer. Fowles was elected to the New South Wales Parliament as the Labor member for the seat of Illawarra at the 1941 state election. . The sitting Labor member Billy Davies successfully contested the new seat of Wollongong-Kembla at that election. He retained the seat for the next 8 elections and retired at the 1968 state election.

New South Wales Legislative Assembly
Preceded by Billy Davies	Member for Illawarra; 1941–1968	Succeeded by George Petersen
