= 1962 New South Wales state election =

State election for New South Wales, Australia in March 1962

- 3 March 1962

All 94 seats in the New South Wales Legislative Assembly 48 Assembly seats were needed for a majority
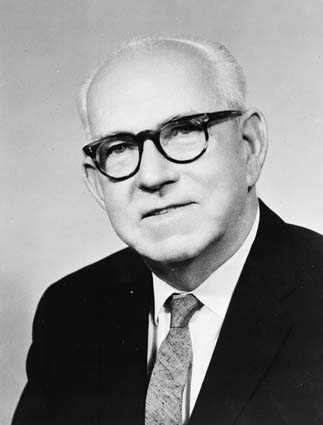

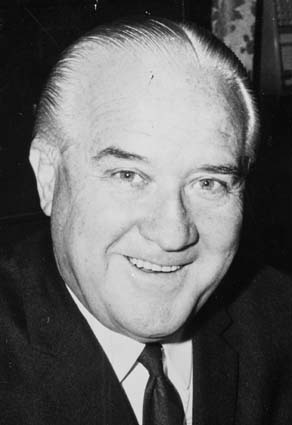
	First party	Second party
Leader	Bob Heffron	Bob Askin
Party	Labor	Liberal/Country coalition
Leader since	23 October 1959	17 July 1959
Leader's seat	Maroubra	Collaroy
Last election	49 seats	44 seats
Seats won	54	39
Seat change	▲5	▼5
Percentage	48.57%	44.22%
Swing	▼0.55	▲0.16
- Two-candidate-preferred margin by electorate
Premier before election
Bob Heffron
Labor
Elected Premier
Bob Heffron
Labor

The 1962 New South Wales state election was held on 3 March 1962. It was conducted in single member constituencies with compulsory preferential voting and was held on boundaries created at a 1961 redistribution. The election was for all of the 94 seats in the Legislative Assembly.

== Redistribution ==
A redistribution of electoral boundaries was undertaken in 1961 based on that year's Australian Census. The redistribution reflected the continuing relative population shifts from the Country and Eastern suburbs of Sydney to Western Sydney and the Central Coast. The Hunter Valley seat of Liverpool Plains, held by the Country Party was abolished while in the eastern suburbs the safe Liberal seat of Woollahra and the safe Labor seat of Paddington-Waverley were combined to form the marginal seat of Bligh. In Northern Sydney, the marginal Labor seat of North Sydney and the safe Liberal seat of Neutral Bay were combined to form the relatively safe Liberal seat of Kirribilli. Wakehurst was created in the Northern Beaches area with a notional Liberal majority and on the Central Coast, the seat of Wyong was established and was expected to have a large Labor majority. In Western Sydney the seats of Merrylands and Leichhardt were abolished and replaced by the safe Labor seats of Wentworthville and Bass Hill. The seat of The Hills was established in North-west Sydney mainly from the northern portion of Blacktown and this made Blacktown a safe Labor seat. While the theoretical effect of the redistribution was to increase the Liberal numbers by 1 at the expense of the Country Party, the boundary changes significantly improved Labor's position in several seats including Nepean, Coogee and Drummoyne. Joan Rydon estimated that the coalition would have needed 52% of the overall vote to win office.

== Key dates ==
Date	Event
5 February 1962	The Legislative Assembly was dissolved, and writs were issued by the Governor to proceed with an election.
9 February 1962	Nominations for candidates for the election closed at noon.
3 March 1962	Polling day.
14 March 1962	Second Heffron ministry sworn in.
6 April 1962	Last day for the writs to be returned and the results formally declared.
10 April 1962	Opening of 40th Parliament.

== Issues ==
In March 1962, Labor had been in power for 21 years and Robert Heffron had been premier for 2 and a half years. Heffron was 72 at the time of the election and his age and the longevity of the government were made issues by the opposition which described it as being composed of "tired old men". The prestige of Heffron's government had suffered when the electors clearly rejected its proposal to abolish the New South Wales Legislative Council at a referendum in April 1961. Labor's new policies for the election included the establishment of a Department of Industrial Development to reduce unemployment, free school travel, aid to home buyers and commencing the construction of the Sydney–Newcastle Freeway as a toll-road.

In contrast to Labor the leader of the conservative coalition, Robin Askin put forward a positive program and addressed contentious issues including the introduction of State Aid for private schools, making rent control fairer and the legalisation of off-course betting on horse races. Askin accused the state government of allowing the transport infrastructure of the state to decline. He promised to build the Newcastle freeway without a toll, to construct the Eastern Suburbs Railway and to plan for a second crossing of Sydney Harbour. Askin also promised more resources for mental health and district hospitals.

== Results ==
The Labor government's position improved substantially at this election. It had a buffer of 7 seats in the new parliament:

Prior to the election Labor had gained the seat of Lismore from the Country Party at a by-election after the Court of Disputed Returns ruling the 1959 election result invalid. Labor had lost the seat of Liverpool Plains to the Country Party at a by-election caused by the resignation of Roger Nott. However, Liverpool Plains was abolished by the redistribution at this election. In Oxley the sitting member, Les Jordan changed his allegiance from the Country Party to the Liberal Party,

Labor regained the seat of Waratah from the independent incumbent Frank Purdue and, as expected, won the new seats of Wyong, Wentworthville, Bass Hill and Bligh. Labor also gained Blacktown, Nepean, Drummoyne and Coogee from the Liberals.

The Liberal Party won the new seats of Kirribilli, Wakehurst and The Hills. In Manly, the sitting Liberal member Douglas Darby, who had lost his party's pre-selection, successfully contested the seat as an Independent Liberal.

The DLP and the Communist party both performed poorly, each party gained less than 2% of the primary vote.

Non-elected Premier Bob Heffron was elected his own right as Premier and would be the last non-elected Premier to achieve this until Morris Iemma in 2007.

New South Wales state election, 3 March 1962 Legislative Assembly << 1959–1965 >>
Enrolled voters	2,173,768 (Note: There were 2,082,320 enrolled voters in 90 contested electorates and 91,448 were enrolled in 4 uncontested electorates (2 Labor, 2 Liberal).)				
Votes cast	1,957,406		Turnout	94.00	+0.00
Informal votes	30,048		Informal	1.54	−0.29
Summary of votes by party
Party	Primary votes	%	Swing	Seats	Change
Labor	936,047	48.57	−0.55	54	+5
Liberal	671,716	34.85	−0.50	25	−3
Country	180,640	9.37	+0.66	14	−2
Independent	60,420	3.13	−0.50	0	−1
Independent Liberal	37,555	1.95	+1.95	1	+1
Democratic Labor	28,830	1.50	+0.18	0	−
Communist	12,150	0.63	−0.82	0	−
Total	1,927,358			94	

Popular vote
Labor	48.57%
Liberal	34.85%
Country	9.37%
Independents	5.08%
Democratic Labor	1.50%
Communist	0.63%
Parliamentary seats
Labor	54
Liberal	25
Country	14
Independents	1

== Retiring members ==
=== Labor ===
- Keith Anderson (Paddington-Waverley) — lost preselection for Bligh.
- William Gollan (Randwick)
- Bill Lamb (Granville) — lost preselection.
- Spence Powell (Bankstown)
- Arthur Tonge (Canterbury) — lost preselection.

=== Liberal ===
- Ivan Black (Neutral Bay)

=== Country ===
- Sir Michael Bruxner (Tenterfield)
- Ray Fitzgerald (Gloucester)

== Seats changing party representation ==
Seat	1959		1962	
Seat	Party	Member	Member	Party
Bass Hill		New seat (Note: Bass Hill, Wentworthville and Wyong were notionally Labor seats.)	Clarrie Earl	Labor
Blacktown	Liberal	Alfred Dennis (Note: Alfred Dennis unsuccessfully contested The Hills as an Independent Liberal.)	Jim Southee	Labor
Bligh		New seat (Note: Wakehurst. Bligh, Kirribilli and The Hills were notionally Liberal seats.)	Tom Morey	Labor
Coogee	Liberal	Kevin Ellis	Lou Walsh	Labor
Drummoyne	Liberal	Walter Lawrence	Reg Coady	Labor
Kirribilli		New seat	John Waddy	Liberal
Leichhardt	Labor	Reg Coady	Seat abolished	
Lismore (Note: The Country Party had won the 1959 election for Lismore by 2 votes, however it was declared void by the Court of Disputed Returns. The resulting by-election was won by Keith Compton (Labor).)	Country		Keith Compton	Labor
Liverpool Plains (Note: Roger Nott (Labor) resigned and Frank O'Keefe (Country) won the resulting by-election.)	Labor		Seat abolished	
Manly	Liberal	Douglas Darby		Independent Liberal
Merrylands	Labor	Jack Ferguson	Seat abolished	
Nepean	Liberal	Bill Chapman	Alfred Bennett	Labor
Neutral Bay	Liberal	Ivan Black	Seat abolished	
North Sydney	Labor	Ray Maher	Seat abolished	
Oxley	Country	Les Jordan		Liberal
Paddington-Waverley	Labor	Keith Anderson	Seat abolished	
The Hills		New seat	Max Ruddock	Liberal
Wakehurst		New seat	Dick Healey	Liberal
Waratah	Independent	Frank Purdue	Edward Greaves	Labor
Wentworthville		New seat	Jack Ferguson	Labor
Woollahra	Liberal	Vernon Treatt	Seat abolished	
Wyong		New seat	Ray Maher	Labor

== Aftermath ==
Robert Heffron resigned in April 1964, aged 74 and was replaced by Jack Renshaw. Robert Askin and Charles Cutler remained as leaders of their respective parties throughout the term of the parliament. During the parliament there were 4 by-elections. These produced no change in party representation with the exception of Labor losing Waratah to the independent former member, Frank Purdue.

== See also ==
- Candidates of the 1962 New South Wales state election
- Members of the New South Wales Legislative Assembly, 1962–1965
