= Billy Davies (politician) =

Australian politician (1884–1956)

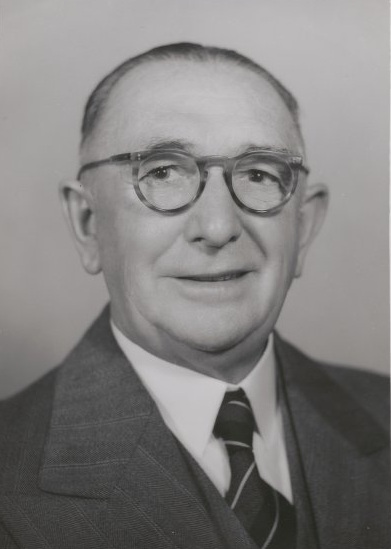

Member of the Australian Parliament for Cunningham
- In office 10 December 1949 – 17 February 1956
- Preceded by: New seat
- Succeeded by: Victor Kearney

Personal details
- Born: 1884 Abertillery, Wales, UK
- Died: 17 February 1956 (aged 71–72) Wollongong, New South Wales, Australia
- Party: Labor Party
- Spouse: Edith Hartshorn
- Children: 2
- Occupation: Miner

William Davies (1884 – 17 February 1956) was an Australian politician, born in Abertillery in Wales to the coalminer William Davies and his wife Mary, née Williams. As a child he worked in the coalmines, but won a miners' scholarship to a summer school at the University of Oxford, where he became a Methodist lay preacher. He married Edith Hartshorn on 4 August 1903 and the couple moved to New South Wales in 1912, when Davies became a miner in the Wollongong area, soon rising to become an official of the Australian Coal and Shale Employees' Federation.

Davies won the New South Wales Legislative Assembly seat of Wollongong in 1917, representing the Labor Party, having defeated the sitting John Nicholson who had been elected as a Labor member but joined the Nationalist Party following the 1916 conscription split. His 1920 election campaign concentrated on the 1917 strike, John Brown's contract compensation, business profiteering and the wheat pool scandal. He went on to dominate Labor politics in the area for the next forty years, and became a loyal supporter of New South Wales Premier Jack Lang, who made Davies Minister of Public Instruction in 1927, and Minister for Education from 1930 until 1932.

In 1949 Davies resigned from the Legislative Assembly in order to contest the new federal seat of Cunningham, which he held until his death on 17 February 1956. He was remembered by H. V. Evatt as "a great orator who had helped to inspire coalminers during industrial troubles".

Parliament of New South Wales
Political offices
Preceded by Thomas Mutch as Minister for Education	Minister of Public Instruction; 1927	Succeeded by David Drummond as Minister for Education
Preceded by David Drummond	Minister for Education; 1930–1932	Succeeded by David Drummond
New South Wales Legislative Assembly
Preceded by John Nicholson	Member for Wollongong; 1917–1920	District abolished
Preceded by George Fuller	Member for Wollondilly; 1920–1927; Served alongside: Fuller, Cleary/Morton/Lysaght	Succeeded by George Fuller
New district	Member for Wollongong; 1927–1930	District abolished
Preceded by Andrew Lysaght	Member for Illawarra; 1930–1941	Succeeded by Howard Fowles
New district	Member for Wollongong-Kembla; 1941–1949	Succeeded by Baden Powell
Australian House of Representatives
New division	Member for Cunningham; 1949–1956	Succeeded by Victor Kearney
