= Division of Cunningham =

Australian federal electoral division

Coordinates: 34.259°S 150.916°E

Cunningham Australian House of Representatives Division
- Interactive map of electorate boundaries from the 2025 federal election
- Created: 1949
- MP: Alison Byrnes
- Party: Labor
- Namesake: Allan Cunningham
- Electors: 132,206 (2025)
- Area: 536 km^{2} (207.0 sq mi)
- Demographic: Provincial
Electorates around Cunningham:
Macarthur	Hughes	South Pacific Ocean
Hume	Cunningham	South Pacific Ocean
Whitlam	Whitlam	South Pacific Ocean

The Division of Cunningham is an Australian electoral division in the state of New South Wales. It is located in the Illawarra and includes all of the City of Wollongong except for some suburbs around Dapto.

== History ==
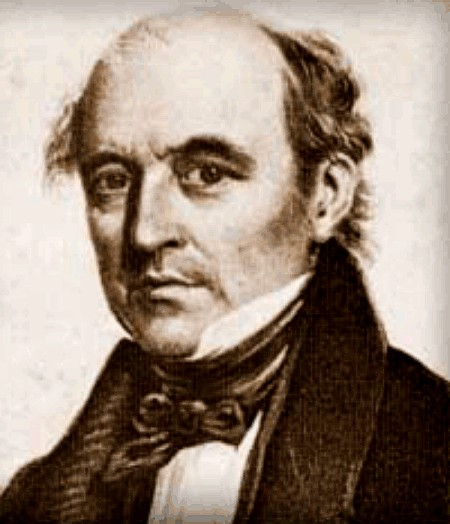
Allan Cunningham, the division's namesake

The division was created in 1949 and is named for Allan Cunningham, a 19th-century explorer of New South Wales and Queensland.

The division has always been represented by the Australian Labor Party, except following the 2002 by-election when the Greens won the seat; being the first time that the Greens held a seat in the House of Representatives. Labor recovered the seat at the 2004 federal election.

Its most prominent members have been Rex Connor, a senior minister in the Whitlam government, and Stephen Martin, who was Speaker of the Australian House of Representatives from 1993 to 1996, during the last term of the Keating government. The sitting member is Alison Byrnes who was elected in the 2022 federal election as a member of the Australian Labor Party.

== Geography ==
Cunningham is located on the coast of New South Wales between southern Sydney and Wollongong. It takes in the northern and central and most of the southern suburbs of the City of Wollongong, including Corrimal, Wollongong, Port Kembla, Warrawong and Unanderra. The division covers areas east of the Illawarra escarpment and is bounded by the Tasman Sea to the east. It is bounded to the north by the Royal National Park and to the south by the Wollongong suburbs of Farmborough Heights, Unanderra and Windang. It acquired the suburbs of Primbee, Windang, Cringila, Berkeley as well as the rest of Unanderra and Lake Heights at the 2024 redistribution.

Although the region is primarily rural, the vast majority of the population is in Wollongong and along the eastern seaboard. The main products and means of livelihood in the area are tourism, tertiary education, steel production, coal mining, brick manufacturing, textiles, and services.

Since 1984 federal electoral division boundaries in Australia have been determined at redistributions by a redistribution committee appointed by the Australian Electoral Commission. Redistributions occur for the boundaries of divisions in a particular state, and they occur every seven years, or sooner if a state's representation entitlement changes or when divisions of a state are malapportioned.

== Members ==
Image	Member	Party	Term	Notes
	Billy Davies (1884–1956)	Labor	10 December 1949 – 17 February 1956	Previously held the New South Wales Legislative Assembly seat of Wollongong-Kembla. Died in office
	Victor Kearney (1903–1982)	Labor	1 April 1956 – 1 November 1963	Retired
	Rex Connor (1907–1977)	Labor	30 November 1963 – 22 August 1977	Previously held the New South Wales Legislative Assembly seat of Wollongong-Kembla. Served as minister under Whitlam. Died in office
	Stewart West (1934–2023)	Labor	15 October 1977 – 8 February 1993	Served as minister under Hawke. Lost preselection and retired
	Stephen Martin (1948–)	Labor	13 March 1993 – 16 August 2002	Previously held the Division of Macarthur. Served as Speaker during the Keating Government. Resigned to retire from politics
	Michael Organ (1956–)	Greens	19 October 2002 – 9 October 2004	Lost seat
	Sharon Bird (1962–)	Labor	9 October 2004 – 11 April 2022	Served as minister under Gillard and Rudd. Retired
	Alison Byrnes (1974–)	Labor	21 May 2022 – present	Incumbent

== Election results ==
2025 Australian federal election: Cunningham
Party	Candidate	Votes	%	±%
Labor	Alison Byrnes	51,607	44.69	+3.49
Liberal	Amanda Ivaneza	26,813	23.22	−1.25
Greens	Jess Whittaker	23,584	20.42	−0.24
One Nation	John Fuller	8,765	7.59	+2.23
Animal Justice	Tim Lavers	3,048	2.64	+2.64
Citizens	Alexis Garnaut-Miller	1,657	1.43	+0.45
Total formal votes		115,474	94.60	−0.06
Informal votes		6,586	5.40	+0.06
Turnout		122,060	92.37	+1.57
Two-party-preferred result
Labor	Alison Byrnes	77,970	67.52	+2.45
Liberal	Amanda Ivaneza	37,504	32.48	−2.45
Labor hold		Swing	+2.45	
