= Rex Connor =

Australian politician (1907–1977)

The Honourable Rex Connor
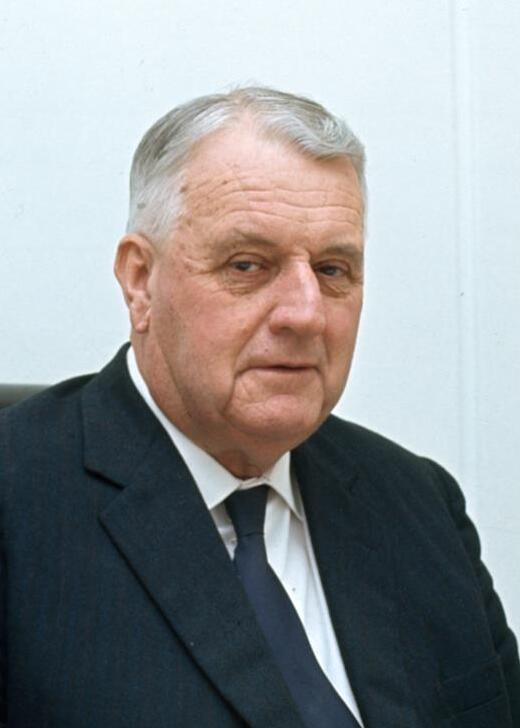
- Connor in 1973

Minister for Minerals and Energy
- In office 19 December 1972 – 14 October 1975
- Prime Minister: Gough Whitlam
- Preceded by: [First holder]
- Succeeded by: Ken Wriedt

Member of the Australian Parliament for Cunningham
- In office 30 November 1963 – 22 August 1977
- Preceded by: Victor Kearney
- Succeeded by: Stewart West

Personal details
- Born: 26 January 1907 Wollongong, New South Wales, Australia
- Died: 22 August 1977 (aged 70) Canberra, Australian Capital Territory, Australia
- Party: Labor
- Spouse: Grace Searl (m. 1931–1977)
- Children: Three sons
- Occupation: Car dealer

Reginald Francis Xavier Connor (26 January 1907 – 22 August 1977) was an Australian politician who served as a member of the House of Representatives from 1963 until he died in 1977, representing the Labor Party. He was the Minister for Minerals and Energy in the Whitlam government from 1972 to 1975.

Connor was born in Wollongong, New South Wales. He served on the Wollongong City Council from 1938 to 1945, and then in the New South Wales Legislative Assembly from 1950 to 1963. After entering federal politics, Connor became an ally of Gough Whitlam, who appointed him to cabinet when Labor won the 1972 election. As Minister for Minerals and Energy, he was noted for his strident economic nationalism. However, Connor is best known as the central figure in the "loans affair", which arose from his attempts to secure petrodollar loans from Middle Eastern financiers. His resignation from cabinet in October 1975 precipitated the constitutional crisis which resulted in Whitlam's dismissal a month later.

Connor died as the sitting member for the Division of Cunningham, precipitating the 1977 Cunningham by-election.

== Early life ==
Connor was born on 26 January 1907 in Wollongong, New South Wales. He was the son of Ethel (née Deegan) and Peter Francis Connor; his father was a labourer.

Connor attended Wollongong High School, of which he graduated as dux despite contracting pneumonia in his final year. He initially intended to pursue a career in analytical chemistry, but after his father's death in 1925 he entered the workforce to support his family. In 1926, Connor began working as an articled clerk under solicitor Charles Morgan. He handled industrial and workers' compensation cases for Morgan, but in 1931 was dismissed after a falling out. He passed the examinations required to practise law but was twice rejected by the Solicitors' Admission Board.

During the Great Depression, Connor established a successful car dealership and employed up to ten staff members. He "frequently clashed with the police over traffic and licensing matters" and was twice convicted of assault – in 1935 for pulling out a ladder from a council employee disconnecting his electricity and in 1938 for striking a customer who complained about the price of a car.

== State politics ==
In 1940, when the NSW ALP was split into three factions, Connor unsuccessfully contested the federal seat of Werriwa for the so-called "Hughes-Evans Labor Party", the left-wing faction which had split from the recently reunified ALP in NSW, led by William (Bill) McKell. Subsequently, some members of the State Labor Party joined the Communist Party of Australia, and some have been shown to have held "dual tickets" throughout the period. He remained in the ALP when most of the Hughes-Evans faction were expelled in 1941.

In 1950 Connor was elected to the New South Wales Legislative Assembly for the seat of Wollongong-Kembla, where he served until 1963. He was partly responsible for the introduction of the state's Clean Air Act 1961. Connor remained a backbencher reportedly as he was not a supporter of the dominant Catholic right-wing of the NSW ALP.

== Federal politics ==
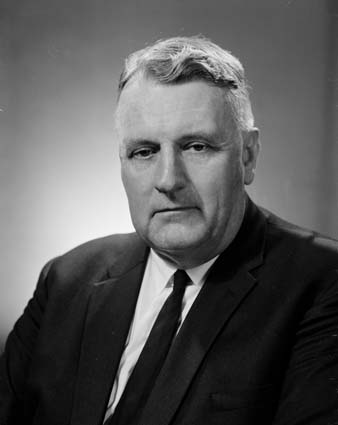
Connor in 1965

In 1963 Connor quit state politics and was elected to the Australian House of Representatives for the Wollongong-based seat of Cunningham at the 1963 election. In Canberra, Connor developed a reputation as an eccentric. A large, shabbily dressed man who always wore a hat long after hats had gone out of fashion, Connor seldom spoke in the House and never spoke to journalists. He kept his real age a secret (several obituarists assumed that he had actually been born no earlier than 1908). After an incident in which he ripped a clock off a wall in Parliament House and threw it across the room in a rage, he was unofficially known as "The Strangler".

== Whitlam government ==
At the 1972 election, Labor came to power under Gough Whitlam, and Connor was elected to the front-bench and appointed Minister for Minerals and Energy. In this portfolio, he sought to develop an Australian-controlled mining and energy sector, one not controlled by the mining companies he disliked. Among his plans were a national energy grid and a gas pipe-line across Australia from the North West Shelf gas fields to the cities of the south-east. He liked to recite a piece of poetry by Sam Walter Foss:

Give me men to match my mountains,
Give me men to match my plains,
Men with freedom in their visions
And creation in their veins.

Connor's economic nationalism was popular with the Labor rank-and-file, and the 1973 oil crisis seemed to many to be a vindication of his views. After the 1974 election he topped the Caucus ballot for the second Whitlam ministry. But the flood of petrodollars which accompanied the energy crisis proved to be Connor's undoing.

During 1974 Connor sought to bypass the usual loan raising processes and raise money in the Middle East through an intermediary, a mysterious Pakistani banker called Tirath Khemlani. Because of strong opposition from the Treasury and the Attorney-General's Department about the legality of the loan (and about Khemlani's general bona fides), Cabinet decided in May 1975 that only the Treasurer, not Connor, was authorised to negotiate foreign loans in the name of the Australian government. Nevertheless, Connor went on negotiating through Khemlani for a huge petrodollar loan for his various development projects, confident that if he succeeded no-one would blame him, and if he failed no-one would know.

The Opposition proclaimed the Loans Affair a "reprehensible circumstance", which justified the blocking of supply in the Senate, leading to the dismissal of the Whitlam government a few weeks later by Governor-General, Sir John Kerr.

The journalist Paul Kelly wrote in his book November 1975: "It was the national interest that drove Rex Connor. He can be criticised for his naivety and poor judgement. But there is no charge against Connor's integrity... The Opposition implied in the lobbies that ministers were chasing personal gain. There is no evidence for this." Nevertheless, by the time Labor returned to office in 1983, Connor's economic nationalism and dreams of massive state investment in energy projects had been totally rejected.

== Personal life ==
In 1931, Connor married Grace Searl, with whom he had three sons. He was widowed in April 1977 a few months before his own death.

Connor died at Royal Canberra Hospital on 22 August 1977, aged 70, following a coronary occlusion. He had been in poor health for two years .

One of his sons, Rex Connor junior, founded and led the Advance Australia Party.

Political offices
New title	Minister for Minerals and Energy; 1972–1975	Succeeded by Ken Wriedt
Parliament of Australia
Preceded by Victor Kearney	Member for Cunningham; 1963–1977	Succeeded by Stewart West
New South Wales Legislative Assembly
Preceded by Baden Powell	Member for Wollongong-Kembla; 1950 – 1963	Succeeded by Doug Porter
