= Electoral district of Wollongong-Kembla =

Former state electoral district of New South Wales, Australia

Wollongong-Kembla was an electoral district of the Legislative Assembly in the Australian state of New South Wales. It was created in 1941 and abolished in 1968, being split into Wollongong and Kembla.

== Members for Wollongong-Kembla ==
Member	Party	Term
Billy Davies	Labor	1941–1949
Baden Powell	Labor	1950–1950
Rex Connor	Labor	1950–1963
Doug Porter	Labor	1964–1965
Jack Hough	Liberal	1965–1968

== Election results ==
1965 New South Wales state election: Wollongong−Kembla
Party	Candidate	Votes	%	±%
Labor	Doug Porter	9,805	46.7	−11.8
Liberal	Jack Hough	9,539	45.4	+3.9
Independent	Andrew Gibson	903	4.3	+4.3
Independent	Peter Barnes	760	3.6	+3.6
Total formal votes		21,007	97.2	−1.2
Informal votes		613	2.8	+1.2
Turnout		21,620	94.8	−1.2
Two-party-preferred result
Liberal	Jack Hough	10,697	50.9	+9.4
Labor	Doug Porter	10,310	49.1	−9.4
Liberal gain from Labor		Swing	+9.4	
