= Results of the 1965 New South Wales state election =

State election for New South Wales, Australia in May 1965

New South Wales state election, 1 May 1965 Legislative Assembly << 1962–1968 >>
Enrolled voters	2,256,568 (Note: There were 2,218,550 enrolled voters in 92 contested electorates and 38,018 were enrolled in 2 uncontested electorates (1 Labor, 1 Country).)				
Votes cast	2,083,361		Turnout	93.91	−0.09
Informal votes	42,571		Informal	2.04	+0.50
Summary of votes by party
Party	Primary votes	%	Swing	Seats	Change
Liberal	807,868	39.59	+4.74	31	+6
Country	208,826	10.23	+0.86	16	+2
Labor	883,824	43.31	−5.26	45	−9
Independent	63,680	3.12	−0.01	1	+1
Democratic Labor	43,109	2.11	−1.02	0	−
Independent Liberal	20,400	1.00	−0.95	1	0
Communist	13,082	0.64	+0.01	0	−
Total	2,040,789			94	

This is a list of electoral district results for the 1965 New South Wales state election.

== Results by electoral district ==
=== Albury ===
1965 New South Wales state election: Albury
Party	Candidate	Votes	%	±%
Labor	Robert White	7,754	38.1	−1.5
Liberal	Gordon Mackie	7,086	34.8	−18.3
Country	James Griffiths	4,463	22.0	+22.0
Democratic Labor	Leo Keane	1,030	5.1	+0.3
Total formal votes		20,333	98.8	−0.3
Informal votes		246	1.2	+0.3
Turnout		20,579	93.5	+0.3
Two-party-preferred result
Liberal	Gordon Mackie	11,960	58.8	+0.6
Labor	Robert White	8,373	41.2	−0.6
Liberal hold		Swing	+0.6	

=== Armidale ===
1965 New South Wales state election: Armidale
Party	Candidate	Votes	%	±%
Country	Davis Hughes	10,775	66.9	+4.4
Labor	Patrick McGee	5,322	33.1	−4.4
Total formal votes		16,097	98.5	−0.1
Informal votes		238	1.5	+0.1
Turnout		16,335	94.8	+0.1
Country hold		Swing	+4.4	

=== Ashfield−Croydon ===
1965 New South Wales state election: Ashfield−Croydon
Party	Candidate	Votes	%	±%
Liberal	David Hunter	14,194	60.5	+4.0
Labor	Wadim Jegorow	8,814	37.6	−5.9
Independent	Raymond Sharrock	445	1.9	+1.9
Total formal votes		23,453	97.9	−0.8
Informal votes		507	2.1	+0.8
Turnout		23,960	92.8	0.0
Two-party-preferred result
Liberal	David Hunter	14,417	61.5	+5.0
Labor	Wadim Jegorow	9,036	38.5	−5.0
Liberal hold		Swing	+5.0	

=== Auburn ===
1965 New South Wales state election: Auburn
Party	Candidate	Votes	%	±%
Labor	Peter Cox	14,804	59.0	−5.9
Liberal	Neil Davis	10,310	41.0	+5.9
Total formal votes		25,114	98.0	−0.7
Informal votes		507	2.0	+0.7
Turnout		25,621	94.6	−0.7
Labor hold		Swing	−5.9	

=== Balmain ===
1965 New South Wales state election: Balmain
Party	Candidate	Votes	%	±%
Labor	John McMahon	13,689	64.5	−9.5
Liberal	Elton Lewis	5,992	28.2	+6.9
Communist	Harry Black	1,530	7.2	+2.5
Total formal votes		21,211	96.9	−0.8
Informal votes		682	3.1	+0.8
Turnout		21,893	94.0	0.0
Two-party-preferred result
Labor	John McMahon	14,913	70.3	−7.4
Liberal	Elton Lewis	6,298	29.7	+7.4
Labor hold		Swing	−7.4	

=== Bankstown ===
1965 New South Wales state election: Bankstown
Party	Candidate	Votes	%	±%
Labor	Nick Kearns	14,025	54.8	−5.1
Liberal	David Cowan	10,540	41.2	+5.9
Communist	Frank Bollins	1,038	4.0	−0.8
Total formal votes		25,603	97.8	−0.7
Informal votes		563	2.2	+0.7
Turnout		26,166	94.1	−0.1
Two-party-preferred result
Labor	Nick Kearns	14,855	58.0	−5.8
Liberal	David Cowan	10,748	42.0	+5.8
Labor hold		Swing	−5.8	

=== Barwon ===
1965 New South Wales state election: Barwon
Party	Candidate	Votes	%	±%
Country	Geoff Crawford	12,084	60.9	+4.3
Labor	Cecil Newton	7,749	39.1	−4.3
Total formal votes		19,833	98.7	−0.5
Informal votes		261	1.3	+0.5
Turnout		20,094	94.2	+0.2
Country hold		Swing	+4.3	

=== Bass Hill ===
1965 New South Wales state election: Bass Hill
Party	Candidate	Votes	%	±%
Labor	Clarrie Earl	13,765	56.0	−7.1
Liberal	William Pardy	9,251	37.6	+8.4
Independent	John Sawyer	1,564	6.4	+6.4
Total formal votes		24,580	97.7	−0.3
Informal votes		574	2.3	+0.3
Turnout		25,154	94.0	+0.3
Two-party-preferred result
Labor	Clarrie Earl	14,703	59.8	−8.7
Liberal	William Pardy	9,877	40.2	+8.7
Labor hold		Swing	−8.7	

=== Bathurst ===
1965 New South Wales state election: Bathurst
Party	Candidate	Votes	%	±%
Labor	Gus Kelly	8,622	52.1	−9.9
Country	Clive Osborne	4,716	28.5	+28.5
Liberal	French Smith	3,199	19.3	−18.7
Total formal votes		16,537	99.1	−0.2
Informal votes		157	0.9	+0.2
Turnout		16,694	95.7	−0.5
Two-party-preferred result
Labor	Gus Kelly	8,878	53.7	−8.3
Country	Clive Osborne	7,659	46.3	+8.3
Labor hold		Swing	−8.3	

=== Blacktown ===
1965 New South Wales state election: Blacktown
Party	Candidate	Votes	%	±%
Labor	Jim Southee	17,361	52.8	−8.9
Liberal	Denys Clarke	14,560	44.2	+5.9
Independent	Malcolm Towner	993	3.0	+3.0
Total formal votes		32,914	97.6	−0.2
Informal votes		822	2.4	+0.2
Turnout		33,736	93.9	−0.3
Two-party-preferred result
Labor	Jim Southee	17,560	53.4	−8.3
Liberal	Denys Clarke	15,354	46.6	+8.3
Labor hold		Swing	−8.3	

=== Bligh ===
1965 New South Wales state election: Bligh
Party	Candidate	Votes	%	±%
Liberal	Morton Cohen	10,391	49.5	+4.2
Labor	Tom Morey	10,069	47.9	−2.3
Democratic Labor	John Kenny	548	2.6	−1.9
Total formal votes		21,008	97.5	−0.7
Informal votes		527	2.5	+0.7
Turnout		21,535	91.7	−0.5
Two-party-preferred result
Liberal	Morton Cohen	10,797	51.4	+2.5
Labor	Tom Morey	10,211	48.6	−2.5
Liberal gain from Labor		Swing	+2.5	

=== Bondi ===
1965 New South Wales state election: Bondi
Party	Candidate	Votes	%	±%
Labor	Abe Landa	11,978	53.6	−5.6
Liberal	John Barraclough	10,356	46.4	+5.6
Total formal votes		22,334	97.8	−0.7
Informal votes		492	2.2	+0.7
Turnout		22,826	92.3	−0.4
Labor hold		Swing	−5.6	

=== Bulli ===
1965 New South Wales state election: Bulli
Party	Candidate	Votes	%	±%
Labor	Rex Jackson	13,654	57.2	−11.1
Liberal	Donald Heggie	6,847	28.7	+2.0
Independent	Mary Hargrave	2,388	10.0	+10.0
Communist	Sara Bowen	988	4.1	−1.0
Total formal votes		23,877	97.9	−0.6
Informal votes		505	2.1	+0.6
Turnout		24,382	95.2	+0.7
Two-party-preferred result
Labor	Rex Jackson	15,996	67.0	−5.3
Liberal	Donald Heggie	7,881	33.0	+5.3
Labor hold		Swing	−5.3	

=== Burrinjuck ===
1965 New South Wales state election: Burrinjuck
Party	Candidate	Votes	%	±%
Labor	Bill Sheahan	9,617	56.0	−1.0
Country	Douglas Boag	5,725	33.3	−9.7
Liberal	Stanley Ablamowicz	1,841	10.7	+10.7
Total formal votes		17,183	99.1	−0.3
Informal votes		162	0.9	+0.3
Turnout		17,345	96.2	+0.5
Two-party-preferred result
Labor	Bill Sheahan	9,727	56.6	−0.4
Country	Douglas Boag	7,456	43.4	+0.4
Labor hold		Swing	−0.4	

=== Burwood ===
1965 New South Wales state election: Burwood
Party	Candidate	Votes	%	±%
Liberal	John Jackett	10,125	42.9	−18.7
Labor	Norman Newey	6,806	28.8	−9.6
Independent	Ben Doig	6,672	28.3	+28.3
Total formal votes		23,603	98.1	−0.2
Informal votes		463	1.9	+0.2
Turnout		24,066	92.4	+0.8
Two-party-preferred result
Liberal	John Jackett	15,734	66.7	+5.1
Labor	Norman Newey	7,869	33.3	−5.1
Liberal hold		Swing	+5.1	

- Ben Doig was the sitting Liberal member for Burwood, however he lost pre-selection which he blamed on his support for state aid to church schools.

=== Byron ===
1965 New South Wales state election: Byron
Party	Candidate	Votes	%	±%
Country	Stanley Stephens	10,644	64.2	+6.0
Labor	James Constable	5,933	35.8	−6.0
Total formal votes		16,577	98.8	−0.6
Informal votes		199	1.2	+0.6
Turnout		16,776	93.9	−0.2
Country hold		Swing	+6.0	

=== Canterbury ===
1965 New South Wales state election: Canterbury
Party	Candidate	Votes	%	±%
Labor	Kevin Stewart	13,355	57.1	−3.0
Liberal	Colin McPhee	10,045	42.9	+3.0
Total formal votes		23,400	97.9	−0.5
Informal votes		500	2.1	+0.5
Turnout		23,900	93.3	−0.7
Labor hold		Swing	−3.0	

=== Casino ===
1965 New South Wales state election: Casino
Party	Candidate	Votes	%	±%
Country	Richmond Manyweathers	unopposed		
Country hold				

=== Castlereagh ===
1965 New South Wales state election: Castlereagh
Party	Candidate	Votes	%	±%
Labor	Jack Renshaw	9,766	54.0	+1.0
Country	Doug Moppett	3,823	21.2	+4.0
Liberal	William Waterford	3,728	20.6	−7.3
Independent	Angus Campbell	756	4.2	+4.2
Total formal votes		18,073	98.9	0.0
Informal votes		204	1.1	0.0
Turnout		18,277	94.3	+0.6
Two-party-preferred result
Labor	Jack Renshaw	10,335	57.2	+2.6
Country	Doug Moppett	7,738	42.8	−2.6
Labor hold		Swing	+2.6	

=== Cessnock ===
1965 New South Wales state election: Cessnock
Party	Candidate	Votes	%	±%
Labor	George Neilly	14,687	77.6	+11.4
Democratic Labor	Hilton Smith	2,709	14.3	+14.3
Communist	Charles Dumbrell	1,543	8.1	+5.1
Total formal votes		18,939	98.0	−1.0
Informal votes		385	2.0	+1.0
Turnout		19,324	95.2	−0.4
Two-candidate-preferred result
Labor	George Neilly	15,921	84.1	−0.1
Democratic Labor	Hilton Smith	3,018	15.9	+15.9
Labor hold		Swing	N/A	

=== Clarence ===
1965 New South Wales state election: Clarence
Party	Candidate	Votes	%	±%
Country	Bill Weiley	14,502	70.5	+16.7
Labor	Philip Parsonage	6,078	29.5	−13.1
Total formal votes		20,580	98.8	−0.4
Informal votes		250	1.2	+0.4
Turnout		20,830	95.4	−0.1
Country hold		Swing	+14.9	

=== Cobar ===
1965 New South Wales state election: Cobar
Party	Candidate	Votes	%	±%
Labor	Lew Johnstone	6,200	45.0	−55.0
Liberal	Allan Connell	5,174	37.5	+37.5
Independent	Douglas McFarlane	1,416	10.3	+10.3
Independent	William Edwards	997	7.2	+7.2
Total formal votes		13,787	97.8	
Informal votes		315	2.2	
Turnout		14,102	89.6	
Two-party-preferred result
Labor	Lew Johnstone	7,636	55.4	−44.6
Liberal	Allan Connell	6,151	44.6	+44.6
Labor hold		Swing	N/A	

=== Collaroy ===
1965 New South Wales state election: Collaroy
Party	Candidate	Votes	%	±%
Liberal	Robert Askin	19,358	73.2	+0.7
Labor	William Bramwell	6,458	24.4	−0.2
Communist	Elfrida Morcom	634	2.4	−0.5
Total formal votes		26,450	98.3	−0.5
Informal votes		453	1.7	+0.5
Turnout		26,903	92.0	−1.3
Two-party-preferred result
Liberal	Robert Askin	19,485	73.7	+0.6
Labor	William Bramwell	6,965	26.3	−0.6
Liberal hold		Swing	+0.6	

=== Concord ===
1965 New South Wales state election: Concord
Party	Candidate	Votes	%	±%
Labor	Thomas Murphy	10,883	47.8	−5.6
Liberal	Lerryn Mutton	10,721	47.1	+3.3
Democratic Labor	William Doherty	1,155	5.1	+2.3
Total formal votes		22,759	97.8	−1.0
Informal votes		509	2.2	+1.0
Turnout		23,268	94.7	+0.5
Two-party-preferred result
Labor	Thomas Murphy	11,425	50.2	−3.7
Liberal	Lerryn Mutton	11,334	49.8	+3.7
Labor hold		Swing	−3.7	

=== Coogee ===
1965 New South Wales state election: Coogee
Party	Candidate	Votes	%	±%
Liberal	Kevin Ellis	10,626	48.0	+2.4
Labor	Lou Walsh	10,547	47.6	−2.1
Democratic Labor	Philip Cohen	972	4.4	−0.3
Total formal votes		22,145	98.3	−0.4
Informal votes		389	1.7	+0.4
Turnout		22,534	91.9	+0.2
Two-party-preferred result
Liberal	Kevin Ellis	11,443	51.7	+2.7
Labor	Lou Walsh	10,702	48.3	−2.7
Liberal gain from Labor		Swing	+2.7	

=== Cook's River ===
1965 New South Wales state election: Cook's River
Party	Candidate	Votes	%	±%
Labor	Thomas Cahill	15,675	69.8	−4.6
Liberal	Louis Mamo	6,774	30.2	+4.6
Total formal votes		22,449	97.5	−0.9
Informal votes		564	2.5	+0.9
Turnout		23,013	94.7	−0.5
Labor hold		Swing	−4.6	

=== Cronulla ===
1965 New South Wales state election: Cronulla
Party	Candidate	Votes	%	±%
Liberal	Ian Griffith	17,023	62.1	+0.9
Labor	Wallace Page	9,528	34.7	−4.1
Communist	Alexander Elphinston	878	3.2	+3.2
Total formal votes		27,429	98.7	−0.3
Informal votes		365	1.3	+0.3
Turnout		27,794	94.9	+0.1
Two-party-preferred result
Liberal	Ian Griffith	17,199	62.7	+1.5
Labor	Wallace Page	10,230	37.3	−1.5
Liberal hold		Swing	+1.5	

=== Drummoyne ===
1965 New South Wales state election: Drummoyne
Party	Candidate	Votes	%	±%
Labor	Reg Coady	11,599	50.8	−2.0
Liberal	George Chambers	10,185	44.6	−2.6
Democratic Labor	Edwin Carr	1,062	4.6	+4.6
Total formal votes		22,846	97.8	−0.8
Informal votes		501	2.2	+0.8
Turnout		23,347	93.7	+0.1
Two-party-preferred result
Labor	Reg Coady	11,811	51.7	−1.1
Liberal	George Chambers	11,035	48.3	+1.1
Labor hold		Swing	−1.1	

=== Dubbo ===
1965 New South Wales state election: Dubbo
Party	Candidate	Votes	%	±%
Labor	Kenneth Mason	6,904	35.0	−3.9
Liberal	John Mason	6,749	34.2	−21.7
Country	Roderick Mack	6,096	30.9	+30.9
Total formal votes		19,749	99.0	−0.1
Informal votes		204	1.0	+0.1
Turnout		19,953	95.6	+1.0
Two-party-preferred result
Liberal	John Mason	12,371	62.6	+4.6
Labor	Kenneth Mason	7,378	37.4	−4.6
Liberal hold		Swing	+4.6	

=== Dulwich Hill ===
1965 New South Wales state election: Dulwich Hill
Party	Candidate	Votes	%	±%
Labor	Cliff Mallam	11,144	54.3	−3.3
Liberal	Russell Carter	9,387	45.7	+3.3
Total formal votes		20,531	98.2	−0.4
Informal votes		381	1.8	+0.4
Turnout		20,912	91.2	−1.2
Labor hold		Swing	−3.3	

=== Earlwood ===
1965 New South Wales state election: Earlwood
Party	Candidate	Votes	%	±%
Liberal	Eric Willis	13,902	59.9	+2.6
Labor	Harry Chandler	9,289	40.1	−2.6
Total formal votes		23,191	98.6	−0.4
Informal votes		330	1.4	+0.4
Turnout		23,521	95.2	−0.4
Liberal hold		Swing	+2.6	

=== East Hills ===
1965 New South Wales state election: East Hills
Party	Candidate	Votes	%	±%
Labor	Joe Kelly	14,036	53.3	−13.5
Liberal	John Colley	7,621	29.0	−4.2
Independent	Harold McIlveen	3,089	11.7	+11.7
Independent	Russell Duncan	989	3.8	+3.8
Independent	Jack Mingramm	320	1.2	+1.2
Independent	Norman Weeks	259	1.0	+1.0
Total formal votes		26,314	97.1	−1.2
Informal votes		785	2.9	+1.2
Turnout		27,099	96.2	+0.9
Two-party-preferred result
Labor	Joe Kelly	15,434	58.7	−8.1
Liberal	John Colley	10,880	41.3	+8.1
Labor hold		Swing	−8.1	

=== Eastwood ===
1965 New South Wales state election: Eastwood
Party	Candidate	Votes	%	±%
Liberal	Jim Clough	15,264	53.5	−13.7
Labor	George Keniry	7,323	25.7	−7.1
Independent	Marion Hearnshaw	4,569	16.0	+16.0
Democratic Labor	Doris Brauer	1,361	4.8	+4.8
Total formal votes		28,517	98.5	−0.5
Informal votes		441	1.5	+0.5
Turnout		28,958	93.6	−0.4
Two-party-preferred result
Liberal	Jim Clough	19,551	68.6	+1.4
Labor	George Keniry	8,966	31.4	−1.4
Liberal hold		Swing	+1.4	

=== Fairfield ===
1965 New South Wales state election: Fairfield
Party	Candidate	Votes	%	±%
Labor	Jack Ferguson	15,228	58.1	−5.0
Liberal	Stanislaus Kelly	9,710	37.0	+0.1
Democratic Labor	Andrew Murphy	1,281	4.9	+4.9
Total formal votes		26,219	97.0	−0.9
Informal votes		821	3.0	+0.9
Turnout		27,040	94.9	+0.5
Two-party-preferred result
Labor	Jack Ferguson	15,484	59.1	−4.0
Liberal	Stanislaus Kelly	10,735	40.9	+4.0
Labor hold		Swing	−4.0	

=== Georges River ===
1965 New South Wales state election: Georges River
Party	Candidate	Votes	%	±%
Liberal	Douglas Cross	16,497	58.3	+5.7
Labor	William Robinson	11,802	41.7	−4.3
Total formal votes		28,299	98.3	−0.5
Informal votes		476	1.7	+0.5
Turnout		28,775	95.4	−0.2
Liberal hold		Swing	+5.0	

=== Gloucester ===
1965 New South Wales state election: Gloucester
Party	Candidate	Votes	%	±%
Country	Leon Punch	14,337	73.2	+29.4
Independent	Bob Scott	5,249	26.8	+26.8
Total formal votes		19,586	98.5	−0.4
Informal votes		306	1.5	+0.4
Turnout		19,892	95.7	−0.1
Country hold		Swing	N/A	

=== Gordon ===
1965 New South Wales state election: Gordon
Party	Candidate	Votes	%	±%
Liberal	Harry Jago	22,870	88.2	+38.9
Democratic Labor	Dominique Droulers	3,066	11.8	+7.2
Total formal votes		25,936	95.6	−2.4
Informal votes		1,183	4.4	+2.4
Turnout		27,119	91.8	−1.9
Liberal hold		Swing	N/A	

=== Gosford ===
1965 New South Wales state election: Gosford
Party	Candidate	Votes	%	±%
Liberal	Ted Humphries	11,533	48.2	−2.5
Labor	Kevin Dwyer	10,543	44.1	−5.2
Democratic Labor	Michael Dwyer	1,839	7.7	+7.7
Total formal votes		23,915	98.5	−0.3
Informal votes		358	1.5	+0.3
Turnout		24,273	95.0	−0.1
Two-party-preferred result
Liberal	Ted Humphries	12,336	51.6	+0.9
Labor	Kevin Dwyer	11,579	48.4	−0.9
Liberal hold		Swing	+0.9	

=== Goulburn ===
1965 New South Wales state election: Goulburn
Party	Candidate	Votes	%	±%
Labor	Ernest McDermott	7,630	45.8	−5.6
Country	Ron Brewer	4,718	28.3	+28.3
Liberal	Brian Keating	4,313	25.9	−19.3
Total formal votes		16,661	98.7	−0.7
Informal votes		222	1.3	+0.7
Turnout		16,883	96.7	−0.1
Two-party-preferred result
Country	Ron Brewer	8,589	51.5	+51.5
Labor	Ernest McDermott	8,072	48.5	−3.6
Country gain from Labor		Swing	+3.6	

=== Granville ===
1965 New South Wales state election: Granville
Party	Candidate	Votes	%	±%
Labor	Pat Flaherty	13,565	58.9	+4.0
Liberal	Terence Quinn	7,793	33.8	+3.8
Democratic Labor	Andrew Diehm	1,692	7.3	+7.3
Total formal votes		23,050	97.3	−0.4
Informal votes		627	2.7	+0.4
Turnout		23,677	93.7	+0.2
Two-party-preferred result
Labor	Pat Flaherty	13,903	60.3	−6.7
Liberal	Terence Quinn	9,147	39.7	+6.7
Labor hold		Swing	−6.7	

=== Hamilton ===
1965 New South Wales state election: Hamilton
Party	Candidate	Votes	%	±%
Labor	Robert McCartney	12,262	64.3	+4.5
Liberal	Richard Nathan	6,805	35.7	+1.0
Total formal votes		19,067	98.4	−0.1
Informal votes		311	1.6	+0.1
Turnout		19,378	94.7	0.0
Labor hold		Swing	+3.4	

=== Hartley ===
1965 New South Wales state election: Hartley
Party	Candidate	Votes	%	±%
Labor	Jim Malone Robson	8,228	47.4	−1.5
Independent	Harold Coates	7,984	46.0	−1.5
Democratic Labor	Laurence Breen	1,151	6.6	+6.6
Total formal votes		17,363	98.7	0.0
Informal votes		224	1.3	0.0
Turnout		17,587	95.8	−0.2
Two-candidate-preferred result
Independent	Harold Coates	8,933	51.4	+2.1
Labor	Jim Robson	8,430	48.6	−2.1
Independent gain from Labor		Swing	+2.1	

=== Hawkesbury ===
1965 New South Wales state election: Hawkesbury
Party	Candidate	Votes	%	±%
Liberal	Bernie Deane	15,809	64.8	+3.8
Labor	Lawrence Kaufmann	8,048	33.0	−0.7
Independent	Malcolm Tarlton−Rayment	532	2.2	+2.2
Total formal votes		24,389	98.3	−0.2
Informal votes		427	1.7	+0.2
Turnout		24,816	92.2	−1.4
Two-party-preferred result
Liberal	Bernie Deane	16,075	65.9	+1.5
Labor	Lawrence Kaufmann	8,314	34.1	−1.5
Liberal hold		Swing	+1.5	

=== Hornsby ===
1965 New South Wales state election: Hornsby
Party	Candidate	Votes	%	±%
Liberal	John Maddison	21,191	69.6	+15.4
Labor	Terrence Foster	7,543	24.8	+0.1
Democratic Labor	Anthony Felton	1,723	5.7	+5.7
Total formal votes		30,457	98.4	−0.5
Informal votes		491	1.6	+0.5
Turnout		30,948	93.6	−0.6
Two-party-preferred result
Liberal	John Maddison	22,569	74.1	+4.1
Labor	Terrence Foster	7,888	25.9	−4.1
Liberal hold		Swing	+4.1	

=== Hurstville ===
1965 New South Wales state election: Hurstville
Party	Candidate	Votes	%	±%
Labor	Bill Rigby	11,883	48.7	−3.7
Liberal	Tom Mead	11,427	46.9	+4.2
Democratic Labor	Kevin Davis	1,068	4.4	+2.4
Total formal votes		24,378	98.2	−0.3
Informal votes		456	1.8	+0.3
Turnout		24,834	94.4	0.0
Two-party-preferred result
Liberal	Tom Mead	12,334	50.6	+5.9
Labor	Bill Rigby	12,044	49.4	−5.9
Liberal gain from Labor		Swing	+5.9	

=== Illawarra ===
1965 New South Wales state election: Illawarra
Party	Candidate	Votes	%	±%
Labor	Howard Fowles	12,523	52.7	−13.8
Liberal	John Poel	10,529	44.3	+18.4
Communist	Robert Webster	731	3.1	−4.4
Total formal votes		23,783	2.9	+0.6
Informal votes		711	2.9	−0.6
Turnout		24,494	95.1	+1.7
Two-party-preferred result
Labor	Howard Fowles	13,108	55.1	−17.5
Liberal	John Poel	10,675	44.9	+17.5
Labor hold		Swing	−17.5	

=== Kahibah ===
1965 New South Wales state election: Kahibah
Party	Candidate	Votes	%	±%
Labor	Jack Stewart	11,740	55.6	−6.1
Liberal	Wallace MacDonald	9,384	44.4	+44.4
Total formal votes		21,124	98.5	0.0
Informal votes		311	1.5	0.0
Turnout		21,435	95.5	+0.1
Labor hold		Swing	N/A	

=== King ===
1965 New South Wales state election: King
Party	Candidate	Votes	%	±%
Labor	Albert Sloss	11,277	58.6	−5.1
Liberal	John Partridge	6,445	33.5	+8.2
Communist	Ron Maxwell	1,532	8.0	+3.9
Total formal votes		19,254	96.3	−0.6
Informal votes		742	3.7	+0.6
Turnout		19,996	89.8	−0.1
Two-party-preferred result
Labor	Albert Sloss	12,503	64.9	−3.4
Liberal	John Partridge	6,751	35.1	+3.4
Labor hold		Swing	−3.4	

=== Kirribilli ===
1965 New South Wales state election: Kirribilli
Party	Candidate	Votes	%	±%
Liberal	John Waddy	10,318	51.6	+2.0
Labor	James Cahill	7,727	38.7	−6.4
Independent	Nicholas Gorshenin	1,934	9.7	+9.7
Total formal votes		19,979	97.8	−0.4
Informal votes		457	2.2	+0.4
Turnout		20,436	90.8	−0.6
Two-party-preferred result
Liberal	John Waddy	11,285	56.5	+3.4
Labor	James Cahill	8,694	43.5	−3.4
Liberal hold		Swing	+3.4	

=== Kogarah ===
1965 New South Wales state election: Kogarah
Party	Candidate	Votes	%	±%
Labor	Bill Crabtree	12,169	51.6	−4.4
Liberal	Albert Oakey	10,790	45.7	+1.7
Democratic Labor	Hubert O'Connell	635	2.7	+2.7
Total formal votes		23,594	98.5	−0.6
Informal votes		347	1.5	+0.6
Turnout		23,941	94.6	+0.1
Two-party-preferred result
Labor	Bill Crabtree	12,296	52.1	−3.9
Liberal	Albert Oakey	11,298	47.9	+3.9
Labor hold		Swing	−3.9	

=== Kurri Kurri ===
1965 New South Wales state election: Kurri Kurri
Party	Candidate	Votes	%	±%
Labor	Ken Booth	unopposed		
Labor hold				

=== Lake Macquarie ===
1968 New South Wales state election: Lake Macquarie
Party	Candidate	Votes	%	±%
Labor	Jim Simpson	16,495	72.3	−3.3
Liberal	John Wassell	6,306	27.7	+3.3
Total formal votes		22,801	98.2	−0.2
Informal votes		418	1.8	+0.2
Turnout		23,219	94.7	+0.3
Labor hold		Swing	−3.3	

=== Lakemba ===
1965 New South Wales state election: Lakemba
Party	Candidate	Votes	%	±%
Labor	Vince Durick	14,240	56.7	−3.8
Liberal	Arthur Parry	10,865	43.3	+6.5
Total formal votes		25,105	98.4	−0.3
Informal votes		401	1.6	+0.3
Turnout		25,506	95.1	+0.3
Labor hold		Swing	−5.9	

=== Lane Cove ===
1965 New South Wales state election: Lane Cove
Party	Candidate	Votes	%	±%
Liberal	Ken McCaw	19,246	80.8	−19.2
Democratic Labor	Edward Connolly	4,583	19.2	+19.2
Total formal votes		23,829	93.7	
Informal votes		1,606	6.3	
Turnout		25,435	92.6	
Liberal hold		Swing	N/A	

=== Lismore ===
1965 New South Wales state election: Lismore
Party	Candidate	Votes	%	±%
Labor	Keith Compton	7,624	45.8	−9.7
Country	Bruce Duncan	5,305	31.8	−10.6
Country	Digby Wilson	2,323	13.9	+13.9
Liberal	Alan Henderson	1,406	8.4	+8.4
Total formal votes		16,658	98.9	−0.3
Informal votes		182	1.1	+0.3
Turnout		16,840	94.6	−0.5
Two-party-preferred result
Country	Bruce Duncan	8,685	52.1	+8.0
Labor	Keith Compton	7,973	47.9	−8.0
Country gain from Labor		Swing	+8.0	

=== Liverpool ===
1965 New South Wales state election: Liverpool
Party	Candidate	Votes	%	±%
Labor	Jack Mannix	19,906	55.2	−6.1
Liberal	Warren Glenny	13,274	36.8	+3.1
Democratic Labor	Harry Cole	2,278	6.3	+1.3
Communist	Ronald Marriott	597	1.7	+1.7
Total formal votes		36,055	96.3	−1.3
Informal votes		1,375	3.7	+1.3
Turnout		37,430	92.5	−0.4
Two-party-preferred result
Labor	Jack Mannix	20,661	57.3	−5.0
Liberal	Warren Glenny	15,394	42.7	+5.0
Labor hold		Swing	−5.0	

=== Maitland ===
1965 New South Wales state election: Maitland
Party	Candidate	Votes	%	±%
Liberal	Milton Morris	13,158	64.2	+6.3
Labor	Wallace Fitzgerald	7,344	35.8	−6.3
Total formal votes		20,502	98.9	−0.2
Informal votes		227	1.1	+0.2
Turnout		20,729	96.4	+0.5
Liberal hold		Swing	+6.3	

=== Manly ===
1965 New South Wales state election: Manly
Party	Candidate	Votes	%	±%
Independent Liberal	Douglas Darby	13,728	53.9	+5.0
Liberal	Barton Higgs	9,175	36.0	−4.0
Independent	Albert Thompson	2,563	10.1	+10.1
Total formal votes		25,466	98.0	+0.7
Informal votes		531	2.0	−0.7
Turnout		25,997	92.2	−0.9
Two-candidate-preferred result
Independent Liberal	Douglas Darby	15,010	58.9	+3.0
Liberal	Barton Higgs	10,456	41.1	−3.0
Independent Liberal hold		Swing	+3.0	

=== Maroubra ===
1965 New South Wales state election: Maroubra
Party	Candidate	Votes	%	±%
Labor	Bob Heffron	12,369	56.2	−11.7
Liberal	Harold Heslehurst	7,932	36.1	+7.6
Independent	Thomas Bamborough	1,152	5.2	+5.2
Communist	Stanley Sharkey	540	2.5	+2.5
Total formal votes		21,993	97.8	−0.5
Informal votes		486	2.2	+0.5
Turnout		22,479	93.7	−0.9
Two-party-preferred result
Labor	Bob Heffron	13,416	61.0	−8.7
Liberal	Harold Heslehurst	8,577	39.0	+8.7
Labor hold		Swing	−8.7	

=== Marrickville ===
1965 New South Wales state election: Marrickville
Party	Candidate	Votes	%	±%
Labor	Norm Ryan	13,448	63.7	−4.2
Liberal	Neville Glass	7,654	36.3	+6.1
Total formal votes		21,102	97.3	−1.0
Informal votes		585	2.7	+1.0
Turnout		21,687	92.5	−0.2
Labor hold		Swing	−5.4	

=== Monaro ===
1965 New South Wales state election: Monaro
Party	Candidate	Votes	%	±%
Labor	John Seiffert Jr	7,906	46.6	−10.9
Liberal	Steve Mauger	5,862	34.5	−8.0
Country	Keith Phillis	3,204	18.9	+18.9
Total formal votes		16,972	97.9	−1.0
Informal votes		371	2.1	+1.0
Turnout		17,343	94.4	+1.2
Two-party-preferred result
Liberal	Steve Mauger	8,620	50.8	+8.3
Labor	John Seiffert Jr	8,352	49.2	−8.3
Liberal gain from Labor		Swing	+8.3	

The sitting member John Seiffert Sr (Labor) died in January 1965.

=== Mosman ===
1965 New South Wales state election: Mosman
Party	Candidate	Votes	%	±%
Liberal	Pat Morton	19,268	82.3	+1.5
Democratic Labor	Francis Hicks	4,143	17.7	−1.5
Total formal votes		23,411	93.9	−1.4
Informal votes		1,507	6.1	+1.4
Turnout		24,918	90.6	−1.0
Liberal hold		Swing	+1.5	

=== Mudgee ===
1965 New South Wales state election: Mudgee
Party	Candidate	Votes	%	±%
Labor	Leo Nott	8,115	50.6	−3.3
Liberal	Richard Evans	4,509	28.1	+2.4
Country	Emile Moufarrige	3,423	21.3	+3.0
Total formal votes		16,047	98.9	+0.4
Informal votes		184	1.1	−0.4
Turnout		16,231	96.0	+0.6
Two-party-preferred result
Labor	Leo Nott	8,355	52.1	−3.5
Liberal	Richard Evans	7,692	47.9	+3.5
Labor hold		Swing	−3.5	

=== Murray ===
1965 New South Wales state election: Murray
Party	Candidate	Votes	%	±%
Country	Joe Lawson	13,378	73.4	+7.3
Labor	George Xeros	4,839	26.6	−7.3
Total formal votes		18,217	99.1	−0.2
Informal votes		163	0.9	+0.2
Turnout		18,380	92.2	+1.3
Country hold		Swing	+7.3	

=== Murrumbidgee ===
1965 New South Wales state election: Murrumbidgee
Party	Candidate	Votes	%	±%
Labor	Al Grassby	9,670	49.2	−0.1
Country	Eric Baldwin	6,612	33.6	+13.7
Liberal	Michael Lowing	2,791	14.2	−10.8
Democratic Labor	John Troy	592	3.0	−2.8
Total formal votes		19,665	98.1	+0.2
Informal votes		390	1.9	−0.2
Turnout		20,055	94.9	+1.3
Two-party-preferred result
Labor	Al Grassby	10,161	51.7	−0.9
Country	Eric Baldwin	9,504	48.3	+0.9
Labor hold		Swing	−0.9	

=== Nepean ===
1965 New South Wales state election: Nepean
Party	Candidate	Votes	%	±%
Liberal	Ron Dunbier	13,144	45.9	−3.3
Labor	Alfred Bennett	13,078	45.7	−5.1
Independent	Kathleen Whitten	1,573	5.5	+5.5
Democratic Labor	Albert Perish	557	2.0	+2.0
Independent	John Park	191	0.7	+0.7
Independent	Ronald Sarina	76	0.3	+0.3
Total formal votes		28,619	96.5	−1.6
Informal votes		1,028	3.5	+1.6
Turnout		29,647	94.4	+0.3
Two-party-preferred result
Liberal	Ron Dunbier	14,550	50.8	+1.6
Labor	Alfred Bennett	14,069	49.2	−1.6
Liberal gain from Labor		Swing	+1.6	

=== Newcastle ===
1965 New South Wales state election: Newcastle
Party	Candidate	Votes	%	±%
Labor	Frank Hawkins	10,471	60.4	−1.9
Liberal	Stewart Mordue	6,065	35.0	+1.3
Communist	Mervyn Copley	798	4.6	+0.6
Total formal votes		17,334	98.6	−0.2
Informal votes		252	1.4	+0.2
Turnout		17,586	93.2	+0.1
Two-party-preferred result
Labor	Frank Hawkins	11,109	64.1	−1.4
Liberal	Stewart Mordue	6,225	35.9	+1.4
Labor hold		Swing	−1.4	

=== Orange ===
1965 New South Wales state election: Orange
Party	Candidate	Votes	%	±%
Country	Charles Cutler	12,040	64.8	+4.5
Labor	Kevin Whalan	6,549	35.2	−4.5
Total formal votes		18,589	99.0	0.0
Informal votes		182	1.0	0.0
Turnout		18,771	95.1	−0.6
Country hold		Swing	+4.5	

=== Oxley ===
1965 New South Wales state election: Oxley
Party	Candidate	Votes	%	±%
Liberal	Les Jordan	12,662	61.9	+20.6
Labor	Joseph Andrews	7,383	36.1	+0.7
Independent	Joe Cordner	397	1.9	+1.9
Total formal votes		20,442	99.0	0.0
Informal votes		198	1.0	0.0
Turnout		20,640	96.4	−0.3
Two-party-preferred result
Liberal	Les Jordan	12,900	63.1	+1.8
Labor	Joseph Andrews	7,542	36.9	−1.8
Liberal hold		Swing	+1.8	

=== Parramatta ===
1965 New South Wales state election: Parramatta
Party	Candidate	Votes	%	±%
Labor	Dan Mahoney	14,078	52.5	−5.3
Liberal	Paul Bland	11,754	43.8	+1.6
Democratic Labor	Hans Andreasson	981	3.7	+3.7
Total formal votes		26,813	98.5	−0.3
Informal votes		404	1.5	+0.3
Turnout		27,217	94.4	−0.3
Two-party-preferred result
Labor	Dan Mahoney	14,274	53.2	−4.6
Liberal	Paul Bland	12,539	46.8	+4.6
Labor hold		Swing	−4.6	

=== Phillip ===
1965 New South Wales state election: Phillip
Party	Candidate	Votes	%	±%
Labor	Pat Hills	12,392	58.7	−9.7
Liberal	Kenneth McKimm	6,794	32.2	+5.8
Communist	Walter Buckley	1,570	7.4	+2.1
Independent	John Walsh	360	1.7	+1.7
Total formal votes		21,116	96.1	−0.8
Informal votes		848	3.9	+0.8
Turnout		21,964	89.3	−0.1
Two-party-preferred result
Labor	Pat Hills	13,828	65.5	−7.1
Liberal	Kenneth McKimm	7,288	34.5	+7.1
Labor hold		Swing	−7.1	

=== Raleigh ===
1965 New South Wales state election: Raleigh
Party	Candidate	Votes	%	±%
Country	Jim Brown	10,972	64.2	+0.7
Labor	Robert Melville	6,114	35.8	−0.7
Total formal votes		17,086	99.2	−0.1
Informal votes		143	0.8	+0.1
Turnout		17,229	96.7	+0.6
Country hold		Swing	+0.7	

=== Randwick ===
1965 New South Wales state election: Randwick
Party	Candidate	Votes	%	±%
Labor	Lionel Bowen	11,953	55.4	+0.2
Liberal	Sidney Pitkethly	9,644	44.6	+5.2
Total formal votes		21,597	98.1	−0.5
Informal votes		422	1.9	+0.5
Turnout		22,019	92.0	−1.1
Labor hold		Swing	−1.0	

=== Redfern ===
1965 New South Wales state election: Redfern
Party	Candidate	Votes	%	±%
Labor	Fred Green	14,453	72.4	−9.4
Liberal	Gerald Bayliss	4,811	24.1	+10.7
Communist	Cecil Sharrock	703	3.5	−1.4
Total formal votes		19,967	96.6	−1.2
Informal votes		692	3.4	+1.2
Turnout		20,659	91.1	+0.1
Two-party-preferred result
Labor	Fred Green	15,015	75.2	−10.5
Liberal	Gerald Bayliss	4,952	24.8	+10.5
Labor hold		Swing	−10.5	

=== Rockdale ===
1965 New South Wales state election: Rockdale
Party	Candidate	Votes	%	±%
Labor	Brian Bannon	12,828	52.7	−2.1
Liberal	Angus Bristow	10,749	44.2	+3.0
Independent	Keith Richardson	763	3.1	+3.1
Total formal votes		24,340	98.2	−0.5
Informal votes		435	1.8	+0.5
Turnout		24,775	94.4	−0.3
Two-party-preferred result
Labor	Brian Bannon	13,210	54.3	−1.3
Liberal	Angus Bristow	11,130	45.7	+1.3
Labor hold		Swing	−1.3	

=== Ryde ===
1965 New South Wales state election: Ryde
Party	Candidate	Votes	%	±%
Labor	Frank Downing	14,386	52.1	−7.9
Liberal	Henry Mitchell	12,297	44.5	+4.5
Democratic Labor	Thomas Kennedy	948	3.4	+3.4
Total formal votes		27,631	98.3	−0.5
Informal votes		465	1.7	+0.5
Turnout		28,096	95.3	0.0
Two-party-preferred result
Labor	Frank Downing	14,576	52.8	−7.2
Liberal	Henry Mitchell	13,055	47.2	+7.2
Labor hold		Swing	−7.2	

=== South Coast ===
1965 New South Wales state election: South Coast
Party	Candidate	Votes	%	±%
Liberal	Jack Beale	15,465	68.1	+18.2
Independent	Noel Williams	7,240	31.9	+31.9
Total formal votes		22,705	98.2	−0.9
Informal votes		425	1.8	+0.9
Turnout		23,130	94.4	0.0
Liberal hold		Swing	N/A	

=== Sturt ===
1965 New South Wales state election: Sturt
Party	Candidate	Votes	%	±%
Labor	William Wattison	9,487	71.2	−3.8
Country	Edward Brown	3,831	28.8	+3.8
Total formal votes		13,318	98.5	−0.5
Informal votes		196	1.5	+0.5
Turnout		13,514	88.6	+0.7
Labor hold		Swing	−3.8	

=== Sutherland ===
1965 New South Wales state election: Sutherland
Party	Candidate	Votes	%	±%
Labor	Tom Dalton	15,096	50.0	+3.7
Liberal	Tim Walker	14,145	46.8	+10.3
Democratic Labor	William Goslett	975	3.2	+1.6
Total formal votes		30,216	98.6	−0.3
Informal votes		430	1.4	+0.3
Turnout		30,646	95.7	−0.4
Two-party-preferred result
Labor	Tom Dalton	15,334	50.8	−4.7
Liberal	Tim Walker	14,882	49.2	+4.7
Labor hold		Swing	−4.7	

=== Tamworth ===
1965 New South Wales state election: Tamworth
Party	Candidate	Votes	%	±%
Country	Bill Chaffey	11,708	58.9	−2.6
Labor	Stanley Cole	8,164	41.1	+2.6
Total formal votes		19,872	99.2	+0.1
Informal votes		164	0.8	−0.1
Turnout		20,036	95.6	+0.5
Country hold		Swing	−2.6	

=== Temora ===
1965 New South Wales state election: Temora
Party	Candidate	Votes	%	±%
Country	Jim Taylor	11,244	70.8	+6.9
Labor	John Herridge	4,638	29.2	−6.9
Total formal votes		15,882	99.2	−0.1
Informal votes		122	0.8	+0.1
Turnout		16,004	96.1	+0.8
Country hold		Swing	+6.9	

=== Tenterfield ===
1965 New South Wales state election: Tenterfield
Party	Candidate	Votes	%	±%
Country	Tim Bruxner	10,119	57.1	+6.4
Labor	Eric Potter	7,614	42.9	−6.4
Total formal votes		17,733	98.9	−0.3
Informal votes		203	1.1	+0.3
Turnout		17,936	94.9	+0.6
Country hold		Swing	+6.4	

=== The Hills ===
1965 New South Wales state election: The Hills
Party	Candidate	Votes	%	±%
Liberal	Max Ruddock	21,906	72.1	+15.8
Labor	Alan Francis	8,470	27.9	+27.9
Total formal votes		30,376	98.3	+1.0
Informal votes		521	1.7	−1.0
Turnout		30,897	93.3	+0.1
Liberal hold		Swing	N/A	

=== Upper Hunter ===
1965 New South Wales state election: Upper Hunter
Party	Candidate	Votes	%	±%
Country	Frank O'Keefe	10,797	63.7	+13.3
Labor	Leslie Uhrig	6,162	36.3	−13.3
Total formal votes		16,959	99.1	−0.3
Informal votes		145	0.9	+0.3
Turnout		17,104	95.6	−0.4
Country hold		Swing	+13.3	

=== Vaucluse ===
1965 New South Wales state election: Vaucluse
Party	Candidate	Votes	%	±%
Liberal	Keith Doyle	17,319	75.0	−4.0
Independent	Kevin McDermott	2,996	13.0	+13.0
Democratic Labor	Edward Byrnes	2,781	12.0	−9.0
Total formal votes		23,096	95.0	+1.7
Informal votes		1,221	5.0	−1.7
Turnout		24,317	90.6	+0.5
Two-candidate-preferred result
Liberal	Keith Doyle	18,709	81.0	+9.7
Independent	Kevin McDermott	4,387	19.0	−9.7
Liberal hold		Swing	N/A	

=== Wagga Wagga ===
1965 New South Wales state election: Wagga Wagga
Party	Candidate	Votes	%	±%
Liberal	Wal Fife	12,122	65.1	+7.9
Labor	John Skeers	5,374	28.9	−8.2
Democratic Labor	Anthony Abbey	1,128	6.1	+0.4
Total formal votes		18,624	98.6	−0.3
Informal votes		260	1.4	+0.3
Turnout		18,884	94.7	+0.4
Two-party-preferred result
Liberal	Wal Fife	13,024	69.9	+8.2
Labor	John Skeers	5,600	30.1	−8.2
Liberal hold		Swing	+8.2	

=== Wakehurst ===
1965 New South Wales state election: Wakehurst
Party	Candidate	Votes	%	±%
Liberal	Dick Healey	17,285	63.6	+11.9
Labor	Geoffrey Mill	8,912	32.8	−2.8
Independent	Frederick Jones	981	3.6	+3.6
Total formal votes		27,178	98.4	+0.5
Informal votes		434	1.6	−0.5
Turnout		27,612	92.7	−1.3
Two-party-preferred result
Liberal	Dick Healey	18,070	66.5	+7.6
Labor	Geoffrey Mill	9,108	33.5	−7.6
Liberal hold		Swing	+7.6	

=== Waratah ===
1965 New South Wales state election: Waratah
Party	Candidate	Votes	%	±%
Labor	Sam Jones	8,748	48.2	−4.5
Independent	Frank Purdue (defeated)	8,173	45.0	−2.3
Democratic Labor	Herbert Collins	824	4.5	+4.5
Independent	Brian Morgan	403	2.2	+2.2
Total formal votes		18,148	98.0	−0.8
Informal votes		363	2.0	+0.8
Turnout		18,511	95.7	+0.1
Two-candidate-preferred result
Labor	Sam Jones	9,217	50.8	−1.9
Independent	Frank Purdue	8,931	49.2	+1.9
Labor hold		Swing	−1.9	

Edward Greaves (Labor) died and Frank Purdue (Independent) won the resulting by-election. Sam Jones regained the seat for Labor.

=== Wentworthville ===
1965 New South Wales state election: Wentworthville
Party	Candidate	Votes	%	±%
Labor	Ernie Quinn	14,197	50.9	−0.3
Liberal	Ralph Stewart	12,300	44.1	+14.3
Democratic Labor	Arthur Byrnes	1,139	4.1	+4.1
Independent	Albert Hahn	260	0.9	+0.9
Total formal votes		27,896	97.4	−1.0
Informal votes		733	2.6	+1.0
Turnout		28,629	94.8	−0.2
Two-party-preferred result
Labor	Ernie Quinn	14,555	52.2	−8.5
Liberal	Ralph Stewart	13,341	47.8	+8.5
Labor hold		Swing	−8.5	

=== Willoughby ===
1965 New South Wales state election: Willoughby
Party	Candidate	Votes	%	±%
Liberal	George Brain	17,897	70.7	−29.3
Labor	Eddie Britt	7,399	29.3	+29.3
Total formal votes		25,296	98.1	
Informal votes		490	1.9	
Turnout		25,786	92.5	
Liberal hold		Swing	N/A	

=== Wollondilly ===
1965 New South Wales state election: Wollondilly
Party	Candidate	Votes	%	±%
Liberal	Tom Lewis	14,933	58.8	+1.9
Labor	Patrick O'Halloran	9,050	35.7	−7.4
Independent	James Downing	1,405	5.5	+5.5
Total formal votes		25,388	98.7	−0.3
Informal votes		341	1.3	+0.3
Turnout		25,729	95.1	+0.2
Two-party-preferred result
Liberal	Tom Lewis	15,636	61.6	+4.7
Labor	Patrick O'Halloran	9,752	38.4	−4.7
Liberal hold		Swing	+4.7	

=== Wollongong−Kembla ===
1965 New South Wales state election: Wollongong−Kembla
Party	Candidate	Votes	%	±%
Labor	Doug Porter	9,805	46.7	−11.8
Liberal	Jack Hough	9,539	45.4	+3.9
Independent	Andrew Gibson	903	4.3	+4.3
Independent	Peter Barnes	760	3.6	+3.6
Total formal votes		21,007	97.2	−1.2
Informal votes		613	2.8	+1.2
Turnout		21,620	94.8	−1.2
Two-party-preferred result
Liberal	Jack Hough	10,697	50.9	+9.4
Labor	Doug Porter	10,310	49.1	−9.4
Liberal gain from Labor		Swing	+9.4	

=== Wyong ===
1965 New South Wales state election: Wyong
Party	Candidate	Votes	%	±%
Labor	Harry Jensen	12,273	55.6	+2.3
Liberal	Kenneth Charters	8,928	40.4	+0.6
Democratic Labor	Hugh Ansell	888	4.0	+0.3
Total formal votes		22,089	98.7	+0.2
Informal votes		298	1.3	−0.2
Turnout		22,387	94.9	+0.4
Two-party-preferred result
Labor	Harry Jensen	12,451	56.4	+0.8
Liberal	Kenneth Charters	9,638	43.6	−0.8
Labor hold		Swing	+0.8	

=== Young ===
1965 New South Wales state election: Young
Party	Candidate	Votes	%	±%
Country	George Freudenstein	11,987	62.5	+8.9
Labor	Robert Rygate	7,192	37.5	−4.3
Total formal votes		19,179	99.1	−0.1
Informal votes		167	0.9	+0.1
Turnout		19,346	95.8	−0.1
Country hold		Swing	+5.2	

== See also ==
- Candidates of the 1965 New South Wales state election
- Members of the New South Wales Legislative Assembly, 1965–1968
