= Electoral results for the district of Nepean (New South Wales) =

Election results for Nepean, New South Wales, Australia

Nepean, an electoral district of the Legislative Assembly in the Australian state of New South Wales, had two incarnations, from 1859 to 1904 and from 1927 to 1981.

Election	Member	Party
1859	Robert Jamison	None
1860	James Ryan	None
1864	James Ryan	None
1869	James Ryan	None
1872	Joseph Single	None
1874	Patrick Shepherd	None
1877	Thomas Smith	None
1880	Thomas Smith	None
1882	Thomas Smith	None
1885	Thomas Smith	None
1887	Samuel Lees	Free Trade
1889	Samuel Lees	Free Trade
1891	Samuel Lees	Free Trade
1894	Samuel Lees	Free Trade
1895	Thomas Smith	Protectionist
1898	Samuel Lees	Free Trade
1901	Thomas Smith	Progressive
Election	Member	Party
1927	Joseph Jackson	Nationalist
1930	Joseph Jackson	Nationalist
1932	Joseph Jackson	United Australia
1935	Joseph Jackson	United Australia
1938	Joseph Jackson	United Australia
1941	Joseph Jackson	United Australia
1944	Joseph Jackson	Independent Democrat
1947	Joseph Jackson	Liberal
1950	Joseph Jackson	Liberal
1953	Joseph Jackson	Liberal
1956	Bill Chapman	Liberal
1959	Bill Chapman	Liberal
1962	Alfred Bennett	Labor
1965	Ron Dunbier	Liberal
1968	Ron Dunbier	Liberal
1971	Ron Mulock	Labor
1973	Ron Rofe	Liberal
1976	Ron Rofe	Liberal
1978	Peter Anderson	Labor

== Election results ==
=== Elections in the 1970s ===
==== 1978 ====
1978 New South Wales state election: Nepean
Party	Candidate	Votes	%	±%
Labor	Peter Anderson	20,720	56.1	+5.0
Liberal	Ron Rofe	14,466	39.2	−5.7
Democrats	Ronald Edwards	1,752	4.7	+4.7
Total formal votes		36,938	98.4	−0.3
Informal votes		602	1.6	+0.3
Turnout		37,540	93.6	+0.1
Two-party-preferred result
Labor	Peter Anderson	21,596	58.5	+10.8
Liberal	Ron Rofe	15,342	41.5	−10.8
Labor gain from Liberal		Swing	+10.8	

==== 1976 ====
1976 New South Wales state election: Nepean
Party	Candidate	Votes	%	±%
Liberal	Ron Rofe	17,038	51.1	+3.8
Labor	Peter Anderson	14,965	44.9	+6.2
Independent	John Henshaw	914	2.7	+2.7
Independent	Raymond Bell	418	1.3	+1.3
Total formal votes		33,335	98.7	+2.3
Informal votes		426	1.3	−2.3
Turnout		33,761	93.5	+0.9
Two-party-preferred result
Liberal	Ron Rofe	17,440	52.3	−1.0
Labor	Peter Anderson	15,895	47.7	+1.0
Liberal hold		Swing	−1.0	

==== 1973 ====
1973 New South Wales state election: Nepean
Party	Candidate	Votes	%	±%
Liberal	Ron Rofe	12,526	47.3	
Labor	Kathleen Tucker	10,240	38.7	
Independent	John Allan	1,470	5.6	
Independent	Gregory Woodward	1,435	5.4	
Democratic Labor	David Sanson	677	2.6	
Independent	Maurice Sharp	120	0.5	
Total formal votes		26,468	96.4	
Informal votes		976	3.6	
Turnout		27,444	92.6	
Two-party-preferred result
Liberal	Ron Rofe	14,097	53.3	+1.4
Labor	Kathleen Tucker	12,371	46.7	−1.4
Liberal notional hold		Swing	+1.4	

The sitting member was Ron Mulock (Labor) however the 1973 redistribution made Gosford a notional Liberal seat and Mulock successfully contested the new seat of Penrith.

==== 1971 ====
1971 New South Wales state election: Nepean
Party	Candidate	Votes	%	±%
Labor	Ron Mulock	13,068	48.9	+4.1
Liberal	Ron Dunbier	10,416	38.9	−16.3
Independent	John Andersen	1,854	6.9	+6.9
Democratic Labor	Leslie Clarke	1,409	5.3	+5.3
Total formal votes		26,747	97.6	
Informal votes		664	2.4	
Turnout		27,411	93.7	
Two-party-preferred result
Labor	Ron Mulock	13,793	51.6	+6.8
Liberal	Ron Dunbier	12,954	48.4	−6.8
Labor gain from Liberal		Swing	+6.8	

=== Elections in the 1960s ===
==== 1968 ====
1968 New South Wales state election: Nepean
Party	Candidate	Votes	%	±%
Liberal	Ron Dunbier	10,915	52.3	+2.4
Labor	Alfred Bennett	9,955	47.7	+6.0
Total formal votes		20,870	97.5	
Informal votes		544	2.5	
Turnout		21,414	94.8	
Liberal hold		Swing	−3.0	

==== 1965 ====
1965 New South Wales state election: Nepean
Party	Candidate	Votes	%	±%
Liberal	Ron Dunbier	13,144	45.9	−3.3
Labor	Alfred Bennett	13,078	45.7	−5.1
Independent	Kathleen Whitten	1,573	5.5	+5.5
Democratic Labor	Albert Perish	557	2.0	+2.0
Independent	John Park	191	0.7	+0.7
Independent	Ronald Sarina	76	0.3	+0.3
Total formal votes		28,619	96.5	−1.6
Informal votes		1,028	3.5	+1.6
Turnout		29,647	94.4	+0.3
Two-party-preferred result
Liberal	Ron Dunbier	14,550	50.8	+1.6
Labor	Alfred Bennett	14,069	49.2	−1.6
Liberal gain from Labor		Swing	+1.6	

==== 1962 ====
1962 New South Wales state election:
Party	Candidate	Votes	%	±%
Labor	Alfred Bennett	12,267	50.8	+10.1
Liberal	Bill Chapman	11,892	49.2	−6.1
Total formal votes		24,159	98.1	
Informal votes		467	1.9	
Turnout		24,626	94.1	
Labor gain from Liberal		Swing	+7.0	

=== Elections in the 1950s ===
==== 1959 ====
1959 New South Wales state election: Nepean
Party	Candidate	Votes	%	±%
Liberal	Bill Chapman	12,284	60.3	
Labor	John Carvan	7,279	35.7	
Communist	Melville McCalman	817	4.0	
Total formal votes		20,380	98.4	
Informal votes		327	1.6	
Turnout		20,707	94.0	
Two-party-preferred result
Liberal	Bill Chapman	12,447	61.1	
Labor	John Carvan	7,933	38.9	
Liberal hold		Swing		

==== 1956 ====
1956 New South Wales state election: Nepean
Party	Candidate	Votes	%	±%
Liberal	Bill Chapman	10,335	54.0	+1.5
Labor	Alfred Bennett	6,946	36.3	−11.2
Independent Labor	Jim Chalmers	1,216	6.4	+6.4
Communist	Mel McCalman	635	3.3	+3.3
Total formal votes		19,132	98.1	0.0
Informal votes		379	1.9	0.0
Turnout		19,511	93.9	+0.9
Two-party-preferred result
Liberal	Bill Chapman	10,641	55.6	+3.0
Labor	Alfred Bennett	8,491	44.4	−3.0
Liberal hold		Swing	+3.0	

==== 1953 ====
1953 New South Wales state election: Nepean
Party	Candidate	Votes	%	±%
Liberal	Joseph Jackson	9,097	52.5	
Labor	Alexander Liston	8,213	47.5	
Total formal votes		17,310	98.1	
Informal votes		335	1.9	
Turnout		17,645	93.0	
Liberal hold		Swing		

==== 1950 ====
1950 New South Wales state election: Nepean
Party	Candidate	Votes	%	±%
Liberal	Joseph Jackson	7,342	52.9	
Independent	Allan Taylor	6,523	47.1	
Total formal votes		13,865	96.8	
Informal votes		459	3.2	
Turnout		14,324	91.9	
Liberal hold		Swing		

=== Elections in the 1940s ===
==== 1947 ====
1947 New South Wales state election: Nepean
Party	Candidate	Votes	%	±%
Liberal	Joseph Jackson	9,989	56.6	+20.2
Labor	Earle Cameron	7,644	43.4	+2.0
Total formal votes		17,633	98.2	+0.7
Informal votes		324	1.8	−0.7
Turnout		17,957	94.0	+4.5
Member changed to Liberal from Independent Democrat		Swing	+1.6	

==== 1944 ====
1944 New South Wales state election: Nepean
Party	Candidate	Votes	%	±%
Labor	John Jackson	6,394	41.4	−2.2
Independent Democrat	Joseph Jackson	5,622	36.4	+36.4
Democratic	Allan Taylor	3,427	22.2	−33.2
Total formal votes		15,443	97.5	−0.6
Informal votes		399	2.5	+0.6
Turnout		15,842	89.5	−3.0
Two-candidate-preferred result
Independent Democrat	Joseph Jackson	8,494	55.0	+55.0
Labor	John Jackson	6,949	45.0	+1.4
Member changed to Independent Democrat from United Australia		Swing	N/A	

- Joseph Jackson was the sitting MP for Nepean, who won the previous election as a United Australia candidate.

==== 1941 ====
1941 New South Wales state election: Nepean
Party	Candidate	Votes	%	±%
United Australia	Joseph Jackson	7,720	56.4	
Labor	William Mathews	5,955	43.6	
Total formal votes		13,675	98.1	
Informal votes		263	1.9	
Turnout		13,938	92.5	
United Australia hold		Swing		

=== Elections in the 1930s ===
==== 1938 ====
1938 New South Wales state election: Nepean
Party	Candidate	Votes	%	±%
United Australia	Joseph Jackson	6,993	44.1	−21.5
Labor	John Jackson	4,899	30.9	−3.5
United Australia	Arthur Hebblewhite	3,965	25.0	+25.0
Total formal votes		15,857	97.7	−0.1
Informal votes		379	2.3	+0.1
Turnout		16,236	95.0	+0.1
Two-party-preferred result
United Australia	Joseph Jackson	9,743	61.4	−4.2
Labor	John Jackson	6,114	38.6	+4.2
United Australia hold		Swing	−4.2	

==== 1935 ====
1935 New South Wales state election: Nepean
Party	Candidate	Votes	%	±%
United Australia	Joseph Jackson	10,085	65.6	−20.3
Labor (NSW)	John Jackson	5,292	34.4	+34.4
Total formal votes		15,377	97.8	+6.5
Informal votes		340	2.2	−6.5
Turnout		15,717	94.9	−0.4
United Australia hold		Swing	N/A	

==== 1932 ====
1932 New South Wales state election: Nepean
Party	Candidate	Votes	%	±%
United Australia	Joseph Jackson	10,779	85.9	+28.2
Communist	Thomas Moon	1,764	14.1	+14.1
Total formal votes		12,543	91.3	−7.6
Informal votes		1,188	8.7	+7.6
Turnout		13,731	95.3	−0.2
United Australia hold		Swing	N/A	

==== 1930 ====
1930 New South Wales state election: Nepean
Party	Candidate	Votes	%	±%
Nationalist	Joseph Jackson	7,510	57.7	
Labor	John Freeman	5,501	42.3	
Total formal votes		13,011	98.9	
Informal votes		148	1.1	
Turnout		13,159	95.5	
Nationalist hold		Swing		

=== Elections in the 1920s ===
==== 1927 ====
1927 New South Wales state election: Nepean
Party	Candidate	Votes	%	±%
Nationalist	Joseph Jackson	8,055	65.7	
Labor	William Long	3,996	32.6	
Independent	Thomas Gollan	131	1.1	
Independent	William Miller	76	0.6	
Total formal votes		12,258	98.9	
Informal votes		139	1.1	
Turnout		12,397	80.0	
Nationalist win		(new seat)		

District recreated

==== 1904 - 1927 ====
District abolished

=== Elections in the 1900s ===
==== 1901 ====
1901 New South Wales state election: The Nepean
Party	Candidate	Votes	%	±%
Progressive	Thomas Smith	930	53.8	+11.5
Liberal Reform	Samuel Lees	799	46.2	−1.8
Total formal votes		1,729	100.0	+1.2
Informal votes		0	0.0	−1.2
Turnout		1,729	72.5	+3.7
Progressive gain from Liberal Reform				

=== Elections in the 1890s ===
==== 1898 ====
1898 New South Wales colonial election: The Nepean
Party	Candidate	Votes	%	±%
Free Trade	Samuel Lees	744	48.0	
National Federal	Thomas Smith	656	42.3	
Ind. Free Trade	Alfred Reid	151	9.7	
Total formal votes		1,551	98.9	
Informal votes		18	1.2	
Turnout		1,569	68.8	
Free Trade gain from National Federal				

==== 1895 ====
1895 New South Wales colonial election: The Nepean
Party	Candidate	Votes	%	±%
Protectionist	Thomas Smith	806	51.4	
Free Trade	Samuel Lees	763	48.6	
Total formal votes		1,569	99.4	
Informal votes		9	0.6	
Turnout		1,578	76.6	
Protectionist gain from Free Trade				

==== 1894 ====
1894 New South Wales colonial election: The Nepean
Party	Candidate	Votes	%	±%
Free Trade	Samuel Lees	884	49.4	
Protectionist	Thomas Smith	785	43.9	
Labour	Lewis Litton	121	6.8	
Total formal votes		1,790	99.3	
Informal votes		13	0.7	
Turnout		1,803	87.2	
Free Trade hold				

==== 1891 ====
1891 New South Wales colonial election: The Nepean Wednesday 17 June
Party	Candidate	Votes	%	±%
Free Trade	Samuel Lees (re-elected)	1,079	55.8	
Protectionist	Thomas Smith	856	44.2	
Total formal votes		1,935	99.4	
Informal votes		11	0.6	
Turnout		1,946	72.2	
Free Trade hold				

=== Elections in the 1880s ===
==== 1889 ====
1889 New South Wales colonial election: The Nepean Saturday 9 February
Party	Candidate	Votes	%	±%
Free Trade	Samuel Lees (elected)	1,068	61.8	
Protectionist	Thomas Smith	661	38.2	
Total formal votes		1,729	98.9	
Informal votes		19	1.1	
Turnout		1,748	69.5	
Free Trade hold				

==== 1887 ====
1887 New South Wales colonial election: The Nepean Monday 7 February
Party	Candidate	Votes	%	±%
Free Trade	Samuel Lees (elected)	701	50.7	
Ind. Free Trade	Thomas Smith (defeated)	683	49.4	
Total formal votes		1,384	98.5	
Informal votes		21	1.5	
Turnout		1,405	75.5	

==== 1885 ====
1885 New South Wales colonial election: The Nepean Friday 16 October
Candidate	Votes	%
Thomas Smith (re-elected)	838	79.6
Thomas Cross	215	20.4
Total formal votes	1,053	98.0
Informal votes	21	2.0
Turnout	1,074	62.6

==== 1882 ====
1882 New South Wales colonial election: The Nepean Tuesday 5 December
Candidate	Votes	%
Thomas Smith (re-elected)	804	78.4
Joseph Single	221	21.6
Total formal votes	1,025	98.6
Informal votes	15	1.4
Turnout	1,040	70.6

==== 1880 ====
1880 New South Wales colonial election: The Nepean Monday 22 November
Candidate	Votes	%
Thomas Smith (re-elected)	unopposed	

=== Elections in the 1870s ===
==== 1877 ====
1877 New South Wales colonial election: The Nepean Monday 29 October
Candidate	Votes	%
Thomas Smith (elected)	520	60.9
John Smith (defeated)	334	39.1
Total formal votes	854	100.0
Informal votes	0	0.0
Turnout	854	74.0

The sitting member was Patrick Shepherd who did not contest the election. John Smith was the sitting member for Wellington.

==== 1874 ====
1874–75 New South Wales colonial election: The Nepean Wednesday 23 December 1874
Candidate	Votes	%
Patrick Shepherd (elected)	372	55.9
James Ryan	294	44.1
Total formal votes	666	95.7
Informal votes	30	4.3
Turnout	686	63.1

==== 1872 ====
1872 New South Wales colonial election: The Nepean Wednesday 28 February
Candidate	Votes	%
Joseph Single (elected)	286	33.3
Henry Woods	236	27.5
James Rodd	172	20.1
James Ryan (defeated)	164	19.1
Total formal votes	858	100.0
Informal votes	0	0.0
Turnout	856	63.8

=== Elections in the 1860s ===
==== 1869 ====
1869–70 New South Wales colonial election: The Nepean Tuesday 14 December 1869
Candidate	Votes	%
James Ryan (re-elected)	405	59.2
Archibald Thompson	271	39.6
Thomas Shepherd	8	1.2
Total formal votes	684	100.0
Informal votes	0	0.0
Turnout	684	52.5

==== 1864 ====
1864–65 New South Wales colonial election: The Nepean Saturday 10 December 1864
Candidate	Votes	%
James Ryan (re-elected)	408	54.0
Thomas Shepherd	345	45.6
William Cover	2	0.3
George Sanders	1	0.1
Total formal votes	756	100.0
Informal votes	0	0.0
Turnout	754	62.7

==== 1860 ====
1860 New South Wales colonial election: The Nepean Friday 14 December
Candidate	Votes	%
James Ryan (elected)	313	52.6
Robert Jamison (defeated)	236	39.7
John Smith	46	7.7
Total formal votes	595	100.0
Informal votes	0	0.0
Turnout	595	42.9

=== Elections in the 1850s ===
==== 1859 ====
1859 New South Wales colonial election: The Nepean Thursday 16 June
Candidate	Votes	%
Robert Jamison (re-elected)	unopposed	
