= Candidates of the 1965 New South Wales state election =

This is a list of candidates of the 1965 New South Wales state election. The election was held on 1 May 1965.

== Retiring Members ==
Note: Liberal MLAs Geoffrey Cox (Vaucluse) and Les Ford (Dubbo) died in late 1964 while Labor MLA John Seiffert Sr (Monaro) died in January 1965. No by-elections were held.

=== Labor ===
- George Enticknap MLA (Murrumbidgee)
- Ray Maher MLA (Wyong)
- Jim Robson MLA (Hartley)
- Thomas Ryan MLA (Auburn)
- Laurie Tully MLA (Goulburn)
- Ernest Wetherell MLA (Cobar)

=== Liberal ===
- Eric Hearnshaw MLA (Eastwood)
- Harold Jackson MLA (Gosford)
- Doug Padman MLA (Albury)

== Legislative Assembly ==
Sitting members are shown in bold text. Successful candidates are highlighted in the relevant colour. Where there is possible confusion, an asterisk (*) is also used.

Electorate	Held by	Labor candidate	Coalition candidate	Other candidates
Albury	Liberal	Robert White	James Griffiths (CP); Gordon Mackie* (Lib)	Leo Keane (DLP)
Armidale	Country	Patrick McGee	**Davis Hughes** (CP)	
Ashfield-Croydon	Liberal	Wadim Jegorow	**David Hunter** (Lib)	Raymond Sharrock (Ind)
Auburn	Labor	Peter Cox	Neil Davis (Lib)	
Balmain	Labor	**John McMahon**	Elton Lewis (Lib)	Harry Black (CPA)
Bankstown	Labor	**Nick Kearns**	David Cowan (Lib)	Frank Bollins (CPA)
Barwon	Country	Cecil Newton	**Geoff Crawford** (CP)	
Bass Hill	Labor	**Clarrie Earl**	William Pardy (Lib)	John Sawyer (Ind)
Bathurst	Labor	**Gus Kelly**	Clive Osborne (CP); French Smith (Lib)	
Blacktown	Labor	**Jim Southee**	Denys Clarke (Lib)	Malcolm Towner (Ind)
Bligh	Labor	**Tom Morey**	Morton Cohen (Lib)	John Kenny (DLP)
Bondi	Labor	**Abe Landa**	John Barraclough (Lib)	
Bulli	Labor	**Rex Jackson**	Donald Heggie (Lib)	Sara Bowen (CPA); Mary Hargrave (Ind)
Burrinjuck	Labor	**Bill Sheahan**	Stanley Ablamowicz (Lib); Douglas Boag (CP)	
Burwood	Liberal	Norman Newey	John Jackett (Lib)	**Ben Doig** (Ind Lib)
Byron	Country	James Constable	**Stanley Stephens** (CP)	
Canterbury	Labor	**Kevin Stewart**	Colin McPhee (Lib)	
Casino	Country		**Richmond Manyweathers** (CP)	
Castlereagh	Labor	**Jack Renshaw**	Doug Moppett (CP); William Waterford (Lib)	Angus Campbell (Ind)
Cessnock	Labor	**George Neilly**		Charles Dumbrell (CPA); Hilton Smith (DLP)
Clarence	Country	Philip Parsonage	**Bill Weiley** (CP)	
Cobar	Labor	Lew Johnstone	Allan Connell (Lib)	William Edwards (Ind); Douglas McFarlane (Ind)
Collaroy	Liberal	William Bramwell	**Robert Askin** (Lib)	Elfrida Morcom (CPA)
Concord	Labor	**Thomas Murphy**	Lerryn Mutton (Lib)	William Doherty (DLP)
Coogee	Labor	**Lou Walsh**	Kevin Ellis (Lib)	Philip Cohen (DLP)
Cook's River	Labor	**Tom Cahill**	Louis Mamo (Lib)	
Cronulla	Liberal	Wallace Page	**Ian Griffith** (Lib)	Alexander Elphinston (CPA)
Drummoyne	Labor	**Reg Coady**	George Chambers (Lib)	Edwin Carr (DLP)
Dubbo	Liberal	Kenneth Mason	Roderick Mack (CP); John Mason* (Lib)	
Dulwich Hill	Labor	**Cliff Mallam**	Russell Carter (Lib)	
Earlwood	Liberal	Harry Chandler	**Eric Willis** (Lib)	
East Hills	Labor	**Joe Kelly**	John Colley (Lib)	Russell Duncan (Ind); Harold McIlveen (Ind); Jack Mingramm (Ind); Norman Weeks (Ind)
Eastwood	Liberal	George Keniry	Jim Clough (Lib)	Doris Brauer (DLP); Marion Hearnshaw (Ind)
Fairfield	Labor	**Jack Ferguson**	Stanislaus Kelly (Lib)	Andrew Murphy (DLP)
Georges River	Liberal	William Robinson	**Douglas Cross** (Lib)	
Gloucester	Country		**Leon Punch** (CP)	Bob Scott (Ind)
Gordon	Liberal		**Harry Jago** (Lib)	Dominique Droulers (DLP)
Gosford	Liberal	Kevin Dwyer	Ted Humphries (Lib)	Michael Dwyer (DLP)
Goulburn	Labor	Ernest McDermott	Ron Brewer* (CP); Brian Keating (Lib)	
Granville	Labor	**Pat Flaherty**	Terence Quinn (Lib)	Andrew Diehm (DLP)
Hamilton	Labor	**Robert McCartney**	Richard Nathan (Lib)	
Hartley	Labor	James Robson		Laurence Breen (DLP); Harold Coates* (Ind)
Hawkesbury	Liberal	Lawrence Kaufmann	**Bernie Deane** (Lib)	Malcolm Tarlton-Rayment (Ind)
Hornsby	Liberal	Terrence Foster	**John Maddison** (Lib)	Anthony Felton (DLP)
Hurstville	Labor	**Bill Rigby**	Tom Mead (Lib)	Kevin Davis (DLP)
Illawarra	Labor	**Howard Fowles**	John Poel (Lib)	Robert Webster (CPA)
Kahibah	Labor	**Jack Stewart**	Wallace MacDonald (Lib)	
King	Labor	**Albert Sloss**	John Partridge (Lib)	Ron Maxwell (CPA)
Kirribilli	Liberal	James Cahill	**John Waddy** (Lib)	Nicholas Gorshenin (Ind)
Kogarah	Labor	**Bill Crabtree**	Albert Oakey (Lib)	Hubert O'Connell (DLP)
Kurri Kurri	Labor	**Ken Booth**		
Lake Macquarie	Labor	**Jim Simpson**	John Wassell (Lib)	
Lakemba	Labor	**Vince Durick**	Arthur Parry (Lib)	
Lane Cove	Liberal		**Ken McCaw** (Lib)	Edward Connolly (DLP)
Lismore	Labor	**Keith Compton**	Bruce Duncan* (CP); Alan Henderson (Lib); Digby Wilson (CP)	
Liverpool	Labor	**Jack Mannix**	Warren Glenny (Lib)	Harry Cole (DLP); Ronald Marriott (CPA)
Maitland	Liberal	Wallace Fitzgerald	**Milton Morris** (Lib)	
Manly	Independent		Barton Higgs (Lib)	**Douglas Darby*** (Ind Lib); Albert Thompson (Ind)
Maroubra	Labor	**Bob Heffron**	Harold Heslehurst (Lib)	Thomas Bamborough (Ind); Stanley Sharkey (CPA)
Marrickville	Labor	**Norm Ryan**	Neville Glass (Lib)	
Monaro	Labor	John Seiffert Jr	Steve Mauger* (Lib); Keith Phillis (CP)	
Mosman	Liberal		**Pat Morton** (Lib)	Francis Hicks (DLP)
Mudgee	Labor	**Leo Nott**	Dick Evans (Lib); Emile Moufarrige (CP)	
Murray	Country	George Xeros	**Joe Lawson** (CP)	
Murrumbidgee	Labor	Al Grassby	Eric Baldwin (CP); Michael Lowing (Lib)	John Troy (DLP)
Nepean	Labor	**Alfred Bennett**	Ron Dunbier (Lib)	John Park (Ind); Albert Perish (DLP); Ronald Sarina (Ind); Kathleen Whitten (Ind)
Newcastle	Labor	**Frank Hawkins**	Stewart Mordue (Lib)	Mervyn Copley (CPA)
Orange	Country	Kevin Whalan	**Charles Cutler** (CP)	
Oxley	Liberal	Joseph Andrews	**Les Jordan** (Lib)	Joe Cordner (Ind)
Parramatta	Labor	**Dan Mahoney**	Paul Bland (Lib)	Hans Andreasson (DLP)
Phillip	Labor	**Pat Hills**	Kenneth McKimm (Lib)	Walter Buckley (CPA); John Walsh (Ind)
Raleigh	Country	Robert Melville	**Jim Brown** (CP)	
Randwick	Labor	**Lionel Bowen**	Sidney Pitkethly (Lib)	
Redfern	Labor	**Fred Green**	Gerald Bayliss (Lib)	Cecil Sharrock (CPA)
Rockdale	Labor	**Brian Bannon**	Angus Bristow (Lib)	Keith Richardson (Ind)
Ryde	Labor	**Frank Downing**	Henry Mitchell (Lib)	Thomas Kennedy (DLP)
South Coast	Liberal		**Jack Beale** (Lib)	Noel Williams (Ind)
Sturt	Labor	**William Wattison**	Edward Brown (CP)	
Sutherland	Labor	**Tom Dalton**	Tim Walker (Lib)	William Goslett (DLP)
Tamworth	Country	Stanley Cole	**Bill Chaffey** (CP)	
Temora	Country	John Herridge	**Jim Taylor** (CP)	
Tenterfield	Country	Eric Potter	**Tim Bruxner** (CP)	
The Hills	Liberal	Alan Francis	**Max Ruddock** (Lib)	
Upper Hunter	Country	Leslie Uhrig	**Frank O'Keefe** (CP)	
Vaucluse	Liberal		Keith Doyle (Lib)	Edward Byrnes (DLP); Kevin McDermott (Ind)
Wagga Wagga	Liberal	John Skeers	**Wal Fife** (Lib)	Anthony Abbey (DLP)
Wakehurst	Liberal	Geoffrey Mill	**Dick Healey** (Lib)	Frederick Jones (Ind)
Waratah	Independent	Sam Jones		Jack Collins (DLP); Brian Morgan (Ind); **Frank Purdue** (Ind)
Wentworthville	Labor	**Ernie Quinn**	Ralph Stewart (Lib)	Arthur Byrnes (DLP); Albert Hahn (Ind)
Willoughby	Liberal	Eddie Britt	**George Brain** (Lib)	
Wollondilly	Liberal	Patrick O'Halloran	**Tom Lewis** (Lib)	
Wollongong-Kembla	Labor	**Doug Porter**	Jack Hough (Lib)	Peter Barnes (Ind); Andrew Gibson (Ind)
Wyong	Labor	Harry Jensen	Kenneth Charters	Hugh Ansell (DLP)
Young	Country	Robert Rygate	**George Freudenstein** (CP)	

== See also ==
- Members of the New South Wales Legislative Assembly, 1965–1968
