= Electoral results for the district of Waratah (New South Wales) =

Election results for Waratah, New South Wales, Australia

Waratah, an electoral district of the Legislative Assembly in the Australian state of New South Wales, had two incarnations, the first from 1894 to 1913, the second from 1930 to 1999.

Election	Member	Party
1894	Arthur Griffith	Labour
1895	Arthur Griffith	Labour
1898	Arthur Griffith	Labour
1901	Arthur Griffith	Labour
1903 by	Matthew Charlton	Labour
1904	John Estell	Labour
1907	John Estell	Labour
1910	John Estell	Labour
Election	Member	Party
1930	Robert Cameron	Labor
1932	Robert Cameron	Labor
1935	Robert Cameron	Labor
1938	Robert Cameron	Labor
1941	Robert Cameron	Labor
1944	Robert Cameron	Labor
1947	Robert Cameron	Labor
1950	Robert Cameron	Labor
1953	Robert Cameron	Labor
1956	Frank Purdue	Independent
1959	Frank Purdue	Independent
1962	Edward Greaves	Labor
1964 by	Frank Purdue	Independent
1965	Sam Jones	Labor
1968	Sam Jones	Labor
1971	Sam Jones	Labor
1973	Sam Jones	Labor
1976	Sam Jones	Labor
1978	Sam Jones	Labor
1981	Sam Jones	Labor
1984	John Price	Labor
1988	John Price	Labor
1991	John Price	Labor
1995	John Price	Labor

== Election results ==
=== Elections in the 1990s ===
==== 1995 ====
1995 New South Wales state election: Waratah
Party	Candidate	Votes	%	±%
Labor	John Price	20,975	65.7	+0.6
Liberal	Wayne Shoobridge	7,222	22.6	−1.9
Greens	Liz Rene	3,743	11.7	+11.7
Total formal votes		31,940	93.6	+5.4
Informal votes		2,166	6.4	−5.4
Turnout		34,106	95.4	
Two-party-preferred result
Labor	John Price	22,801	74.1	+3.1
Liberal	Wayne Shoobridge	7,972	25.9	−3.1
Labor hold		Swing	+3.1	

==== 1991 ====
1991 New South Wales state election: Waratah
Party	Candidate	Votes	%	±%
Labor	John Price	19,401	65.1	+6.1
Liberal	Mark Booth	7,299	24.5	−8.2
Independent	Milton Caine	2,105	7.1	+7.1
Call to Australia	Stuart Edser	1,008	3.4	+3.4
Total formal votes		29,813	88.3	−7.7
Informal votes		3,968	11.7	+7.7
Turnout		33,781	95.5	
Two-party-preferred result
Labor	John Price	20,258	71.0	+9.3
Liberal	Mark Booth	8,293	29.0	−9.3
Labor hold		Swing	−9.3	

=== Elections in the 1970s ===
==== 1988 ====
1988 New South Wales state election: Waratah
Party	Candidate	Votes	%	±%
Labor	John Price	17,294	61.4	+7.7
Liberal	Milton Caine	10,863	38.6	+10.7
Total formal votes		28,157	95.8	−2.2
Informal votes		1,245	4.2	+2.2
Turnout		29,402	95.6	
Labor hold		Swing	−3.0	

==== 1984 ====
1984 New South Wales state election: Waratah
Party	Candidate	Votes	%	±%
Labor	John Price	13,641	46.8	−23.4
Liberal	Ashley Saunders	7,314	25.1	−0.6
Independent	Sam Jones	6,926	23.8	+23.8
Democrats	Wayne Jarman	1,078	3.7	+3.7
Independent	John Cain	205	0.7	+0.7
Total formal votes		29,164	97.7	+0.6
Informal votes		677	2.3	−0.6
Turnout		29,841	94.5	+1.0
Two-party-preferred result
Labor	John Price	15,816	63.2	−10.4
Liberal	Ashley Saunders	9,220	36.8	+10.4
Labor hold		Swing	−10.4	

==== 1981 ====
1981 New South Wales state election: Waratah
Party	Candidate	Votes	%	±%
Labor	Sam Jones	20,407	70.2	−2.4
Liberal	Pauline Graham	7,484	25.7	+1.6
Communist	Christopher Dodds	1,199	4.1	+0.9
Total formal votes		29,047	97.7	
Informal votes		687	2.3	
Turnout		29,734	94.8	
Two-party-preferred result
Labor	Sam Jones	21,107	73.6	−2.0
Liberal	Pauline Graham	7,574	26.4	+2.0
Labor hold		Swing	−2.0	

=== Elections in the 1970s ===
==== 1978 ====
1978 New South Wales state election: Waratah
Party	Candidate	Votes	%	±%
Labor	Sam Jones	21,100	72.6	+5.2
Liberal	Beryl Humble	7,006	24.1	−8.5
Communist	Christopher Dodds	941	3.2	+3.2
Total formal votes		29,047	97.7	−0.6
Informal votes		687	2.3	+0.6
Turnout		29,734	94.8	+0.3
Two-party-preferred result
Labor	Sam Jones	21,947	75.6	+8.2
Liberal	Beryl Humble	7,100	24.4	−8.2
Labor hold		Swing	+8.2	

==== 1976 ====
1976 New South Wales state election: Waratah
Party	Candidate	Votes	%	±%
Labor	Sam Jones	20,201	67.4	−5.0
Liberal	Richard Bevan	9,786	32.6	+32.6
Total formal votes		29,987	98.3	+1.3
Informal votes		513	1.7	−1.3
Turnout		30,500	94.5	−0.4
Labor hold		Swing	−9.2	

==== 1973 ====
1973 New South Wales state election: Waratah
Party	Candidate	Votes	%	±%
Labor	Sam Jones	21,158	72.4	+3.8
Democratic Labor	Anne McCosker	5,600	19.2	+19.2
Independent	George Wawryck	2,453	8.4	+8.4
Total formal votes		29,211	97.0	
Informal votes		910	3.0	
Turnout		30,121	94.9	
Two-candidate-preferred result
Labor	Sam Jones	22,385	76.6	+8.0
Democratic Labor	Anne McCosker	6,826	23.4	+23.4
Labor hold		Swing	+8.0	

==== 1971 ====
1971 New South Wales state election: Waratah
Party	Candidate	Votes	%	±%
Labor	Sam Jones	18,687	68.6	+10.7
Liberal	Malcolm Blackshaw	8,547	31.4	+31.4
Total formal votes		27,234	98.4	
Informal votes		455	1.6	
Turnout		27,689	94.9	
Labor hold		Swing	+10.7	

=== Elections in the 1960s ===
==== 1968 ====
1968 New South Wales state election: Waratah
Party	Candidate	Votes	%	±%
Labor	Sam Jones	12,642	57.9	+9.7
Independent	Frank Purdue	9,206	42.1	−2.9
Total formal votes		21,848	98.0	
Informal votes		449	2.0	
Turnout		22,297	95.4	
Labor hold		Swing	+7.1	

==== 1965 ====
1965 New South Wales state election: Waratah
Party	Candidate	Votes	%	±%
Labor	Sam Jones	8,748	48.2	−4.5
Independent	Frank Purdue (defeated)	8,173	45.0	−2.3
Democratic Labor	Herbert Collins	824	4.5	+4.5
Independent	Brian Morgan	403	2.2	+2.2
Total formal votes		18,148	98.0	−0.8
Informal votes		363	2.0	+0.8
Turnout		18,511	95.7	+0.1
Two-candidate-preferred result
Labor	Sam Jones	9,217	50.8	−1.9
Independent	Frank Purdue	8,931	49.2	+1.9
Labor hold		Swing	−1.9	

Edward Greaves (Labor) died and Frank Purdue (Independent) won the resulting by-election. Sam Jones regained the seat for Labor.

==== 1964 by-election ====
1964 Waratah by-election Saturday 8 August
Party	Candidate	Votes	%	±%
Independent	Frank Purdue	8,847	51.7	+4.4
Labor	Reg Allen	8,256	48.3	+4.4
Total formal votes		17,103	98.5	−0.3
Informal votes		265	1.5	+0.3
Turnout		17,368	88.5	−7.1
Independent gain from Labor		Swing	+4.4	

Edward Greaves (Labor) died.

==== 1962 ====
1962 New South Wales state election: Waratah
Party	Candidate	Votes	%	±%
Labor	Edward Greaves	10,024	52.7	+6.0
Independent	Frank Purdue	8,998	47.3	−6.0
Total formal votes		19,022	98.8	
Informal votes		224	1.2	
Turnout		19,246	95.6	
Labor gain from Independent		Swing	+6.0	

=== Elections in the 1950s ===
==== 1959 ====
1959 New South Wales state election: Waratah
Party	Candidate	Votes	%	±%
Independent	Frank Purdue	9,472	53.3	
Labor	Edward Greaves	8,292	46.7	
Total formal votes		17,764	98.9	
Informal votes		197	1.1	
Turnout		17,961	96.1	
Independent hold		Swing		

==== 1956 ====
1956 New South Wales state election: Waratah
Party	Candidate	Votes	%	±%
Independent	Frank Purdue	8,829	48.8	+48.8
Labor	Harry Sheedy	6,608	36.6	−31.3
Independent	Harry Edwards	2,201	12.2	+12.2
Communist	Thomas Graham	434	2.4	+2.4
Total formal votes		18,072	98.7	+1.6
Informal votes		235	1.3	−1.6
Turnout		18,307	95.7	−0.2
Two-candidate-preferred result
Independent	Frank Purdue	10,129	56.0	+56.0
Labor	Harry Sheedy	7,943	44.0	−23.9
Independent gain from Labor		Swing	N/A	

==== 1953 ====
1953 New South Wales state election: Waratah
Party	Candidate	Votes	%	±%
Labor	Robert Cameron	12,187	67.9	
Independent	Alfred Hodge	5,760	32.1	
Total formal votes		17,947	97.1	
Informal votes		527	2.9	
Turnout		18,474	95.9	
Labor hold		Swing		

==== 1950 ====
1950 New South Wales state election: Waratah
Party	Candidate	Votes	%	±%
Labor	Robert Cameron	12,114	66.4	
Liberal	Harold Hollis	6,140	33.6	
Total formal votes		18,254	98.6	
Informal votes		262	1.4	
Turnout		18,516	95.5	
Labor hold		Swing		

=== Elections in the 1940s ===
==== 1947 ====
1947 New South Wales state election: Waratah
Party	Candidate	Votes	%	±%
Labor	Robert Cameron	21,551	87.9	+22.1
Independent	Stan Deacon	2,960	12.1	+12.1
Total formal votes		24,511	94.7	−2.7
Informal votes		1,373	5.3	+2.7
Turnout		25,884	95.5	+2.6
Labor hold		Swing	N/A	

==== 1944 ====
1944 New South Wales state election: Waratah
Party	Candidate	Votes	%	±%
Labor	Robert Cameron	15,121	65.8	−20.7
Communist	Stan Deacon	5,102	22.2	+22.2
Lang Labor	Leonard Sweeney	2,760	12.0	+12.0
Total formal votes		22,983	97.4	+0.1
Informal votes		618	2.6	−0.1
Turnout		23,601	92.9	−2.2
Labor hold		Swing	N/A	

- Preferences were not distributed.

==== 1941 ====
1941 New South Wales state election: Waratah
Party	Candidate	Votes	%	±%
Labor	Robert Cameron	19,075	86.5	
Independent	Robert Cram	2,970	13.5	
Total formal votes		22,045	97.3	
Informal votes		612	2.7	
Turnout		22,657	95.1	
Labor hold		Swing		

=== Elections in the 1930s ===
==== 1938 ====
1938 New South Wales state election: Waratah
Party	Candidate	Votes	%	±%
Labor	Robert Cameron	16,442	77.8	+19.0
Communist	Robert Cram	4,693	22.2	+13.8
Total formal votes		21.135	94.4	−2.1
Informal votes		1,249	5.6	+2.1
Turnout		22,384	95.9	−0.9
Labor hold		Swing	N/A	

==== 1935 ====
1935 New South Wales state election: Waratah
Party	Candidate	Votes	%	±%
Labor (NSW)	Robert Cameron	11,451	58.8	+9.9
Federal Labor	Roy McIlveen	6,390	32.8	+22.5
Communist	Douglas Gillies	1,625	8.4	+6.7
Total formal votes		19,466	96.5	−1.4
Informal votes		712	3.5	+1.4
Turnout		20,178	96.8	−1.0
Labor (NSW) hold		Swing	N/A	

- Preferences were not distributed.

==== 1932 ====
1932 New South Wales state election: Waratah
Party	Candidate	Votes	%	±%
Labor (NSW)	Robert Cameron	8,975	48.9	−28.2
United Australia	Arthur Griffiths	7,183	39.1	+17.2
Federal Labor	Arthur Griffith	1,892	10.3	+10.3
Communist	Sidney Bethune	313	1.7	+0.7
Total formal votes		18,363	97.9	−0.1
Informal votes		394	2.1	+0.1
Turnout		18,757	97.8	+2.3
After distribution of preferences
Labor (NSW)	Robert Cameron	9,234	50.3	
United Australia	Arthur Griffiths	7,208	39.2	
Federal Labor	Arthur Griffith	1,921	10.5	
Labor (NSW) hold		Swing	N/A	

- Preferences were not distributed to completion.
- Arthur Griffiths was jointly endorsed by the UAP and Country Party.

==== 1930 ====
1930 New South Wales state election: Waratah
Party	Candidate	Votes	%	±%
Labor	Robert Cameron	13,890	77.1	
Nationalist	Harold Sharp	3,936	21.9	
Communist	David Martin	183	1.0	
Total formal votes		18,009	98.0	
Informal votes		369	2.0	
Turnout		18,378	95.5	
Labor win		(new seat)		

Robert Cameron (Labor) was the sitting member for the abolished district of Wallsend which was partly replaced by Waratah.

District re-created

==== 1913 - 1930 ====
District abolished

District abolished

=== Elections in the 1910s ===
==== 1910 ====
1910 New South Wales state election: Waratah
Party	Candidate	Votes	%	±%
Labour	John Estell	3,957	85.0	
Liberal Reform	Thomas Collins	697	15.0	
Total formal votes		4,654	96.3	
Informal votes		178	3.7	
Turnout		4,832	61.3	
Labour hold				

=== Elections in the 1900s ===
==== 1907 ====
1907 New South Wales state election: Waratah
Party	Candidate	Votes	%	±%
Labour	John Estell	3,214	84.6	
Independent	David Renfrew	585	15.4	
Total formal votes		3,799	93.7	
Informal votes		256	6.3	
Turnout		4,055	54.5	
Labour hold				

==== 1904 ====
1904 New South Wales state election: Waratah
Party	Candidate	Votes	%	±%
Labour	John Estell	2,112	80.6	
Liberal Reform	Charles Turner	508	19.4	
Total formal votes		2,620	99.1	
Informal votes		23	0.9	
Turnout		2,643	37.1	
Labour hold				

Waratah lost parts of the seat to Wickham and Kahibah and was expanded to include part of the abolished seats of East Maitland and Wallsend. John Estell (Labour) was the member for Wallsend. The member for Waratah was Matthew Charlton (Labour) who successfully contested Northumberland while the member for East Maitland, James Brunker (Liberal Reform), unsuccessfully contested Maitland.

==== 1903 by-election ====
1903 Waratah by-election Saturday 5 December
Party	Candidate	Votes	%	±%
Labour	Matthew Charlton	1,085	67.6	+8.7
Independent	John Gilbert	519	32.4	
Total formal votes		4,604	99.4	+0.1
Informal votes		9	0.6	−0.1
Turnout		1,613	61.9 (Note: Estimate based on a roll of 2,607 at the 1901 election.)	−10.1
Labour hold		Swing		

Arthur Griffith (Labour) resigned to unsuccessfully contest a seat in the Senate at the 1903 federal election.

==== 1901 ====
1901 New South Wales state election: Waratah
Party	Candidate	Votes	%	±%
Labour	Arthur Griffith	1,099	58.9	+8.6
Ind. Progressive	William Sharp	766	41.1	
Total formal votes		1,865	99.3	−0.1
Informal votes		13	0.7	+0.1
Turnout		1,878	72.0	+3.3
Labour hold				

=== Elections in the 1890s ===
==== 1898 ====
1898 New South Wales colonial election: Waratah
Party	Candidate	Votes	%	±%
Labour	Arthur Griffith	817	50.4	
National Federal	John Gilbert	805	49.6	
Total formal votes		817	100.0	
Informal votes		1,622	0.0	
Turnout		9	0.6	
Labour hold				

==== 1895 ====
1895 New South Wales colonial election: Waratah
Party	Candidate	Votes	%	±%
Labour	Arthur Griffith	854	53.3	
Protectionist	Ninian Melville	661	41.3	
Ind. Free Trade	William Conn	83	5.2	
Independent Labour	James McWilliams	4	0.3	
Total formal votes		1,602	98.0	
Informal votes		33	2.0	
Turnout		1,635	78.1	
Labour hold				

==== 1894 ====
1894 New South Wales colonial election: Waratah
Party	Candidate	Votes	%	±%
Labour	Arthur Griffith	820	44.2	
Protectionist	Ninian Melville	680	36.6	
Free Trade	Alfred Clapin	356	19.2	
Total formal votes		1,856	99.3	
Informal votes		13	0.7	
Turnout		1,869	87.9	
Labour win		(new seat)		
