= 1965 New South Wales state election =

State election for New South Wales, Australia in May 1965

- 1 May 1965

All 94 seats in the New South Wales Legislative Assembly 48 Assembly seats were needed for a majority
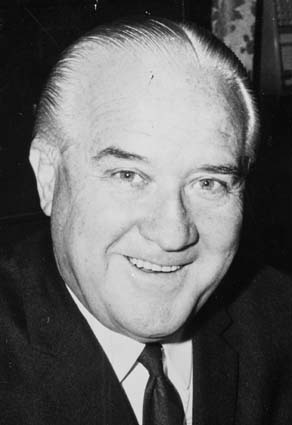

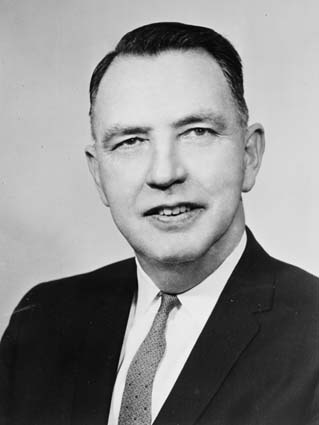
| | First party | Second party |
|---|---|---|
| Leader | Robert Askin | Jack Renshaw |
| Party | Liberal/Country coalition | Labor |
| Leader since | 17 July 1959 | 30 April 1964 |
| Leader's seat | Collaroy | Castlereagh |
| Last election | 39 seats | 54 seats |
| Seats won | 47 | 45 |
| Seat change | ▲8 | ▼9 |
| Percentage | 49.82% | 43.31% |
| Swing | ▲5.60 | ▼5.26 |
- Two-candidate-preferred margin by electorate
Premier before election
Jack Renshaw
Labor
Elected Premier
Bob Askin
Liberal/Country coalition

The 1965 New South Wales state election was held on 1 May 1965. It was conducted in single member constituencies with compulsory preferential voting and was held on boundaries created at a 1961 redistribution. The election was for all of the 94 seats in the Legislative Assembly.

== Issues ==
In May 1965, Labor had been in power for 24 years and 56-year-old Jack Renshaw, who had been seen as a generational change for the party leadership, had been premier for one year. Yet Renshaw had difficulty adjusting to a televised campaign; and his manner, the result of spending much of his early life in remote New South Wales, had limited appeal to urban voters. The longevity of the government was an issue promoted by the opposition which described it as being composed of "tired old men"; indeed, six members of Renshaw's cabinet were 65 years old or older, and most of them had been in cabinet during Labor's entire 24-year run in government.

Continuing cost overruns and construction delays at the Sydney Opera House made problematic the Renshaw government's claims of sound economic management. Causing further damage were accusations that the Speaker, Ray Maher, had indecently exposed himself to a staff member. This scandal disrupted the start of the government's campaign.

Moreover the government's keynote policy of releasing large tracts of land in Sydney for residential development was leaked to the opposition, which then claimed the plan as its own policy. The ALP continued to have an ideological difficulty matching the Opposition's promises of state aid for non-government schools, and this was the most decisive issue in the election. Other government policies included increased high school bursaries, measures to reduce unfair trading, reduced power costs, increased sick leave and reform of Workers' Compensation schemes.

In contrast to Renshaw, Robert Askin (who had been the leader of the conservative coalition since 1959) was skilled in his use of television and put forward a positive program. This included promises for non-government schools included free transport, library grants, low interest loans, textbook subsidies and bursaries. Askin accused Renshaw's administration of having allowed the transport infrastructure of the state to decay. Also, Askin pledged that if he won the election, he would order improvements to the Illawarra and Eastern Suburbs rail lines. He promised to integrate the state's bus and train fares and reduce suburban rail costs. Motor registry costs would be reduced and better rent control was to be introduced for pensioners. Askin, in addition, promised to recruit more police, and provide more resources for mental health and district hospitals.

== Results ==
Prior to the election, Independent Frank Purdue had gained the seat of Waratah from the Labor Party at a by-election caused by the death of Edward Greaves. Sam Jones regained the seat for Labor at the general election.

Despite a strong swing of more than 5% to the Coalition, the result of the election remained in doubt for two weeks. The effects of a long incumbency bolstered by the cumulative effects of a number of re-distributions limited Labor's losses to nine seats. In several of these the margin of defeat was less than 300 votes. In the final result the Coalition had 47 seats, one short of a majority. However, it could rely on the support of two conservative independents--Douglas Darby, a former Liberal who was subsequently readmitted to the party room, and Harold Coates, who had won the seat of Hartley. After providing a Speaker, the coalition was able to form a government with a three-seat majority in the Assembly, ending 24 years and eight terms of Labor government.

- Liberal 31 seats
- Independent Liberal 1 seat
- Country Party 16 seats
- Australian Labor Party 45 seats
- Independent 1 seat

The DLP contested 28 seats and, while it gained less than 2.5% of the statewide primary vote, its preferences strongly favoured the coalition and were vital to its success. The Communist party was reduced to 13 candidates who received negligible support.

== Seats changing party representation ==
This table lists changes in party representation since the 1965 election

| Seat | Incumbent member | Party | New member | Party |
|---|---|---|---|---|
| Bligh | Tom Morey | Labor | Morton Cohen | Liberal |
| Coogee | Lou Walsh | Labor | Kevin Ellis | Liberal |
| Goulburn | Laurie Tully | Labor | Ron Brewer | Country |
| Hartley | James Robson | Labor | Harold Coates | Independent |
| Hurstville | Bill Rigby | Labor | Tom Mead | Liberal |
| Lismore | Keith Compton | Labor | Bruce Duncan | Country |
| Monaro | John Seiffert | Labor | Steve Mauger | Liberal |
| Nepean | Alfred Bennett | Labor | Ron Dunbier | Liberal |
| Wollongong-Kembla | Doug Porter | Labor | Jack Hough | Liberal |

== Key dates ==
| Date | Event |
|---|---|
| 31 March 1965 | The Legislative Assembly was dissolved, and writs were issued by the Governor to proceed with an election. |
| 5 April 1965 | Nominations for candidates for the election closed at noon. |
| 1 May 1965 | Polling day. |
| 28 May 1965 | Last day for the writs to be returned and the results formally declared. |
| 26 May 1965 | Opening of 41st Parliament. |

== Results ==
New South Wales state election, 1 May 1965 Legislative Assembly << 1962–1968 >>
| Enrolled voters | 2,256,568 (Note: There were 2,218,550 enrolled voters in 92 contested electorates and 38,018 were enrolled in 2 uncontested electorates (1 Labor, 1 Country).) | | | | |
| Votes cast | 2,083,361 | | Turnout | 93.91 | −0.09 |
| Informal votes | 42,571 | | Informal | 2.04 | +0.50 |
Summary of votes by party
| Party | Primary votes | % | Swing | Seats | Change |
| Liberal | 807,868 | 39.59 | +4.74 | 31 | +6 |
| Country | 208,826 | 10.23 | +0.86 | 16 | +2 |
| Labor | 883,824 | 43.31 | −5.26 | 45 | −9 |
| Independent | 63,680 | 3.12 | −0.01 | 1 | +1 |
| Democratic Labor | 43,109 | 2.11 | −1.02 | 0 | − |
| Independent Liberal | 20,400 | 1.00 | −0.95 | 1 | 0 |
| Communist | 13,082 | 0.64 | +0.01 | 0 | − |
| Total | 2,040,789 | | | 94 | |

Popular vote
| Labor | 43.31% |
| Liberal | 39.59% |
| Country | 10.23% |
| Independents | 4.12% |
| Democratic Labor | 2.11% |
| Communist | 0.64% |
Parliamentary seats
| Labor | 45 |
| Liberal | 31 |
| Country | 16 |
| Independents | 2 |

== Aftermath ==
Robert Askin and Charles Cutler became Premier and Deputy Premier in New South Wales' first conservative government for 24 years. Renshaw became Leader of the Opposition, a post he held throughout the term of the parliament. During this parliament there were 3 by-elections. These resulted in the Country party gaining one seat from Labor and one seat from the Liberal Party.

== See also ==
- Members of the New South Wales Legislative Assembly, 1965–1968
