= Members of the New South Wales Legislative Assembly, 1965–1968 =

This is a list of members of the New South Wales Legislative Assembly who served in the 41st parliament held their seats from 1965 to 1968. They were elected at the 1965 state election, and at by-elections. The Speaker was Sir Kevin Ellis.

Name	Party	Electorate	Term in office
Robert Askin	Liberal	Collaroy	1950–1975
Brian Bannon	Labor	Rockdale	1959–1986
Jack Beale	Liberal	South Coast	1942–1973
Ken Booth	Labor	Wallsend	1960–1988
Lionel Bowen	Labor	Randwick	1962–1969
George Brain	Liberal	Willoughby	1943–1968
Ron Brewer	Country	Goulburn	1965–1984
Jim Brown	Country	Raleigh	1959–1984
Tim Bruxner	Country	Tenterfield	1962–1981
Tom Cahill	Labor	Cook's River	1959–1983
Bill Chaffey	Country	Tamworth	1940–1973
Jim Clough	Liberal	Eastwood	1956–1988
Reg Coady	Labor	Drummoyne	1954–1973
Harold Coates	Independent	Blue Mountains	1965–1976
Morton Cohen (Note: Bligh Liberal MLA Morton Cohen died on 14 January 1968. No by-election was held due to the imminent 1968 state election.)	Liberal	Bligh	1965–1968
Bruce Cowan (Note: Oxley Liberal MLA Les Jordan died on 29 September 1965. Country Party candidate Bruce Cowan won the resulting by-election on 6 November.)	Country	Oxley	1965–1980
Peter Cox	Labor	Auburn	1965–1988
Bill Crabtree	Labor	Kogarah	1953–1983
Geoff Crawford	Country	Barwon	1950–1976
Douglas Cross	Liberal	Georges River	1948–1953, 1956–1970
Charles Cutler	Country	Orange	1947–1975
Tom Dalton	Labor	Sutherland	1953–1968
Douglas Darby	Independent	Manly	1945–1978
Bernie Deane	Liberal	Hawkesbury	1950–1972
Frank Downing	Labor	Vaucluse	1953–1968
Keith Doyle	Liberal	Ryde	1965–1978
Ron Dunbier	Liberal	Nepean	1965–1971
Bruce Duncan	Country	Lismore	1965–1988
Vince Durick	Labor	Lakemba	1964–1984
Clarrie Earl	Labor	Bass Hill	1953–1973
Syd Einfeld (Note: Bondi Labor MLA Abe Landa resigned on 25 September 1965 in order to accept the position of state Agent-General in London. Labor candidate Syd Einfeld won the resulting by-election on 6 November.)	Labor	Bondi	1965–1981
Kevin Ellis	Liberal	Coogee	1948–1953, 1956–1962, 1965–1973
Jack Ferguson	Labor	Merrylands	1959–1984
Howard Fowles	Labor	Illawarra	1941–1968
Wal Fife	Liberal	Wagga Wagga	1957–1975
Pat Flaherty	Labor	Granville	1962–1984
George Freudenstein	Country	Young	1959–1981
Al Grassby	Labor	Murrumbidgee	1965–1969
Fred Green	Labor	Redfern	1950–1968
Ian Griffith	Liberal	Cronulla	1956–1978
Frank Hawkins	Labor	Newcastle	1935–1968
Dick Healey	Liberal	Wakehurst	1962–1981
Bob Heffron	Labor	Botany	1930–1968
Jack Hough	Liberal	Wollongong-Kembla	1965–1971
Pat Hills	Labor	Phillip	1954–1988
Davis Hughes	Country	Armidale	1950–1953, 1956–1973
Ted Humphries	Liberal	Gosford	1965–1971
David Hunter	Liberal	Ashfield-Croydon	1940–1976
John Jackett	Liberal	Burwood	1965–1978
Rex Jackson	Labor	Bulli	1955–1986
Harry Jago	Liberal	Gordon	1962–1973
Harry Jensen	Labor	Wyong	1965–1981
Lew Johnstone	Labor	Broken Hill	1965–1981
Sam Jones	Labor	Waratah	1965–1984
Les Jordan	Liberal	Oxley	1944–1965
Nick Kearns	Labor	Bankstown	1962–1980
Gus Kelly (Note: Bathurst Labor MLA Gus Kelly died on 25 March 1967. Country Party candidate Clive Osborne won the resulting by-election on 6 May.)	Labor	Bathurst	1925–1932, 1935–1967
Joe Kelly	Labor	East Hills	1956–1973
Abe Landa	Labor	Bondi	1930–1965
Joe Lawson (Note: Murray MLA Joe Lawson was elected as a Country Party member, but resigned to contest the 1968 election as an independent. He had previously planned to retire, but was dissatisfied with his preselected replacement.)	Country	Murray	1932–1973
Tom Lewis	Liberal	Wollondilly	1957–1978
Gordon Mackie	Liberal	Albury	1965–1978
John Maddison	Liberal	Hornsby	1962–1980
Dan Mahoney	Labor	Parramatta	1959–1976
Cliff Mallam	Labor	Dulwich Hill	1953–1968, 1971–1981
Jack Mannix	Labor	Liverpool	1952–1971
Richmond Manyweathers	Country	Casino	1964–1968
John Mason	Liberal	Dubbo	1965–1981
Steve Mauger	Liberal	Monaro	1965–1976
Robert McCartney	Labor	Hamilton	1959–1971
Ken McCaw	Liberal	Lane Cove	1947–1975
John McMahon	Labor	Balmain	1950–1968
Tom Mead	Liberal	Hurstville	1965–1976
Milton Morris	Liberal	Maitland	1956–1980
Pat Morton	Liberal	Mosman	1947–1972
Thomas Murphy	Labor	Concord	1953–1968
George Neilly	Labor	Cessnock	1959–1978
Leo Nott	Labor	Burrendong	1953–1973
Frank O'Keefe	Country	Upper Hunter	1961–1969
Clive Osborne	Country	Bathurst	1967–1981
Leon Punch	Country	Gloucester	1959–1985
Ernie Quinn	Labor	Wentworthville	1962–1988
Jack Renshaw	Labor	Castlereagh	1941–1980
Max Ruddock	Liberal	The Hills	1962–1976
Norm Ryan	Labor	Marrickville	1953–1973
Bill Sheahan	Labor	Burrinjuck	1941–1973
Jim Simpson	Labor	Lake Macquarie	1950–1968
Albert Sloss	Labor	King	1956–1973
Jim Southee	Labor	Blacktown	1962–1973
Stanley Stephens	Country	Byron	1944–1973
Jack Stewart	Labor	Kahibah	1957–1972
Kevin Stewart	Labor	Canterbury	1962–1985
Jim Taylor	Country	Temora	1960–1981
John Waddy	Liberal	Kirribilli	1962–1976
William Wattison	Labor	Sturt	1947–1968
Bill Weiley	Country	Clarence	1955–1971
Eric Willis	Liberal	Earlwood	1950–1978

== See also ==
- First Askin ministry
- Results of the 1965 New South Wales state election
- Candidates of the 1965 New South Wales state election
