= 1964 Waratah state by-election =

Election for the New South Wales Legislative Assembly seat of Waratah

A by-election was held for the New South Wales Legislative Assembly seat of Waratah on 19 September 1964. It was triggered by the death of Edward Greaves (Labor).

== Dates ==
Date	Event
4 July 1964	Death of Edward Greaves.
15 July 1964	Writ of election issued by the Speaker of the Legislative Assembly.
20 July 1964	Date of nomination
8 August 1964	Polling day
9 September 1964	Return of writ

== Result ==
1964 Waratah by-election Saturday 8 August
Party	Candidate	Votes	%	±%
Independent	Frank Purdue	8,847	51.7	+4.4
Labor	Reg Allen	8,256	48.3	+4.4
Total formal votes		17,103	98.5	−0.3
Informal votes		265	1.5	+0.3
Turnout		17,368	88.5	−7.1
Independent gain from Labor		Swing	+4.4	

== See also ==
- Electoral results for the district of Waratah
- List of New South Wales state by-elections
