= Morton Cohen =

Morton Cohen may refer to:

- Morton Cohen (politician) (1913–1968), Australian politician
- Morton N. Cohen (1921–2017), American author and scholar
