= 1903 Waratah state by-election =

Election result for Waratah, New South Wales, Australia

A by-election was held for the New South Wales Legislative Assembly electorate of Waratah on 5 December 1903 because of the resignation of Arthur Griffith (Labour) to unsuccessfully contest a seat in the Senate at the 1903 federal election.

== Dates ==
Date	Event
18 November 1903	Arthur Griffith resigned.
19 November 1903	Writ of election issued by the Speaker of the Legislative Assembly.
27 November 1903	Nominations
5 December 1903	Polling day
16 December 1903	Federal election
18 December 1903	Return of writ

== Result ==
1903 Waratah by-election Saturday 5 December
Party	Candidate	Votes	%	±%
Labour	Matthew Charlton	1,085	67.6	+8.7
Independent	John Gilbert	519	32.4	
Total formal votes		4,604	99.4	+0.1
Informal votes		9	0.6	−0.1
Turnout		1,613	61.9 (Note: Estimate based on a roll of 2,607 at the 1901 election.)	−10.1
Labour hold		Swing		

== See also ==
- Electoral results for the district of Waratah
- List of New South Wales state by-elections
