= Kathleen Taperell =

Australian public servant

Kathleen Joan Taperell AM, also known as Kathleen Tucker (born 15 February 1939), is an Australian public servant and feminist.

She was born in Sydney and attended Eastwood Public School and Our Lady of Mercy College in Parramatta. In 1959 she received a Bachelor of Arts from the University of Sydney, subsequently receiving a Diploma of Education from the University of New England in 1969. She married John Tucker and used his name for some time before returning to her maiden name. She was a teacher from 1967 to 1972 and then became electorate secretary to federal MP John Kerin; she also ran as the Labor candidate for Nepean at the 1973 state election. She worked as a public servant from 1974 with the Royal Commission on Australian Government Administration, the Public Service Board and, from 1977, the Office of Women's Affairs. In 1978 she was appointed Director of the office, a position she held until 1983; during this period she was also convenor of the Women's Film Fund Advisory Panel and the Australian delegation to the World Conference of the UN Decade for Women in 1980.

In 1984, Taperell moved to the Department of Foreign Affairs, and in 1986 she worked for the Special Minister of State. From 1986 to 1990 she was assistant secretary of the Prime Minister's Department. She became a senior adviser to the Minister for Aboriginal and Torres Strait Islander Affairs in 1990. In 1990 she was made a Member of the Order of Australia for public service.
