= Patrick Shepherd =

Australian politician

Patrick Lindesay Crawford Shepherd (17 March 1831 – 3 July 1903), commonly referred to as P. L. C. Shepherd, was an Australian seed merchant and politician.

He was born in Sydney to nurseryman Thomas Shepherd and Jane Henderson. He was a stockman before joining his father at their nursery at Newtown. He established his own seed and plant business. On 19 May 1857 he married Isabella Deane (1830–1876), daughter of John Philip Deane, with whom he had ten children; a second marriage, on 15 December 1877 to Sarah Jane Una "Jennie" Barnier (1849–1945), produced a further seven children. He joined the Volunteer Artillery in 1861, retiring a major in 1876. In 1874 he was elected to the New South Wales Legislative Assembly for Nepean, but he retired in 1877. In 1888 he was appointed to the New South Wales Legislative Council, where he remained until his death at Burwood in 1903.

New South Wales Legislative Assembly
Preceded by Joseph Single	Member for Nepean; 1874–1877	Succeeded by Thomas Smith
