= Nick Gorshenin =

Australian politician (1922–2005)

Nicholas Gorshenin (25 October 1922 – 9 October 2005) was a shark meshing contractor, North Sydney Council alderman and one of the founders of the Liberal Reform Group, which became the Australia Party. The preferences from the Australia Party in the 1972 elections assisted the Australian Labor Party under Gough Whitlam bring to an end 23 years of Liberal Country Party rule. The Australia Party later merged with Democrats to become the Australian Democrats.

== Early life ==
Gorshenin was born in Vladivostok, Russia, the fourth child and eldest son of five children from Nickolai Gorshenin, who was a Colonel in the Imperial Russian Army, and Anastasia Gorshenin (née Branski). The family became separated in the chaos after the fall of Vladivostok, the last city to hold out from the Bolshevik revolution. His mother had to trek the harsh Siberian landscape, with her two young daughters and one-week-old baby Nick, to Harbin to meet up with her husband.

Arriving in Brisbane as refugees, young Gorshenin lived his early childhood amongst the cane fields of Innisfail, near Cairns before moving to Balmain where his father worked in the coal mine and later to Camperdown. Gorshenin reluctantly left school at the age 15 to work in his father's petrol station. His younger brother, Alex went on to study medicine at Sydney University and became a leading ear, nose and throat specialist.

Gorshenin spent the last few years of World War II on the Indonesian island of Morotai. Gorshenin began commercial fishing, out of Eden on the NSW south coast. In the early 1950s he meshed the beaches around Newcastle as a contractor for the NSW government. Based in Stockton, he met and soon married Joan Sturrock. Gorshenin and Joan had three children: Nick, Anne and Peter. In 1954 Gorshenin gained the Sydney shark meshing contract and the family moved to Sydney. Gorshenin was an international shark expert, sometimes appearing in the media. He helped to establish shark meshing in Queensland and South Africa.

Nick in the cabin of his trawler, Irene H

Living at Lavender Bay, North Sydney, Gorshenin became involved in local community organisations, including the North Sydney Demonstration School P&C, Meals on Wheels, North Sydney Younger Set and the McMahon's Point Progress Association, leading him to being elected as an alderman on North Sydney council in 1960.

== Political career ==
Gorshenin was elected as an alderman on North Sydney Council in 1960.

Gorshenin ran as an Independent for Kirribilli in the 1965 NSW elections. He convinced the Australian Labor Party (ALP) not to field a candidate against the sitting Liberal member and was mounting a strong challenge before the ALP made a last minute decision to run a candidate. Gorshenin garnered 9.7% of the vote.

Gorshenin also ran as an Independent in the seat of North Sydney in the 1966 Australian Federal Election.

On 22 October 1966 when U.S. President Lyndon Johnson was visiting Sydney, local entrepreneurs Gordon Barton and Ken Thomas financed a full page advertisement in the Sydney Morning Herald, lamenting Australia's involvement in the Vietnam War. Gorshenin rang Gordon Barton that night to congratulate him and they agreed to form a political organisation, namely the Liberal Reform Group (soon amended to Liberal Reform Movement), to become the first political party in Australia to campaign for the removal of Australian troops from the war. Around the same time, his wife Joan was Social Secretary of the India League and met Indira Gandhi when she visited Sydney in May 1968.

Gorshenin used his contacts in Sydney, Newcastle, New England and Brisbane to form a number of party branches. They changed the name to the Australia Party to contest the 1969 federal elections and Gorshenin was the Campaign Director.

The Australia Party became a significant force in the 1972 elections in nullifying the power of the Democratic Labour Party (DLP) to assist the Australian Labor Party under Gough Whitlam to victory, ending 23 years of Liberal Party/Country Party coalition rule.

Gorshenin maintained a strong interest in local and international politics after leaving the Australia Party in the mid-1970s. Joan died in 1987 and Gorshenin in 2005.
