= James Tobias Ryan =

Australian politician

James Tobias Ryan (4 January 1818 – 17 October 1899) was an Australian politician.

== Life ==
He was born at South Creek near Penrith to ex-convict printer John Michael Tobin Ryan and Mary Rope. After a brief education he worked as a timber getter, ploughman, milkman and horsebreaker with his father, and then settled on the Nepean River. On 16 August 1838 he married Mary Dempsey, with whom he had seven children. From 1840 he worked as a butcher at Penrith, and he also acquired property on the Macquarie and Castlereagh rivers. He built the grand Emu Hall on the Nepean River, and in 1860 was elected to the New South Wales Legislative Assembly for Nepean. He served until his defeat in 1872. By this time his gambling had left him bankrupt and he subsequently worked as a hotelier and asphalter before being bankrupted again in 1885. He worked as a land valuator and ran a boarding house until his death at Woolloomooloo in 1899.

New South Wales Legislative Assembly
Preceded by Robert Jamison	Member for Nepean; 1860–1872	Succeeded by Joseph Single
