= Joseph Single =

Australian politician

Joseph Daniel Single (22 February 1826 – 29 December 1900) was an Australian politician.

He was born around Castlereagh to farmer John Single and Sarah Baker. He became a pastoralist and held the Tellaraga station in the Gwydir district. Around 1854 he married Ann Lydia Frazer, with whom he had sixteen children. In 1872 he was elected to the New South Wales Legislative Assembly for Nepean, but he did not re-contest in 1874. Single died at Lambridge near Penrith in 1900.

New South Wales Legislative Assembly
Preceded by James Ryan	Member for Nepean; 1872–1874	Succeeded by Patrick Shepherd
