= Thomas Richard Smith =

Australian politician

Thomas Richard Smith (1843 – 23 July 1918) was an Australian politician.

He was born at Mount Druitt to publican Thomas Smith and Jane Laimbeer. He attended a local Anglican school and became a commercial agent. He later worked as a produce merchant, business owner, wheat farmer and publican. He was also a Penrith alderman, and served as mayor from 1889 to 1890. In 1877 he was elected to the New South Wales Legislative Assembly as the member for Nepean. He was defeated in 1887, having become loosely associated with the free traders, but over the next few years contested elections as a Protectionist, winning Nepean again in 1895. He was defeated in 1898 but elected again in 1901. In 1904 the Assembly was reduced in size, and he was defeated running for Sherbrooke. Smith had married Kerzia Colless in 1867; they had four children. He died at Penrith in 1918.

New South Wales Legislative Assembly
Preceded by Patrick Shepherd	Member for Nepean; 1877–1887	Succeeded by Samuel Lees
Preceded by Samuel Lees	Member for Nepean; 1895–1898	Succeeded by Samuel Lees
Preceded by Samuel Lees	Member for Nepean; 1901–1904	Abolished
