= Samuel Lees =

Australian politician

The Honourable Samuel Edward Lees
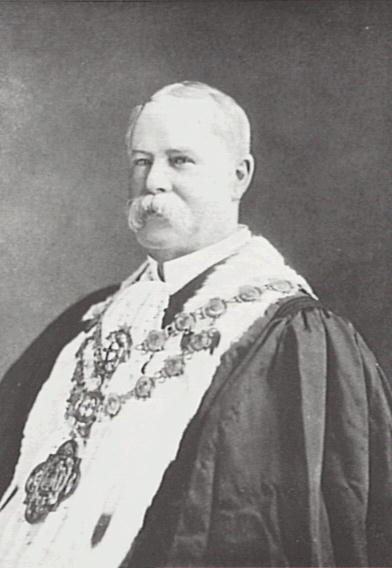
- Samuel Edward Lees, Lord Mayor of Sydney (1904)

38th Mayor of Sydney
- In office 1 January 1895 – 31 December 1895
- Preceded by: William Manning
- Succeeded by: Isaac Ives

Lord Mayor of Sydney
- In office 1 January 1904 – 31 December 1904
- Preceded by: Allen Taylor
- Succeeded by: Thomas Hughes

Alderman of the Sydney City Council
- In office 1 December 1879 – 30 November 1909

Member of the Legislative Council of New South Wales
- In office 13 August 1895 – 18 July 1898

Personal details
- Born: 1 January 1843 Sydney, New South Wales, Australia
- Died: 14 June 1916 (aged 73) Potts Point, New South Wales, Australia
- Spouse(s): Sarah Amy Davies (m. 1871)
- Occupation: Businessman, politician and philanthropist

Samuel Edward Lees (1843 – 14 June 1916) was an Australian politician.

Born in Sydney to painter and glazier Samuel Lees and Caroline Whitehead, he attended William Street National School but was mostly self-educated. He was apprenticed as a printer and ultimately owned his own printing works from around 1869, expanding into several other interests including building companies in the 1880s. On 30 September 1871 he married Sarah Amy Davies, with whom he had five children. From 1879 to 1909 he was a member of Sydney City Council, serving as mayor in 1895 and 1904. In 1887 he was elected to the New South Wales Legislative Assembly as the Free Trade member for Nepean, serving until 1895 and then again from 1898 to 1901. Lees died in 1916 at Potts Point.

New South Wales Legislative Assembly
Preceded by Thomas Smith	Member for Nepean; 1887–1895	Succeeded by Thomas Smith
Preceded by Thomas Smith	Member for Nepean; 1898–1901	Succeeded by Thomas Smith
Civic offices
Preceded by Sir William Patrick Manning	Mayor of Sydney; 1895	Succeeded by Isaac Ives
Preceded by Allen Taylor	Lord Mayor of Sydney; 1904	Succeeded by Thomas Hughes
