= Robert Cameron (New South Wales politician) =

Australian politician

Robert Cameron, OBE (29 October 1890 – 21 May 1970) was an Australian politician. He was a member of the New South Wales Legislative Assembly from 1927 until 1956. He was a member of the Labor Party.

Cameron was born in the Hunter Region coal mining town of Minmi. He was the son of a coal-miner and was educated to elementary level at Plattsburg public school. His initial employment was as a coal miner at the Wallsend Colliery at the age of 14. He was an office-holder in the Miners' Federation prior to his election to parliament.

Following the abolition of multi-member seats elected by proportional representation at the 1927 election, Cameron won ALP pre-selection and the general election for the seat of Wallsend. This seat was abolished in a redistribution before the 1930 state election and Cameron was subsequently elected to the seat of Waratah. He remained the representative for this seat until his retirement in 1956.

On 1 January 1963, Cameron was named an Officer of the Order of the British Empire "in recognition of public service in New South Wales."

New South Wales Legislative Assembly
Preceded by New seat	Member for Wallsend; 1927–1930	Succeeded by Abolished
Preceded by New seat	Member for Waratah; 1930–1956	Succeeded by Frank Purdue
