= Bill Chapman (politician) =

Australian politician

Personal details
- Born: 7 February 1910 Singleton, New South Wales
- Died: 22 July 1971 (aged 61) Penrith, New South Wales
- Party: Liberal Party

William Leslie Chapman (7 February 1910 – 22 July 1971) was an Australian politician and a member of the New South Wales Legislative Assembly between 1956 and 1962. He was a member of the Liberal Party.

== Early life ==
Chapman was born in Singleton, New South Wales. He was the son of a policeman and was raised by his grandparents in the Penrith area. He was educated to elementary level and initially worked as a porter for the New South Wales Government Railways but was retrenched during the Great Depression. He commenced a carrier business in 1934 with one truck and eventually built this into a 24-truck fleet. He was involved in community groups in the Penrith region including Rotary and the Australian Red Cross. Chapman was elected as an alderman to Penrith City Council between 1948 and 1959 and between 1961 and 1971. He was the mayor between 1950 and 1956 and between 1961 and 1968.

== State politics ==
Chapman was elected to the New South Wales Parliament as the Liberal Party member for Nepean in 1956. The sitting Liberal member Joseph Jackson had retired and Chapman defeated Jim Chalmers, the Independent Labor member for Hartley, who attempted to transfer to Nepean. Chapman retained the seat at the 1959 election. He was defeated by Labor's Alfred Bennett in 1962 after an unfavourable redistribution made Nepean a notionally Labor seat. He failed to gain Liberal Party endorsement for the 1965 election and left the party in 1966. He did not hold a ministerial, party or parliamentary position.

Civic offices
Preceded by Patros Athanas Tornaros	Mayor of Penrith; 1949–1956	Succeeded by Bernard Fowler
Preceded by Leo Spies	Mayor of Penrith; 1961–1968	Succeeded by Ron Mulock
New South Wales Legislative Assembly
Preceded by Joseph Jackson	Member for Nepean; 1956–1962	Succeeded by Alfred Bennett
