= Bill Rigby (politician) =

Australian politician

William Matthew Rigby (14 October 1923 – 2 June 2003) was an Australian politician. He was a Labor Party member of the New South Wales Legislative Assembly from 1959 to 1965, representing the electorate of Hurstville.

Rigby was born in Newcastle, and educated at Summer Hill High School in Sydney. He worked as a clerk in the stores branch of the Railways Department prior to entering state politics. He served as a private in the Second Australian Imperial Force during World War II from 1943 to 1945, returning to his prior role as a clerk thereafter. He was seconded for a year as private secretary to state Minister for Housing Clive Evatt in 1952–1953; the subsequent decision of the Public Service Board not to retain his services led to legal action on Rigby's part. He was elected to the City of Rockdale council in 1953, serving until his election to parliament in 1959.

Rigby was preselected as the Labor candidate for Hurstville at the 1959 state election, challenging the incumbent MLA, Clive Evatt, who had fallen out with the party and was contesting the election as an independent. Rigby easily won the seat, with Evatt finishing third behind the Liberal candidate. Rigby was comfortably re-elected in 1962, but was narrowly defeated by Liberal candidate Tom Mead in the 1965 state election, amidst Labor's heavy statewide defeat.

Rigby remained involved in public life after his parliamentary defeat, serving as president of the Miscellaneous Workers' Union from 1966 to 1973. He also served for a time as a special adviser to Senator Doug McClelland, and was involved in a number of Aboriginal social welfare groups. He died in 2003.

New South Wales Legislative Assembly
Preceded by Clive Evatt	Member for Hurstville; 1959 – 1965	Succeeded by Tom Mead
