= Alfred Bennett (Australian politician) =

Australian politician

Alfred Ernest Bennett (25 July 1906 – 15 April 1976) was an Australian politician. He was a Labor Party member of the New South Wales Legislative Assembly from 1962 to 1965, representing the electorate of Nepean.

Bennett was born in Cargo, and educated at various Roman Catholic schools in New South Wales. He was a motor body builder and carpenter by trade. He was involved in trade unionism, being associated with the Building Workers' Industrial Union and serving as a delegate to the Labor Council of New South Wales. He also served in local government as an alderman of the City of Penrith from 1960 to 1962.

Bennett was selected to contest the local seat of Nepean for Labor at the 1962 state election. An electoral redistribution had changed the long-time Liberal seat into a notional Labor seat, and Bennett won a tight race against the incumbent Liberal member, Bill Chapman. He was only to serve one term, however; he was narrowly defeated at the 1965 election by Liberal candidate Ron Dunbier.

He died at Gosford on 15 April 1976.

New South Wales Legislative Assembly
Preceded by Bill Chapman	Member for Nepean; 1962 – 1965	Succeeded by Ron Dunbier
