= Tom Morey (politician) =

Australian politician

Member of the New South Wales Legislative Assembly for Bligh
- In office 3 March 1962 – 31 March 1965
- Preceded by: District created
- Succeeded by: Morton Cohen

Personal details
- Born: Thomas Irving Morey; 6 February 1906 Armidale, New South Wales, Australia
- Died: 11 December 1980 (aged 74) New South Wales, Australia
- Party: Labor Party
- Spouse: Irene Jessie Holder (m. 1927)
- Children: Two daughters
- Education: Armidale High School
- Occupation: Public servant and shipping clerk

Thomas Irving Morey (6 February 1906 – 11 December 1980) was an Australian politician, elected from 1962 to 1965 as a member of the New South Wales Legislative Assembly, for the electoral district of Bligh. He was a member of the Labor Party.

== Notes ==
New South Wales Legislative Assembly
District created	Member for Bligh; 1962–1965	Succeeded by Morton Cohen
