= Sam Jones (Australian politician) =

Australian politician

- Born: Samuel Barry Jones; 8 July 1923; Newcastle, New South Wales
- Died: 26 January 1999 (aged 75); Waratah, New South Wales
- Citizenship: Australian
- Education: Newcastle Boys High School
- Occupations: fitter, politician

Samuel Barry Jones (8 July 1923 – 26 January 1999) was an Australian politician. He was a member of the New South Wales Legislative Assembly from 1965 until 1984 and also a member of the ALP.

== Early life ==
Samuel Barry Jones was born in Newcastle. He was the son of a steelworker and a brother of Charlie Jones. He was educated to intermediate level at Newcastle Boys' High School and trained as a fitter and turner. He was an office-holder in the Amalgamated Engineering Union.

== Political career ==
Sam Jones joined the Labor Party in 1945 and served as vice president and secretary of the Tighes Hill branch, vice president of Newcastle and Waratah State Electorate Councils and secretary of Newcastle Federal Electorate Council.

Jones was elected to Newcastle City Council in 1959 and served as an Alderman until 1965. He was a member of the Shortland County Council (1961) and the Hunter District Water Board.

Jones defeated Frank Purdue the incumbent member for the seat of Waratah at the 1965 state election by 87 votes (0.79%). He retained the seat at the next 6 elections.

During debate in the Legislative Assembly in August 1979, the member for South Coast, Mr John Hatton accused Jones of being involved in the cover-up of a horse doping scandal. Jones vigorously denied the allegations and sued The Sydney Morning Herald for defamation over its reporting of the allegations. His action failed in the Supreme Court of New South Wales and Jones was left with a significant debt.

Jones lost ALP pre-selection for the seat prior to the general election of 1984. He ran as an independent candidate against John Price, the endorsed Labor candidate. He finished third in the election with 24% of the vote and was subsequently expelled from the ALP.

He was declared bankrupt in 1985.

Of his brother, Charlie Jones said:"He most certainly did have a very colourful career, but I think he would like to be remembered as the Labor man he was ... Sam was an aggressive man who fought hard for the underdog."

== Personal life ==
Sam Jones died in the Mater Hospital, Waratah to which he had been admitted after a stroke; he had earlier been treated for a brain tumour. A memorial ceremony was held at St Mark's Anglican Church, Islington.

On 30 September 1960, Jones married Patricia Jones. They had a three children. Jones was survived by Patricia and their daughter, Sandra Lea, and one of their sons, John William Jones.

New South Wales Legislative Assembly
Preceded by Frank Purdue	Member for Waratah; 1965–1984	Succeeded by John Price
