= Edward Greaves (Australian politician) =

Australian politician

Edward Greaves (25 August 1910 – 4 July 1964) was an Australian politician. He was a member of the New South Wales Legislative Assembly from 1962 until 1963. He was a member of the Labor Party.

Greaves was born in Durham, England and, as an infant, migrated to Australia with his family. He was educated to elementary level at Adamstown Public School and trained as a bricklayer. He was an office-holder in the Building Workers' Industrial Union.

He was an Alderman of Newcastle City Council from 1959 till 1962.

Greaves defeated Frank Purdue the incumbent member for the seat of Waratah at the state election of 3 March 1962 by 1,026 votes (2.7%). He died 2 years after his election and Purdue regained the seat at the subsequent by-election.

New South Wales Legislative Assembly
Preceded by Frank Purdue	Member for Waratah; 1962 – 1964	Succeeded by Frank Purdue
