= Tom Mead =

Australian politician and journalist

Thomas Francis Mead (4 May 1918 – 22 January 2004) was an Australian politician, elected as a member of the New South Wales Legislative Assembly representing the seat of Hurstville for the Liberal Party. He was also a political journalist.

== Early years ==
Mead was born in Randwick, New South Wales, the son of a horse trainer Robert George Mead and Lilian Margaret Ryan.

== Political career ==
Mead gained the seat of Hurstville in the New South Wales Legislative Assembly after the 1965 election winning it from the Labor Party representative, Bill Rigby. Mead retained the seat for four terms until the 1976 election at which time Kevin Ryan led the return to Labor.

== Journalism ==
Mead worked extensively as a journalist culminating with a position in the Federal Parliamentary Press Gallery for ten years. He worked as a special writer and music critic for The Daily Telegraph from 1952 until 1955 and became chief of staff from 1955 until 1961. Mead then moved into management role, working as managing editor of Suburban Publication Pty Limited from 1961 until 1965. From management he moved into owning and directing smaller Sydney newspapers, holding an interest in the St George Daily Leader and becoming director in 1968, and chairman of the Manly Daily in 1974. He wrote Killers of Eden (published 1961), the story of the killer whales which, for several generations, worked with humans, catching whales at Twofold Bay, NSW. He also wrote Manly ferries of Sydney Harbour : the seven mile ships (published 1994).

Mead died in the Sydney suburb of Manly, New South Wales.

New South Wales Legislative Assembly
Preceded by Bill Rigby	Member for Hurstville; 1965–1976	Succeeded by Kevin Ryan
