= Ron Dunbier =

Australian politician (1914–1984)

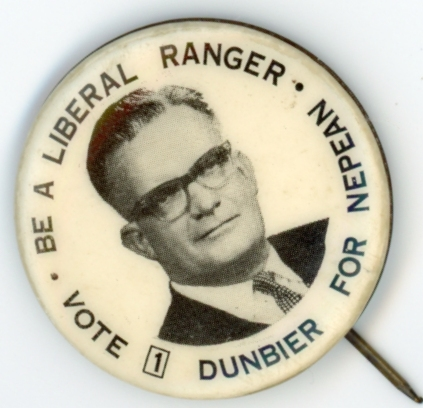
Election campaign button, 1968

Rowland Albert "Ron" Dunbier (29 August 1914 – 23 April 1984) was an Australian politician. He was the Liberal member for Nepean in the New South Wales Legislative Assembly from 1965 to 1971.

Dunbier was born in Campsie to Rowland Arthur Dunbier, a boot operator, and his wife Mary. He was educated at South Strathfield Public School and Ashfield Technical College before enlisting in the RAAF; he served in New Guinea. On his return he opened an iceworks in Liverpool and later worked as a motor dealer. In 1948 he was elected to Liverpool Council, resigning in 1953 but serving again from 1954 to 1962. He was mayor from 1949 to 1952, 1957 to 1959 and in 1962. On 21 October 1936 he married Violet; their son, Max Dunbier, was also a member of the New South Wales Legislative Assembly.

Dunbier had originally been a member of the Labor Party, but he defected to the Liberal Party in the 1950s. In 1965 he defeated Labor MP Alfred Bennett to win the seat of Nepean. He was re-elected in 1968, but lost his seat in 1971 to Labor's Ron Mulock. He was the Liberal candidate for the federal seat of Werriwa in 1972 but was unsuccessful; he subsequently returned to local politics, serving on Liverpool Council from 1974 to 1976. Dunbier died in Badgerys Creek in 1984.

New South Wales Legislative Assembly
Preceded by Alfred Bennett	Member for Nepean; 1965–1971	Succeeded by Ron Mulock
