= Frank Purdue =

Australian politician

Dr Frank Outen Jensen Purdue, CBE (2 September 1899 – 24 December 1985) was an Australian politician. He was a member of the New South Wales Legislative Assembly from 1956 until 1962 and again between 1964 and 1965. He was prominent in local Government and was Lord Mayor of Newcastle, NSW for 9 years between 1951 and 1965 and was instrumental in the establishment of the University of Newcastle. He was not aligned to a political party.

== Early life ==
Purdue was born in Murrumbeena, Victoria. He was the son of a building contractor and was educated to intermediate level at Armidale High School. His initial employment was with the New South Wales Railway Department as a clerk. He was transferred to Newcastle in 1922 and resigned from the department in 1955. Purdue was a Methodist lay preacher, Rotarian and Freemason. He walked with a profound limp due to childhood polio.

== Political career ==
Purdue was an Alderman of the City of Newcastle from 1944 to 1974 and Lord Mayor in 1951, 1953–55 and 1959–65. during this period he played an active role in the development of the University of Newcastle, Australia.

At the state election held on 3 March 1956 he stood as an independent candidate for the seat of Waratah. In a surprise result he defeated the endorsed Labor candidate Harry Sheedy. This result was at least in part due to the recent split of the Democratic Labor Party from Labor. Purdue successfully defended the seat at the election of 21 March 1959 but lost the seat to Edward Greaves, the ALP candidate at the election of 3 March 1962. Greaves died in 1964 and Purdue was successful in his attempt to regain the seat at a by-election. He was defeated at the election of 1 May 1965 by the new ALP candidate, Sam Jones.

Purdue was appointed a Commander of the Order of the British Empire in 1966 and was awarded the inaugural Freeman of the City of Newcastle in 1981.

He died at his home in Mayfield and was buried at Sandgate Cemetery after a Methodist ceremony.

The following places are named after Purdue:

- Purdue Park, Scholey Street, Mayfield
- Purdue Avenue, Mayfield West
- Purdue Room, University of Newcastle

Civic offices
Preceded by Harry Quinlan	Lord Mayor of Newcastle; 1951	Succeeded by Tom Armstrong
Preceded by Tom Armstrong	Lord Mayor of Newcastle; 1953–1955	Succeeded by Douglas McDougall
Preceded by Ernest Dunkley	Lord Mayor of Newcastle; 1960–1965	Succeeded by Douglas McDougall
New South Wales Legislative Assembly
Preceded by Robert Cameron	Member for Waratah; 1959–1962	Succeeded by Edward Greaves
Preceded by Edward Greaves	Member for Waratah; 1964–1965	Succeeded by Sam Jones
