= Morton Cohen (politician) =

Australian politician and cricketer

Morton Barnett Cohen (19 September 1913 – 14 January 1968) was an Australian politician, elected from 1965 to 1968 as a Liberal member of the New South Wales Legislative Assembly, for the electoral district of Bligh. Cohen attended Sydney Boys High School from 1926 to 1931. He played 10 first-class cricket matches for New South Wales and scored a century against Queensland in 1940.

== See also ==
- List of New South Wales representative cricketers

New South Wales Legislative Assembly
Preceded by Tom Morey	Member for Bligh; 1965–1968	Succeeded by John Barraclough
