= Electoral district of Nepean (New South Wales) =

Former state electoral district of New South Wales, Australia

Nepean was an electoral district of the Legislative Assembly in the Australian state of New South Wales, originally created in 1859, and named after the Nepean River. It was abolished in 1904 due to the re-distribution of electorates following the 1903 New South Wales referendum, which required the number of members of the Legislative Assembly to be reduced from 125 to 90. Nepean was recreated in 1927 and abolished again in 1981.

== Members for Nepean ==
First incarnation (1859–1904)
Member	Party	Term
Robert Jamison	None	1859–1860
James Ryan	None	1860–1872
Joseph Single	None	1872–1874
Patrick Shepherd	None	1874–1877
Thomas Smith	None	1877–1887
Samuel Lees	Free Trade	1887–1895
Thomas Smith	Protectionist	1895–1898
Samuel Lees	Free Trade	1898–1901
Thomas Smith	Progressive	1901–1904
Second incarnation (1927–1981)
Member	Party	Term
Joseph Jackson	Nationalist	1927–1931
Joseph Jackson	United Australia	1931–1944
Joseph Jackson	Independent	1944–1945
Joseph Jackson	Liberal	1945–1956
Bill Chapman	Liberal	1956–1962
Alfred Bennett	Labor	1962–1965
Ron Dunbier	Liberal	1965–1971
Ron Mulock	Labor	1971–1973
Ron Rofe	Liberal	1973–1978
Peter Anderson	Labor	1978–1981

== Election results ==
1978 New South Wales state election: Nepean
Party	Candidate	Votes	%	±%
Labor	Peter Anderson	20,720	56.1	+5.0
Liberal	Ron Rofe	14,466	39.2	−5.7
Democrats	Ronald Edwards	1,752	4.7	+4.7
Total formal votes		36,938	98.4	−0.3
Informal votes		602	1.6	+0.3
Turnout		37,540	93.6	+0.1
Two-party-preferred result
Labor	Peter Anderson	21,596	58.5	+10.8
Liberal	Ron Rofe	15,342	41.5	−10.8
Labor gain from Liberal		Swing	+10.8	
