= Electoral district of Waratah (New South Wales) =

Former state electoral district of New South Wales, Australia

Waratah was an electoral district of the Legislative Assembly in the Australian state of New South Wales in the Newcastle area, including the suburb of Waratah. It was originally created in 1894, when multi-member districts were abolished, and the three member district of Newcastle was divided between Waratah, Newcastle East, Newcastle West, Kahibah and Wickham. The district was abolished in 1913 and recreated in 1930, replacing parts of Kahibah and Wallsend. It was abolished again in 1999.

== Members for Waratah ==
First incarnation (1894–1913)
Member	Party	Term
Arthur Griffith	Labour	1894–1903
Matthew Charlton	Labour	1903–1904
John Estell	Labour	1904–1913
Second incarnation (1930–1999)
Member	Party	Term
Robert Cameron	Labor	1930–1956
Frank Purdue	Independent	1956–1962
Edward Greaves	Labor	1962–1964
Frank Purdue	Independent	1964–1965
Sam Jones	Labor	1965–1984
John Price	Labor	1984–1999

== Election results ==
1995 New South Wales state election: Waratah
Party	Candidate	Votes	%	±%
Labor	John Price	20,975	65.7	+0.6
Liberal	Wayne Shoobridge	7,222	22.6	−1.9
Greens	Liz Rene	3,743	11.7	+11.7
Total formal votes		31,940	93.6	+5.4
Informal votes		2,166	6.4	−5.4
Turnout		34,106	95.4	
Two-party-preferred result
Labor	John Price	22,801	74.1	+3.1
Liberal	Wayne Shoobridge	7,972	25.9	−3.1
Labor hold		Swing	+3.1	
