= Electoral results for the Division of Macarthur =

Australian division election results

This is a list of electoral results for the Division of Macarthur in Australian federal elections from the division's creation in 1949 until the present.

== Members ==
| Member | Party | Term |
|---|---|---|
| Jeff Bate | Liberal | 1949–1972 |
| Jeff Bate | Independent | 1972–1972 |
| John Kerin | Labor | 1972–1975 |
| Michael Baume | Liberal | 1975–1983 |
| Colin Hollis | Labor | 1983–1984 |
| Stephen Martin | Labor | 1984–1993 |
| Chris Haviland | Labor | 1993–1996 |
| John Fahey | Liberal | 1996–2001 |
| Pat Farmer | Liberal | 2001–2010 |
| Russell Matheson | Liberal | 2010–2016 |
| Mike Freelander | Labor | 2016–present |

== Election results ==
=== Elections in the 2020s ===
==== 2025 ====
2025 Australian federal election: Macarthur
| Party | Candidate | Votes | % | ±% |
|---|---|---|---|---|
| Greens | Frankie Scott | | | |
| Fusion | Edward Palmer | | | |
| Labor | Mike Freelander | | | |
| Libertarian | Connie Harvey | | | |
| One Nation | Gregory Grogan | | | |
| Liberal | Binod Paudel | | | |
| Family First | Graham Ernest Charlesworth | | | |
| Total formal votes | | | | |
| Informal votes | | | | |
| Turnout | | | | |

==== 2022 ====
2022 Australian federal election: Macarthur
| Party | Candidate | Votes | % | ±% |
|---|---|---|---|---|
| Labor | Mike Freelander | 51,001 | 45.89 | −1.89 |
| Liberal | Binod Paudel | 33,867 | 30.48 | −0.37 |
| One Nation | Adam Zahra | 8,876 | 7.99 | −0.61 |
| Greens | Jayden Rivera | 8,584 | 7.72 | +3.30 |
| United Australia | Rosa Sicari | 6,602 | 5.94 | +3.42 |
| Liberal Democrats | Scott Korman | 2,197 | 1.98 | +1.98 |
| Total formal votes | | 111,127 | 92.78 | +1.63 |
| Informal votes | | 8,646 | 7.22 | −1.63 |
| Turnout | | 119,773 | 89.78 | −1.88 |
Two-party-preferred result
| Labor | Mike Freelander | 65,039 | 58.53 | +0.13 |
| Liberal | Binod Paudel | 46,088 | 41.47 | −0.13 |
| Labor hold | | Swing | +0.13 | |

Alluvial diagram for preference flows in the seat of Macarthur in the 2022 federal election. indicates at what stage the winning candidate had over 50% of the votes and was declared the winner.

=== Elections in the 2010s ===
==== 2019 ====
2019 Australian federal election: Macarthur
| Party | Candidate | Votes | % | ±% |
|---|---|---|---|---|
| Labor | Mike Freelander | 47,539 | 47.78 | −4.10 |
| Liberal | Riley Munro | 30,696 | 30.85 | −5.00 |
| One Nation | Shane Norman | 8,555 | 8.60 | +8.60 |
| Greens | Jayden Rivera | 4,397 | 4.42 | +0.15 |
| Christian Democrats | James Gent | 3,705 | 3.72 | −0.59 |
| United Australia | Nathan Murphy | 2,506 | 2.52 | +2.52 |
| Animal Justice | Matt Stellino | 2,106 | 2.12 | +2.12 |
| Total formal votes | | 99,504 | 91.15 | −2.23 |
| Informal votes | | 9,663 | 8.85 | +2.23 |
| Turnout | | 109,167 | 91.66 | −0.17 |
Two-party-preferred result
| Labor | Mike Freelander | 58,110 | 58.40 | +0.07 |
| Liberal | Riley Munro | 41,394 | 41.60 | −0.07 |
| Labor hold | | Swing | +0.07 | |

==== 2016 ====
2016 Australian federal election: Macarthur
| Party | Candidate | Votes | % | ±% |
|---|---|---|---|---|
| Labor | Mike Freelander | 46,650 | 51.88 | +13.68 |
| Liberal | Russell Matheson | 32,235 | 35.85 | −9.81 |
| Christian Democrats | James Gent | 3,875 | 4.31 | +1.20 |
| Greens | Ben Moroney | 3,836 | 4.27 | +0.10 |
| Xenophon | Richard Bakoss | 3,316 | 3.69 | +3.69 |
| Total formal votes | | 89,912 | 93.38 | +2.95 |
| Informal votes | | 6,379 | 6.62 | −2.95 |
| Turnout | | 96,291 | 91.83 | +2.23 |
Two-party-preferred result
| Labor | Mike Freelander | 52,448 | 58.33 | +11.72 |
| Liberal | Russell Matheson | 37,464 | 41.67 | −11.72 |
| Labor gain from Liberal | | Swing | +11.72 | |

==== 2013 ====
2013 Australian federal election: Macarthur
| Party | Candidate | Votes | % | ±% |
|---|---|---|---|---|
| Liberal | Russell Matheson | 46,185 | 54.33 | +6.93 |
| Labor | Ian Fulton | 26,039 | 30.63 | −7.92 |
| Palmer United | Goetz Grosche | 4,916 | 5.78 | +5.78 |
| Greens | Patrick Darley-Jones | 3,929 | 4.62 | −0.94 |
| Christian Democrats | Sarah Ramsay | 2,189 | 2.58 | +0.82 |
| Katter's Australian | Mick Williams | 1,751 | 2.06 | +2.06 |
| Total formal votes | | 85,009 | 92.17 | +0.28 |
| Informal votes | | 7,225 | 7.83 | −0.28 |
| Turnout | | 92,234 | 94.15 | −0.37 |
Two-party-preferred result
| Liberal | Russell Matheson | 52,161 | 61.36 | +8.34 |
| Labor | Ian Fulton | 32,848 | 38.64 | −8.34 |
| Liberal hold | | Swing | +8.34 | |

==== 2010 ====
2010 Australian federal election: Macarthur
| Party | Candidate | Votes | % | ±% |
|---|---|---|---|---|
| Liberal | Russell Matheson | 37,069 | 47.40 | +1.79 |
| Labor | Nick Bleasdale | 30,151 | 38.55 | −6.86 |
| Greens | Jessica Di Blasio | 4,347 | 5.56 | +1.29 |
| One Nation | Kate McCulloch | 2,338 | 2.99 | +2.99 |
| Family First | Grant Herbert | 1,757 | 2.25 | +0.57 |
| Christian Democrats | Nolene Norsworthy | 1,377 | 1.75 | −0.15 |
| Democrats | Clinton Mead | 652 | 0.83 | +0.14 |
| Building Australia | Domenic Cammareri | 512 | 0.65 | +0.65 |
| Total formal votes | | 78,203 | 91.89 | −2.54 |
| Informal votes | | 6,899 | 8.11 | +2.54 |
| Turnout | | 85,102 | 94.50 | −0.46 |
Two-party-preferred result
| Liberal | Russell Matheson | 41,462 | 53.02 | +3.53 |
| Labor | Nick Bleasdale | 36,741 | 46.98 | −3.53 |
| Liberal notional gain from Labor | | Swing | +3.53 | |

=== Elections in the 2000s ===
==== 2007 ====
2007 Australian federal election: Macarthur
| Party | Candidate | Votes | % | ±% |
|---|---|---|---|---|
| Liberal | Pat Farmer | 35,996 | 46.98 | −8.79 |
| Labor | Nick Bleasdale | 33,688 | 43.97 | +12.55 |
| Greens | Ben Raue | 3,334 | 4.35 | −0.52 |
| Christian Democrats | Godwin Goh | 1,357 | 1.77 | −0.77 |
| Family First | Douglas Rauch | 1,323 | 1.73 | −0.19 |
| Democrats | Samantha Elliott-Halls | 618 | 0.81 | −0.12 |
| Non-Custodial Parents | Andy Thompson | 306 | 0.40 | +0.40 |
| Total formal votes | | 76,622 | 94.63 | +1.50 |
| Informal votes | | 4,347 | 5.37 | −1.50 |
| Turnout | | 80,969 | 95.66 | +1.24 |
Two-party-preferred result
| Liberal | Pat Farmer | 38,865 | 50.72 | −10.43 |
| Labor | Nick Bleasdale | 37,757 | 49.28 | +10.43 |
| Liberal hold | | Swing | −10.43 | |

==== 2004 ====
2004 Australian federal election: Macarthur
| Party | Candidate | Votes | % | ±% |
|---|---|---|---|---|
| Liberal | Pat Farmer | 40,469 | 54.47 | +3.68 |
| Labor | Meg Oates | 24,584 | 33.09 | −2.79 |
| Greens | Jennifer Hanson | 3,324 | 4.47 | +1.42 |
| Family First | Mick Agius | 1,735 | 2.34 | +2.34 |
| Christian Democrats | Ralph Dunkerley | 1,730 | 2.33 | +0.86 |
| One Nation | Len Watkins | 1,266 | 1.70 | −3.55 |
| Democrats | Lester Pearce | 625 | 0.84 | −1.33 |
| Independent | Max Brazenall | 558 | 0.75 | +0.75 |
| Total formal votes | | 74,291 | 92.63 | −1.44 |
| Informal votes | | 5,907 | 7.37 | +1.44 |
| Turnout | | 80,198 | 95.15 | +0.21 |
Two-party-preferred result
| Liberal | Pat Farmer | 44,209 | 59.51 | +2.55 |
| Labor | Meg Oates | 30,082 | 40.49 | −2.55 |
| Liberal hold | | Swing | +2.55 | |

==== 2001 ====
2001 Australian federal election: Macarthur
| Party | Candidate | Votes | % | ±% |
|---|---|---|---|---|
| Liberal | Pat Farmer | 36,348 | 50.79 | +10.67 |
| Labor | Meg Oates | 25,675 | 35.88 | −4.91 |
| One Nation | Len Watkins | 3,759 | 5.25 | −5.75 |
| Greens | Geraldine Hunt | 2,183 | 3.05 | +0.23 |
| Democrats | Jasmine Lantry | 1,555 | 2.17 | −1.97 |
| Christian Democrats | Elwyn Sheppard | 1,052 | 1.47 | +1.47 |
| Independent | Gregory John Knowles | 757 | 1.06 | +1.06 |
| Non-Custodial Parents | Eric Sanders | 236 | 0.33 | +0.33 |
| Total formal votes | | 71,565 | 94.07 | −2.05 |
| Informal votes | | 4,508 | 5.93 | +2.05 |
| Turnout | | 76,073 | 95.52 | |
Two-party-preferred result
| Liberal | Pat Farmer | 40,767 | 56.96 | +8.65 |
| Labor | Meg Oates | 30,798 | 43.04 | −8.65 |
| Liberal notional gain from Labor | | Swing | +8.65 | |

=== Elections in the 1990s ===
==== 1998 ====
1998 Australian federal election: Macarthur
| Party | Candidate | Votes | % | ±% |
|---|---|---|---|---|
| Liberal | John Fahey | 40,395 | 47.75 | −5.62 |
| Labor | Michael Banasik | 28,495 | 33.69 | +1.67 |
| One Nation | Damian Alm | 9,246 | 10.93 | +10.93 |
| Democrats | Anthony Kaufmann | 3,761 | 4.45 | −0.39 |
| Greens | Michelle Wood | 2,692 | 3.18 | +0.40 |
| Total formal votes | | 84,589 | 96.60 | +0.12 |
| Informal votes | | 2,973 | 3.40 | −0.12 |
| Turnout | | 87,562 | 95.49 | −1.25 |
Two-party-preferred result
| Liberal | John Fahey | 47,060 | 55.63 | −5.06 |
| Labor | Michael Banasik | 37,529 | 44.37 | +5.06 |
| Liberal hold | | Swing | −5.06 | |

==== 1996 ====
1996 Australian federal election: Macarthur
| Party | Candidate | Votes | % | ±% |
|---|---|---|---|---|
| Liberal | John Fahey | 40,963 | 53.38 | +8.82 |
| Labor | Noel Lowry | 24,570 | 32.02 | −14.50 |
| Democrats | Peter Fraser | 3,714 | 4.84 | +4.84 |
| Independent | Herb Bethune | 2,563 | 3.34 | −1.98 |
| Greens | Vicki Kearney | 2,132 | 2.78 | +2.78 |
| Against Further Immigration | Janet Watkins | 2,090 | 2.72 | +2.72 |
| Independent | Colleen Street | 435 | 0.57 | +0.57 |
| Independent | Stephen Agius | 275 | 0.36 | +0.36 |
| Total formal votes | | 76,742 | 96.48 | −0.64 |
| Informal votes | | 2,799 | 3.52 | +0.64 |
| Turnout | | 79,541 | 96.73 | +0.60 |
Two-party-preferred result
| Liberal | John Fahey | 46,372 | 60.69 | +11.97 |
| Labor | Noel Lowry | 30,034 | 39.31 | −11.97 |
| Liberal gain from Labor | | Swing | +11.97 | |

==== 1993 ====
1993 Australian federal election: Macarthur
| Party | Candidate | Votes | % | ±% |
|---|---|---|---|---|
| Labor | Chris Haviland | 31,990 | 46.51 | +5.87 |
| Liberal | Ron Forrester | 30,647 | 44.56 | +4.40 |
| Independent | Herb Bethune | 3,660 | 5.32 | +5.32 |
| Independent | Peter Gadsby | 2,478 | 3.60 | +3.60 |
| Total formal votes | | 68,775 | 97.12 | +0.20 |
| Informal votes | | 2,038 | 2.88 | −0.20 |
| Turnout | | 70,813 | 96.13 | |
Two-party-preferred result
| Labor | Chris Haviland | 35,258 | 51.28 | −1.33 |
| Liberal | Ron Forrester | 33,496 | 48.72 | +1.33 |
| Labor hold | | Swing | −1.33 | |

==== 1990 ====
1990 Australian federal election: Macarthur
| Party | Candidate | Votes | % | ±% |
|---|---|---|---|---|
| Labor | Stephen Martin | 32,562 | 49.8 | −3.9 |
| Liberal | Jim Cameron | 20,460 | 31.3 | −5.3 |
| Democrats | Peter Feltis | 8,533 | 13.1 | +3.4 |
| Australian Gruen | Chris Illert | 1,751 | 2.7 | +2.7 |
| Call to Australia | Ken McDonald | 1,403 | 2.1 | +2.1 |
| Socialist | Leon Bringolf | 651 | 1.0 | +1.0 |
| Total formal votes | | 65,360 | 97.0 | |
| Informal votes | | 2,003 | 3.0 | |
| Turnout | | 67,363 | 95.5 | |
Two-party-preferred result
| Labor | Stephen Martin | 40,861 | 62.7 | +3.8 |
| Liberal | Jim Cameron | 24,352 | 37.3 | −3.8 |
| Labor hold | | Swing | +3.8 | |

=== Elections in the 1980s ===
==== 1987 ====
1987 Australian federal election: Macarthur
| Party | Candidate | Votes | % | ±% |
|---|---|---|---|---|
| Labor | Stephen Martin | 32,404 | 53.7 | −1.8 |
| Liberal | Ron Forrester | 22,106 | 36.6 | +3.6 |
| Democrats | Meg Sampson | 5,862 | 9.7 | −1.8 |
| Total formal votes | | 60,372 | 95.1 | |
| Informal votes | | 3,085 | 4.9 | |
| Turnout | | 63,457 | 94.2 | |
Two-party-preferred result
| Labor | Stephen Martin | 35,558 | 58.9 | −3.4 |
| Liberal | Ron Forrester | 24,814 | 41.1 | +3.4 |
| Labor hold | | Swing | −3.4 | |

==== 1984 ====
1984 Australian federal election: Macarthur
| Party | Candidate | Votes | % | ±% |
|---|---|---|---|---|
| Labor | Stephen Martin | 31,100 | 55.5 | −4.8 |
| Liberal | Mark Stanham | 18,521 | 33.0 | −1.7 |
| Democrats | Meg Sampson | 6,421 | 11.5 | +7.1 |
| Total formal votes | | 56,042 | 93.2 | |
| Informal votes | | 4,079 | 6.8 | |
| Turnout | | 60,121 | 95.1 | |
Two-party-preferred result
| Labor | Stephen Martin | 34,920 | 62.3 | −0.6 |
| Liberal | Mark Stanham | 21,115 | 37.7 | +0.6 |
| Labor hold | | Swing | −0.6 | |

==== 1983 ====
1983 Australian federal election: Macarthur
| Party | Candidate | Votes | % | ±% |
|---|---|---|---|---|
| Labor | Colin Hollis | 39,904 | 49.5 | +5.5 |
| Liberal | Michael Baume | 36,725 | 45.5 | −5.7 |
| Democrats | Frederic Goodfellow | 3,515 | 4.4 | +0.2 |
| Independent | Martin Essenberg | 510 | 0.6 | +0.6 |
| Total formal votes | | 80,654 | 98.5 | |
| Informal votes | | 1,195 | 1.5 | |
| Turnout | | 81,849 | 95.4 | |
Two-party-preferred result
| Labor | Colin Hollis | 42,041 | 52.1 | +5.3 |
| Liberal | Michael Baume | 38,613 | 47.9 | −5.3 |
| Labor gain from Liberal | | Swing | +5.3 | |

==== 1980 ====
1980 Australian federal election: Macarthur
| Party | Candidate | Votes | % | ±% |
|---|---|---|---|---|
| Liberal | Michael Baume | 37,786 | 51.2 | +2.8 |
| Labor | Jim Groves | 32,417 | 44.0 | −0.6 |
| Democrats | Warren Steele | 3,081 | 4.2 | −1.9 |
| Independent | Ronald Sarina | 470 | 0.6 | +0.6 |
| Total formal votes | | 73,754 | 98.2 | |
| Informal votes | | 1,317 | 1.8 | |
| Turnout | | 75,071 | 94.9 | |
Two-party-preferred result
| Liberal | Michael Baume | | 53.2 | +1.3 |
| Labor | Jim Groves | | 46.8 | −1.3 |
| Liberal hold | | Swing | +1.3 | |

=== Elections in the 1970s ===
==== 1977 ====
1977 Australian federal election: Macarthur
| Party | Candidate | Votes | % | ±% |
|---|---|---|---|---|
| Liberal | Michael Baume | 32,209 | 48.4 | −2.9 |
| Labor | John Kerin | 29,686 | 44.6 | −0.4 |
| Democrats | William Speirs | 4,034 | 6.1 | +6.1 |
| Progress | Victor Thomas | 603 | 0.9 | −1.8 |
| Total formal votes | | 66,532 | 98.5 | |
| Informal votes | | 1,012 | 1.5 | |
| Turnout | | 67,544 | 96.3 | |
Two-party-preferred result
| Liberal | Michael Baume | 34,557 | 51.9 | −2.2 |
| Labor | John Kerin | 31,975 | 48.1 | +2.2 |
| Liberal hold | | Swing | −2.2 | |

==== 1975 ====
1975 Australian federal election: Macarthur
| Party | Candidate | Votes | % | ±% |
|---|---|---|---|---|
| Liberal | Michael Baume | 41,341 | 51.3 | +6.4 |
| Labor | John Kerin | 36,247 | 45.0 | −8.2 |
| Workers | Ramon Barros | 2,213 | 2.7 | +2.7 |
| Australia | Susan Healy | 557 | 0.7 | −1.3 |
| Independent | Barry Watkinson | 280 | 0.3 | +0.3 |
| Total formal votes | | 80,638 | 98.2 | |
| Informal votes | | 1,463 | 1.8 | |
| Turnout | | 82,101 | 95.9 | |
Two-party-preferred result
| Liberal | Michael Baume | | 54.1 | +8.5 |
| Labor | John Kerin | | 45.9 | −8.5 |
| Liberal gain from Labor | | Swing | +8.5 | |

==== 1974 ====
1974 Australian federal election: Macarthur
| Party | Candidate | Votes | % | ±% |
|---|---|---|---|---|
| Labor | John Kerin | 39,306 | 53.2 | +4.9 |
| Liberal | David Wood | 33,141 | 44.9 | +16.0 |
| Australia | Jill Kerr | 1,442 | 2.0 | +2.0 |
| Total formal votes | | 73,889 | 98.9 | |
| Informal votes | | 856 | 1.1 | |
| Turnout | | 74,745 | 95.9 | |
Two-party-preferred result
| Labor | John Kerin | | 54.4 | +2.2 |
| Liberal | David Wood | | 45.6 | −2.2 |
| Labor hold | | Swing | +2.2 | |

==== 1972 ====
1972 Australian federal election: Macarthur
| Party | Candidate | Votes | % | ±% |
|---|---|---|---|---|
| Labor | John Kerin | 30,257 | 48.3 | +5.9 |
| Liberal | Max Dunbier | 18,118 | 28.9 | −22.1 |
| Independent | Jeff Bate | 11,322 | 18.1 | +18.1 |
| Independent | Dianne Allen | 1,706 | 2.7 | +2.7 |
| Democratic Labor | Edwardus Himmelreich | 1,101 | 1.8 | +1.8 |
| Independent | Stephen Quilkey | 123 | 0.2 | +0.2 |
| Total formal votes | | 62,627 | 97.9 | |
| Informal votes | | 1,325 | 2.1 | |
| Turnout | | 63,952 | 96.3 | |
Two-party-preferred result
| Labor | John Kerin | 32,706 | 52.2 | +6.0 |
| Liberal | Max Dunbier | 29,921 | 47.8 | −6.0 |
| Labor gain from Liberal | | Swing | +6.0 | |

=== Elections in the 1960s ===
==== 1969 ====
1969 Australian federal election: Macarthur
| Party | Candidate | Votes | % | ±% |
|---|---|---|---|---|
| Liberal | Jeff Bate | 25,742 | 51.0 | −13.0 |
| Labor | Bob Whan | 21,434 | 42.4 | +10.0 |
| Australia | Brian Wyer | 2,422 | 4.8 | +4.8 |
| Pensioner Power | Sidney Sheedy | 917 | 1.8 | +1.8 |
| Total formal votes | | 50,515 | 98.5 | |
| Informal votes | | 761 | 1.5 | |
| Turnout | | 51,276 | 95.3 | |
Two-party-preferred result
| Liberal | Jeff Bate | | 53.8 | −12.6 |
| Labor | Bob Whan | | 46.2 | +12.6 |
| Liberal hold | | Swing | −12.6 | |

==== 1966 ====
1966 Australian federal election: Macarthur
| Party | Candidate | Votes | % | ±% |
|---|---|---|---|---|
| Liberal | Jeff Bate | 39,004 | 60.9 | +6.3 |
| Labor | Patrick O'Halloran | 22,753 | 35.5 | −5.9 |
| Democratic Labor | Albert Perish | 1,270 | 2.0 | −1.5 |
| Independent | Ronald Sarina | 510 | 0.8 | +0.3 |
| Independent | John Souter | 484 | 0.8 | +0.8 |
| Total formal votes | | 64,021 | 97.0 | |
| Informal votes | | 1,989 | 3.0 | |
| Turnout | | 66,010 | 94.4 | |
Two-party-preferred result
| Liberal | Jeff Bate | | 63.3 | +5.6 |
| Labor | Patrick O'Halloran | | 36.7 | −5.6 |
| Liberal hold | | Swing | +5.6 | |

==== 1963 ====
1963 Australian federal election: Macarthur
| Party | Candidate | Votes | % | ±% |
|---|---|---|---|---|
| Liberal | Jeff Bate | 31,720 | 54.6 | +1.6 |
| Labor | Don Nilon | 24,021 | 41.4 | −5.6 |
| Democratic Labor | Albert Perish | 309 | 3.5 | +3.5 |
| Independent | Ronald Sarina | 309 | 0.5 | +0.5 |
| Total formal votes | | 58,071 | 98.7 | |
| Informal votes | | 749 | 1.3 | |
| Turnout | | 58,820 | 95.3 | |
Two-party-preferred result
| Liberal | Jeff Bate | | 57.7 | +4.7 |
| Labor | Don Nilon | | 42.3 | −4.7 |
| Liberal hold | | Swing | +4.7 | |

==== 1961 ====
1961 Australian federal election: Macarthur
| Party | Candidate | Votes | % | ±% |
|---|---|---|---|---|
| Liberal | Jeff Bate | 27,532 | 53.0 | −6.3 |
| Labor | Don Nilon | 24,383 | 47.0 | +6.3 |
| Total formal votes | | 51,915 | 98.1 | |
| Informal votes | | 985 | 1.9 | |
| Turnout | | 52,900 | 95.1 | |
| Liberal hold | | Swing | −6.3 | |

=== Elections in the 1950s ===
==== 1958 ====
1958 Australian federal election: Macarthur
| Party | Candidate | Votes | % | ±% |
|---|---|---|---|---|
| Liberal | Jeff Bate | 26,002 | 59.3 | +1.3 |
| Labor | Eric Ryan | 17,861 | 40.7 | −1.3 |
| Total formal votes | | 43,863 | 97.9 | |
| Informal votes | | 936 | 2.1 | |
| Turnout | | 44,799 | 94.5 | |
| Liberal hold | | Swing | +1.3 | |

==== 1955 ====
1955 Australian federal election: Macarthur
| Party | Candidate | Votes | % | ±% |
|---|---|---|---|---|
| Liberal | Jeff Bate | 23,127 | 58.0 | +2.6 |
| Labor | Claude Allen | 16,756 | 42.0 | −2.0 |
| Total formal votes | | 39,883 | 97.4 | |
| Informal votes | | 1,021 | 2.6 | |
| Turnout | | 40,904 | 95.1 | |
| Liberal hold | | Swing | +2.4 | |

==== 1954 ====
1954 Australian federal election: Macarthur
| Party | Candidate | Votes | % | ±% |
|---|---|---|---|---|
| Liberal | Jeff Bate | 25,297 | 57.6 | −6.2 |
| Labor | Claude Allen | 18,643 | 42.4 | +6.2 |
| Total formal votes | | 43,940 | 98.8 | |
| Informal votes | | 517 | 1.2 | |
| Turnout | | 44,457 | 96.2 | |
| Liberal hold | | Swing | −6.2 | |

==== 1951 ====
1951 Australian federal election: Macarthur
| Party | Candidate | Votes | % | ±% |
|---|---|---|---|---|
| Liberal | Jeff Bate | 25,835 | 63.8 | −0.8 |
| Labor | William McDonnell | 14,633 | 36.2 | +0.8 |
| Total formal votes | | 40,468 | 98.5 | |
| Informal votes | | 622 | 1.5 | |
| Turnout | | 41,090 | 96.0 | |
| Liberal hold | | Swing | −0.8 | |

=== Elections in the 1940s ===
==== 1949 ====
1949 Australian federal election: Macarthur
| Party | Candidate | Votes | % | ±% |
|---|---|---|---|---|
| Liberal | Jeff Bate | 25,184 | 64.6 | +16.6 |
| Labor | William McDonnell | 13,776 | 35.4 | −9.1 |
| Total formal votes | | 38,960 | 98.3 | |
| Informal votes | | 689 | 1.7 | |
| Turnout | | 39,649 | 95.9 | |
| Liberal notional hold | | Swing | +12.2 | |
