= Results of the 1993 Australian federal election in New South Wales =

1993 Australian federal election (New South Wales)
- 13 March 1993

All 50 New South Wales seats in the Australian House of Representatives and 6 seats in the Australian Senate

	First party	Second party
Leader	Paul Keating	John Hewson
Party	Labor	Liberal/National coalition
Last election	30 seats	20 seats
Seats won	33 seats	16 seats
Seat change	▲3	▼4
Popular vote	1,714,512	1,473,482
Percentage	48.3%	41.6%
Swing	▲7.1	▲1.2
TPP	54.68%	45.32%
TPP swing	▲2.74	▼2.74

This is a list of electoral division results for the Australian 1993 federal election in the state of New South Wales.

== Overall results ==
Turnout 96.0% (CV) — Informal 3.1%
Party	Votes	%	Swing	Seats	Change
Liberal	1,127,291	31.80	-0.96	8	▼4
National	346,191	9.76	-0.77	8	Steady
Liberal/National Coalition	1,473,482	41.56	-1.73	16	▼4
Labor	1,714,502	48.36	+7.20	33	▲3
Independents	134,344	3.79	-1.40	1	Steady
Democrats	100,539	2.84	-7.37		
Greens (Note: The Australian Greens were founded in 1992, but in New South Wales not all local groups immediately affiliated to the new federal party. The Greens total in New South Wales includes the local groups for Lowe, Page, Reid, Robertson and Wentworth.)	50,052	1.41	+0.04		
Natural Law	23,385	0.66			
Call to Australia	21,764	0.61	-0.04		
Independent EFF	9,402	0.27			
Confederate Action	8,524	0.24			
Rex Connor Labor	7,083	0.20	-0.05		
AAFI	1,732	0.05			
Citizens Electoral Council	0,439	0.01			
Total	3,354,671			50	▼1
Two-party-preferred vote
Labor	1,898,256	54.68	+2.74		▲3
Liberal/National Coalition	1,573,030	45.32	–2.74		▼4
Invalid/blank votes	113,664	3.1			
Turnout	3,662,142	96.0			
Registered voters	3,814,932				
Source: Federal Elections 1993

== Results by division ==
=== Banks ===
This section is an excerpt from Electoral results for the Division of Banks § 1993

1993 Australian federal election: Banks
Party	Candidate	Votes	%	±%
Labor	Daryl Melham	40,460	54.80	+6.45
Liberal	Clive Taylor	25,634	34.72	−0.61
Democrats	Peter Farleigh	2,642	3.58	−7.96
Independent	Deborah Kirkman	2,522	3.42	+3.42
Call to Australia	Paul Davaris	1,726	2.34	+0.23
Independent	John Hay	846	1.15	+0.24
Total formal votes		73,830	96.61	+0.16
Informal votes		2,593	3.39	−0.16
Turnout		76.423	96.44	
Two-party-preferred result
Labor	Daryl Melham	44,675	60.54	+2.91
Liberal	Clive Taylor	29,117	39.46	−2.91
Labor hold		Swing	+2.91	

=== Barton ===
This section is an excerpt from Electoral results for the Division of Barton § 1993

1993 Australian federal election: Barton
Party	Candidate	Votes	%	±%
Labor	Gary Punch	41,442	55.92	+9.17
Liberal	Phil White	28,066	37.87	−1.99
Democrats	Troy Anderson	1,862	2.51	−5.24
Call to Australia	Cathy Mudie	1,118	1.51	+0.39
Independent	Norm McGarry	545	0.74	+0.74
Independent	Ross Green	425	0.57	+0.57
Independent	Paul Balding	365	0.49	+0.49
Natural Law	Dafna O'Neill	285	0.38	+0.38
Total formal votes		74,108	95.96	−0.19
Informal votes		3,118	4.04	+0.19
Turnout		77,226	96.31	
Two-party-preferred result
Labor	Gary Punch	43,994	59.39	+4.57
Liberal	Phil White	30,077	40.61	−4.57
Labor hold		Swing	+4.57	

=== Bennelong ===
This section is an excerpt from Electoral results for the Division of Bennelong § 1993

1993 Australian federal election: Bennelong
Party	Candidate	Votes	%	±%
Liberal	John Howard	37,096	50.12	+1.25
Labor	Monique Rotik	30,826	41.65	+9.28
Democrats	Suzanne Reddy	3,910	5.28	−4.98
Independent	John Dawson	1,222	1.65	+1.25
	Geoff Dalgliesh	570	0.77	+0.77
Natural Law	Michael Roylance	393	0.53	+0.53
Total formal votes		74,017	97.22	+0.32
Informal votes		2,118	2.78	−0.32
Turnout		76,135	96.33	
Two-party-preferred result
Liberal	John Howard	39,341	53.19	−3.96
Labor	Monique Rotik	34,629	46.81	+3.96
Liberal hold		Swing	−3.96	

=== Berowra ===
This section is an excerpt from Electoral results for the Division of Berowra § 1993

1993 Australian federal election: Berowra
Party	Candidate	Votes	%	±%
Liberal	Philip Ruddock	41,230	55.22	+3.44
Labor	Sue Deane	21,492	28.78	+3.19
Independent	Mick Gallagher	10,828	14.50	+12.15
Natural Law	Timothy Carr	1,116	1.49	+1.49
Total formal votes		74,666	97.45	−0.32
Informal votes		1,954	2.55	+0.32
Turnout		76,620	96.33	
Two-party-preferred result
Liberal	Philip Ruddock	46,433	62.20	−0.05
Labor	Sue Deane	28,216	37.80	+0.05
Liberal hold		Swing	−0.05	

=== Blaxland ===
This section is an excerpt from Electoral results for the Division of Blaxland § 1993

1993 Australian federal election: Blaxland
Party	Candidate	Votes	%	±%
Labor	Paul Keating	48,446	69.40	+13.88
Liberal	Les Osmond	16,927	24.25	−6.40
Democrats	Peter Hennessy	1,388	1.99	−6.43
Call to Australia	Trevor Carrick	804	1.15	+0.48
Independent	Jon Hillman	678	0.97	+0.97
	Linda Tenenbaum	413	0.59	+0.59
Independent	Bob Reid	388	0.56	+0.56
Natural Law	Peter O'Neill	378	0.54	+0.54
Independent	Marcus Aussie-Stone	204	0.29	+0.29
Independent	Wilfred Kelvin	179	0.26	+0.26
Total formal votes		69,805	94.97	+0.44
Informal votes		3,698	5.03	−0.44
Turnout		73,503	95.51	
Two-party-preferred result
Labor	Paul Keating	50,283	72.10	+9.10
Liberal	Les Osmond	19,461	27.90	−9.10
Labor hold		Swing	+9.10	

=== Bradfield ===
This section is an excerpt from Electoral results for the Division of Bradfield § 1993

1993 Australian federal election: Bradfield
Party	Candidate	Votes	%	±%
Liberal	David Connolly	51,822	69.77	+6.56
Labor	Simon Jeans	16,610	22.36	+6.08
Democrats	Bob Springett	4,665	6.28	−6.03
Natural Law	Mark Courtney-Holland	1,180	1.59	+1.59
Total formal votes		74,277	97.45	−0.53
Informal votes		1,943	2.55	+0.53
Turnout		76,220	96.25	
Two-party-preferred result
Liberal	David Connolly	54,247	73.04	+0.45
Labor	Simon Jeans	20,020	26.96	−0.45
Liberal hold		Swing	+0.45	

=== Calare ===
This section is an excerpt from Electoral results for the Division of Calare § 1993

1993 Australian federal election: Calare
Party	Candidate	Votes	%	±%
Labor	David Simmons	36,830	51.00	+6.54
National	Ron Penny	18,787	26.01	−0.53
Liberal	John Staal	13,376	18.52	+0.21
Independent	Brian Davis	2,097	2.90	+2.90
Independent	Robert Cianfranco	1,130	1.56	+1.56
Total formal votes		72,220	98.17	+0.38
Informal votes		1,350	1.83	−0.38
Turnout		73,570	96.93	
Two-party-preferred result
Labor	David Simmons	39,005	54.06	+2.58
National	Ron Penny	33,142	45.94	−2.58
Labor hold		Swing	+2.58	

=== Charlton ===
This section is an excerpt from Electoral results for the Division of Charlton § 1993

1993 Australian federal election: Charlton
Party	Candidate	Votes	%	±%
Labor	Bob Brown	44,680	60.90	+8.33
Liberal	Laurence Brewster	19,681	26.83	+6.18
Democrats	Lyn Godfrey	3,976	5.42	−7.97
Independent	John Baldwin	2,216	3.02	+3.02
Call to Australia	Mick Sandford	1,273	1.74	+1.74
Independent	Ryan Wilson	780	1.06	+1.06
Independent	Charles Sievers	516	0.70	+0.70
Natural Law	Zdenek Kviz	239	0.33	+0.33
Total formal votes		73,361	96.77	−0.76
Informal votes		2,449	3.23	+0.76
Turnout		75,810	97.23	
Two-party-preferred result
Labor	Bob Brown	49,215	67.10	+2.09
Liberal	Laurence Brewster	24,127	32.90	−2.09
Labor hold		Swing	+2.09	

=== Chifley ===
This section is an excerpt from Electoral results for the Division of Chifley § 1993

1993 Australian federal election: Chifley
Party	Candidate	Votes	%	±%
Labor	Roger Price	47,123	68.06	+7.93
Liberal	Jennifer Mackenzie	14,335	20.71	−3.33
Independent EFF	Joe Bryant	4,656	6.73	+6.68
Independent	F Ivor	2,014	2.91	+2.80
Independent	Tom Kumar	622	0.90	+0.90
	Yabu Bilyana	484	0.70	+0.70
Total formal votes		69,234	95.24	−0.42
Informal votes		3,460	4.76	+0.42
Turnout		72,694	95.42	
Two-party-preferred result
Labor	Roger Price	50,214	72.57	+1.82
Liberal	Jennifer Mackenzie	18,976	27.43	−1.82
Labor hold		Swing	+1.82	

=== Cook ===
This section is an excerpt from Electoral results for the Division of Cook § 1993

1993 Australian federal election: Cook
Party	Candidate	Votes	%	±%
Liberal	Don Dobie	36,524	49.58	+0.11
Labor	Noreen Solomon	29,806	40.46	+5.87
Independent	Alex Elphinston	2,300	3.12	+3.12
Democrats	Terri Richardson	2,212	3.00	−6.94
Call to Australia	Warren Kinny	1,813	2.46	+2.46
Natural Law	Julie Atkinson	530	0.72	+0.72
Confederate Action	Tom Thompson	479	0.65	+0.65
Total formal votes		73,664	97.51	−0.18
Informal votes		1,882	2.49	+0.18
Turnout		75,546	96.79	
Two-party-preferred result
Liberal	Don Dobie	39,367	53.47	−2.95
Labor	Noreen Solomon	34,261	46.53	+2.95
Liberal hold		Swing	−2.95	

=== Cowper ===
This section is an excerpt from Electoral results for the Division of Cowper § 1993

1993 Australian federal election: Cowper
Party	Candidate	Votes	%	±%
National	Garry Nehl	32,772	48.05	+2.10
Labor	Paul Sekfy	26,670	39.10	+6.97
Greens	Jillian Cranny	3,191	4.68	+2.30
Democrats	Trevor Pike	2,448	3.59	−6.62
Confederate Action	Darrel Wallbridge	1,714	2.51	+2.51
Natural Law	Roy Forrester	968	1.42	+1.42
Citizens Electoral Council	Nigel Gleeson	439	0.64	+0.64
Total formal votes		68,202	97.83	−0.23
Informal votes		1,512	2.17	0.23
Turnout		69,714	95.82	
Two-party-preferred result
National	Garry Nehl	36,846	54.06	−1.50
Labor	Paul Sekfy	31,311	45.94	+1.50
National hold		Swing	−1.50	

=== Cunningham ===
This section is an excerpt from Electoral results for the Division of Cunningham § 1993

1993 Australian federal election: Cunningham
Party	Candidate	Votes	%	±%
Labor	Stephen Martin	41,011	58.59	+8.66
Liberal	Ralph Lynch	18,453	26.36	+1.70
Greens	Carole Medcalf	3,300	4.71	−0.64
Democrats	Daniela Reverberi	2,890	4.13	−9.62
Independent	Meg Sampson	1,923	2.76	+2.76
Call to Australia	Robert O'Neill	1,155	1.65	+1.58
Independent	Michael West	740	1.06	+1.06
Natural Law	Fred Misdom	510	0.73	+0.73
Total formal votes		79,991	96.66	−0.28
Informal votes		2,419	3.34	+0.28
Turnout		72,410	96.37	
Two-party-preferred result
Labor	Stephen Martin	47,485	67.91	+15.51
Liberal	Ralph Lynch	22,440	32.09	+32.09
Labor hold		Swing	+15.51	

=== Dobell ===
This section is an excerpt from Electoral results for the Division of Dobell § 1993

1993 Australian federal election: Dobell
Party	Candidate	Votes	%	±%
Labor	Michael Lee	36,795	53.41	+6.54
Liberal	Bob Baldwin	27,654	40.14	+5.39
Democrats	Brian Day	2,311	3.35	−6.75
Independent	Bob Hudson	2,131	3.09	+3.09
Total formal votes		68,891	97.94	+0.32
Informal votes		1,452	2.06	−0.32
Turnout		70,343	97.01	
Two-party-preferred result
Labor	Michael Lee	39,140	56.82	−0.57
Liberal	Bob Baldwin	29,746	43.18	+0.57
Labor hold		Swing	−0.57	

=== Eden-Monaro ===
This section is an excerpt from Electoral results for the Division of Eden-Monaro § 1993

1993 Australian federal election: Eden-Monaro
Party	Candidate	Votes	%	±%
Labor	Jim Snow	32,229	47.20	+5.40
Liberal	Rob de Fegely	25,929	37.98	+6.54
National	Tom Barry	5,040	7.38	−2.63
Democrats	Norm Sanders	3,934	5.76	+5.76
Independent	Greg Doyle	694	1.02	+1.02
Natural Law	Peter Fraser	453	0.66	+0.66
Total formal votes		68,279	97.54	−0.23
Informal votes		1,720	2.46	+0.23
Turnout		69,999	95.64	
Two-party-preferred result
Labor	Jim Snow	37,036	54.28	−0.07
Liberal	Rob de Fegely	31,199	45.72	+0.07
Labor hold		Swing	−0.07	

=== Farrer ===
This section is an excerpt from Electoral results for the Division of Farrer § 1993

1993 Australian federal election: Farrer
Party	Candidate	Votes	%	±%
National	Tim Fischer	45,447	65.44	−2.33
Labor	Bill Higgins	20,648	29.73	−2.49
Democrats	Ian McKenzie	3,354	4.83	+4.83
Total formal votes		69,449	97.22	−0.33
Informal votes		1,987	2.78	+0.33
Turnout		71,436	96.21	
Two-party-preferred result
National	Tim Fischer	46,829	67.43	−0.34
Labor	Bill Higgins	22,615	32.57	+0.34
National hold		Swing	−0.34	

=== Fowler ===
This section is an excerpt from Electoral results for the Division of Fowler § 1993

1993 Australian federal election: Fowler
Party	Candidate	Votes	%	±%
Labor	Ted Grace	47,794	68.81	+8.34
Liberal	Gloria Arora	14,525	20.91	−3.73
Independent	Mark Stevens	5,014	7.22	+7.22
	Greg Josling	1,295	1.86	+1.86
Natural Law	Nicholas Hyde	832	1.20	+1.20
Total formal votes		69,460	94.80	+2.12
Informal votes		3,811	5.20	−2.12
Turnout		73,271	94.95	
Two-party-preferred result
Labor	Ted Grace	49,979	72.00	+4.20
Liberal	Gloria Arora	19,436	28.00	−4.20
Labor hold		Swing	+4.20	

=== Gilmore ===
This section is an excerpt from Electoral results for the Division of Gilmore § 1993

1993 Australian federal election: Gilmore
Party	Candidate	Votes	%	±%
Labor	Peter Knott	28,559	42.69	+3.13
Liberal	Bill Eddy	27,932	41.76	+23.53
National	Max Atkins	3,380	5.05	−19.97
Greens	May Leatch	3,160	4.72	+4.10
Democrats	Greg Butler	2,312	3.46	−9.65
Independent	Jeff Stanborough	925	1.38	+1.38
Independent	Ruth Devenney	475	0.71	+0.71
Natural Law	Rosemary Keighley	151	0.23	+0.23
Total formal votes		66,894	97.83	+0.02
Informal votes		1,483	2.17	−0.02
Turnout		68,377	97.02	
Two-party-preferred result
Labor	Peter Knott	33,721	50.45	+1.24
Liberal	Bill Eddy	33,115	49.55	−1.24
Labor gain from National		Swing	+1.24	

=== Grayndler ===
This section is an excerpt from Electoral results for the Division of Grayndler § 1993

1993 Australian federal election: Grayndler
Party	Candidate	Votes	%	±%
Labor	Jeannette McHugh	45,605	63.06	+10.79
Liberal	Kevin Robinson	16,761	23.17	−1.09
Greens	Paul Fitzgerald	4,363	6.03	+6.03
Democrats	Peter Markham	2,012	2.78	−8.09
Independent	Jack Shanahan	1,395	1.93	+1.93
Call to Australia	Clay Wilson	625	0.86	−0.42
Independent	Marnie Kennedy	545	0.75	+0.75
Independent	Lee Pepper	535	0.74	+0.45
Natural Law	Peter Johnston	485	0.67	+0.67
Total formal votes		72,325	95.42	+1.28
Informal votes		3,468	4.58	−1.28
Turnout		75,793	93.69	
Two-party-preferred result
Labor	Jeannette McHugh	52,589	72.81	+5.34
Liberal	Kevin Robinson	19,638	27.19	−5.34
Labor hold		Swing	+5.34	

=== Greenway ===
This section is an excerpt from Electoral results for the Division of Greenway § 1993

1993 Australian federal election: Greenway
Party	Candidate	Votes	%	±%
Labor	Russ Gorman	41,115	58.83	+8.82
Liberal	Ray Morris	22,470	32.15	−3.01
Democrats	Bill Clancy	3.215	4.60	−3.81
Call to Australia	John Jerrow	2,091	2.99	+2.68
Natural Law	Ray Alsop	1,002	1.43	+1.43
Total formal votes		69,893	96.25	+0.75
Informal votes		2,721	3.75	−0.75
Turnout		72,614	96.27	
Two-party-preferred result
Labor	Russ Gorman	44,316	63.42	+4.40
Liberal	Ray Morris	25,556	36.58	−4.40
Labor hold		Swing	+4.40	

=== Gwydir ===
This section is an excerpt from Electoral results for the Division of Gwydir § 1993

1993 Australian federal election: Gwydir
Party	Candidate	Votes	%	±%
National	John Anderson	40,950	57.13	+8.47
Labor	Ted Stubbins	26,916	37.55	+3.37
Confederate Action	Jim Perrett	3,809	5.31	+5.31
Total formal votes		71,675	97.29	−0.27
Informal votes		1,999	2.71	+0.27
Turnout		73,674	96.05	
Two-party-preferred result
National	John Anderson	43,147	60.27	+0.05
Labor	Ted Stubbins	28,442	39.73	−0.05
National hold		Swing	+0.05	

=== Hughes ===
This section is an excerpt from Electoral results for the Division of Hughes § 1993

1993 Australian federal election: Hughes
Party	Candidate	Votes	%	±%
Labor	Robert Tickner	36,714	51.84	+7.05
Liberal	Noel Short	27,075	38.23	−0.13
Democrats	June Young	2,798	3.95	−8.20
Call to Australia	Colin Scott	1,689	2.38	+2.38
Independent	Sue Gunning	1,211	1.71	+1.71
Independent	Joanne Buckley	1,054	1.49	+1.49
Natural Law	Carol Maher	277	0.39	+0.39
Total formal votes		70,818	97.39	−0.38
Informal votes		1,899	2.61	+0.38
Turnout		72,717	97.18	
Two-party-preferred result
Labor	Robert Tickner	39,949	56.42	+0.37
Liberal	Noel Short	30,855	43.58	−0.37
Labor hold		Swing	+0.37	

=== Hume ===
This section is an excerpt from Electoral results for the Division of Hume § 1993

1993 Australian federal election: Hume
Party	Candidate	Votes	%	±%
Labor	Phil Archer	29,773	41.79	+2.03
National	John Sharp	23,942	33.60	+6.18
Liberal	Stephen Ward	13,681	19.20	−2.63
Independent	Dave Cox	2,028	2.85	+2.85
Democrats	Ian Buchanan	1,824	2.56	−6.31
Total formal votes		71,248	97.88	+0.27
Informal votes		1,542	2.12	−0.27
Turnout		72,790	96.94	
Two-party-preferred result
National	John Sharp	38,244	53.70	−0.84
Labor	Phil Archer	32,975	46.30	+0.84
National gain from Liberal		Swing	+53.70	

=== Hunter ===
This section is an excerpt from Electoral results for the Division of Hunter § 1993

1993 Australian federal election: Hunter
Party	Candidate	Votes	%	±%
Labor	Eric Fitzgibbon	43,068	60.60	+9.61
Liberal	Chris Barnes	13,637	19.19	+2.83
National	Bruce Crossing	12,366	17.40	−1.69
Natural Law	Robert Walker	2,004	2.82	+2.82
Total formal votes		71,075	97.64	−0.17
Informal votes		1,719	2.36	+0.17
Turnout		72,794	96.53	
Two-party-preferred result
Labor	Eric Fitzgibbon	45,414	63.92	+4.87
Liberal	Chris Barnes	25,638	36.08	−4.87
Labor hold		Swing	+4.87	

=== Kingsford Smith ===
This section is an excerpt from Electoral results for the Division of Kingsford Smith § 1993

1993 Australian federal election: Kingsford-Smith
Party	Candidate	Votes	%	±%
Labor	Laurie Brereton	41,383	59.15	+9.66
Liberal	Patricia Marsland	22,229	31.77	+0.46
Greens	Murray Matson	2,872	4.11	+2.55
Democrats	Andrew Larcos	2,509	3.59	−5.56
	Warwick Dove	566	0.81	+0.81
Natural Law	Philip Pearson	403	0.58	+0.58
Total formal votes		69,962	95.65	−0.48
Informal votes		3,180	4.35	+0.48
Turnout		73,142	94.93	
Two-party-preferred result
Labor	Laurie Brereton	45,611	65.24	+4.12
Liberal	Patricia Marsland	24,303	34.76	−4.12
Labor hold		Swing	+4.12	

=== Lindsay ===
This section is an excerpt from Electoral results for the Division of Lindsay § 1993

1993 Australian federal election: Lindsay
Party	Candidate	Votes	%	±%
Labor	Ross Free	40,509	58.55	+10.53
Liberal	Carolynn Bellantonio	25,326	36.61	+2.92
Call to Australia	Brian Grigg	3,350	4.84	+1.62
Total formal votes		69,185	96.87	+0.06
Informal votes		2,237	3.13	−0.06
Turnout		71,422	96.63	
Two-party-preferred result
Labor	Ross Free	41,658	60.22	+0.54
Liberal	Carolynn Bellantonio	27,513	39.78	−0.54
Labor hold		Swing	+0.54	

=== Lowe ===
This section is an excerpt from Electoral results for the Division of Lowe § 1993

1993 Australian federal election: Lowe
Party	Candidate	Votes	%	±%
Labor	Mary Easson	34,463	47.51	+8.73
Liberal	Bob Woods	30,151	41.56	−2.85
Greens in Lowe	Bruce Threlfo	1,827	2.52	-1.89
Independent	Peter Woods	1,751	2.41	+2.41
Independent	Anthony Panzarino	1,395	1.92	+1.92
Democrats	Jeff Meikle	1,092	1.51	−6.07
AAFI	Erika Jones	717	0.99	+0.99
Call to Australia	Peter Peterson	490	0.68	−0.70
Independent	Kate Cummings	410	0.57	+0.57
Natural Law	Richard Eager	155	0.21	+0.21
	Erik Lowry	91	0.13	+0.13
Total formal votes		72,542	95.62	−0.54
Informal votes		3,326	4.38	+0.54
Turnout		75,868	95.81	
Two-party-preferred result
Labor	Mary Easson	39,868	55.01	+4.45
Liberal	Bob Woods	32,610	44.99	−4.45
Labor hold		Swing	+4.45	

=== Lyne ===
This section is an excerpt from Electoral results for the Division of Lyne § 1993

1993 Australian federal election: Lyne
Party	Candidate	Votes	%	±%
Labor	Dennis Driver	28,424	40.63	+9.77
National	Mark Vaile	18,670	26.69	−25.53
Liberal	John Barrett	18,668	26.68	+26.68
Independent EFF	Marje Roswell	2,247	3.21	+3.21
Democrats	John Stokes	1,949	2.79	−10.40
Total formal votes		69,958	97.93	+0.15
Informal votes		1,478	2.07	−0.15
Turnout		71,436	96.50	
Two-party-preferred result
National	Mark Vaile	37,918	54.24	−5.21
Labor	Dennis Driver	31,993	45.76	+5.21
National hold		Swing	−5.21	

=== Macarthur ===
This section is an excerpt from Electoral results for the Division of Macarthur § 1993

1993 Australian federal election: Macarthur
Party	Candidate	Votes	%	±%
Labor	Chris Haviland	31,990	46.51	+5.87
Liberal	Ron Forrester	30,647	44.56	+4.40
Independent	Herb Bethune	3,660	5.32	+5.32
Independent	Peter Gadsby	2,478	3.60	+3.60
Total formal votes		68,775	97.12	+0.20
Informal votes		2,038	2.88	−0.20
Turnout		70,813	96.13	
Two-party-preferred result
Labor	Chris Haviland	35,258	51.28	−1.33
Liberal	Ron Forrester	33,496	48.72	+1.33
Labor hold		Swing	−1.33	

=== Mackellar ===
This section is an excerpt from Electoral results for the Division of Mackellar § 1993

1993 Australian federal election: Mackellar
Party	Candidate	Votes	%	±%
Liberal	Jim Carlton	41,100	56.61	+5.27
Labor	Charles Wild	24,126	33.23	+8.08
Democrats	Brian Johnson	5,139	7.08	−10.52
Call to Australia	Lesley Maher	1,253	1.73	+0.11
Natural Law	Valdamar Kurylenko	981	1.35	+1.35
Total formal votes		72,599	97.00	−0.26
Informal votes		2,247	3.00	+0.26
Turnout		74,846	95.77	
Two-party-preferred result
Liberal	Jim Carlton	44,394	61.16	−0.51
Labor	Charles Wild	28,193	38.84	+0.51
Liberal hold		Swing	−0.51	

=== Macquarie ===
This section is an excerpt from Electoral results for the Division of Macquarie § 1993

1993 Australian federal election: Macquarie
Party	Candidate	Votes	%	±%
Liberal	Alasdair Webster	30,809	44.36	−0.15
Labor	Maggie Deahm	29,504	42.49	+9.95
Democrats	Jon Rickard	4,621	6.65	−6.81
Greens	Petar Ivanovski	2,633	3.79	+3.79
Independent	Garth Hutchinson	1,531	2.20	+2.20
Natural Law	Roger Fay	347	0.50	+0.50
Total formal votes		69,445	97.50	−0.24
Informal votes		1,780	2.50	+0.24
Turnout		71,225	96.05	
Two-party-preferred result
Labor	Maggie Deahm	34,783	50.12	+1.90
Liberal	Alasdair Webster	34,619	49.88	−1.90
Labor gain from Liberal		Swing	+1.90	

=== Mitchell ===
This section is an excerpt from Electoral results for the Division of Mitchell § 1993

1993 Australian federal election: Mitchell
Party	Candidate	Votes	%	±%
Liberal	Alan Cadman	43,819	64.89	+1.98
Labor	Julie Kanaghines	19,036	28.19	+5.97
Democrats	Roger Posgate	3,664	5.43	−6.58
Confederate Action	Charles Anderson	1,005	1.49	+1.49
Total formal votes		67,524	97.68	−0.33
Informal votes		1,602	2.32	+0.33
Turnout		69,126	96.84	
Two-party-preferred result
Liberal	Alan Cadman	46,347	68.67	−1.36
Labor	Julie Kanaghines	21,149	31.33	+1.36
Liberal hold		Swing	−1.36	

=== New England ===
This section is an excerpt from Electoral results for the Division of New England § 1993

1993 Australian federal election: New England
Party	Candidate	Votes	%	±%
National	Ian Sinclair	37,386	52.70	+3.05
Labor	Chris Watt	24,268	34.21	−0.74
Independent	Warren Woodgate	7,717	10.88	+10.88
Independent	Glen Hausfield	1,570	2.21	+2.21
Total formal votes		70,941	97.88	+0.10
Informal votes		1,538	2.12	−0.10
Turnout		72,479	96.63	
Two-party-preferred result
National	Ian Sinclair	42,693	60.20	+3.92
Labor	Chris Watt	28,226	39.80	−3.92
National hold		Swing	+3.92	

=== Newcastle ===
This section is an excerpt from Electoral results for the Division of Newcastle § 1993

1993 Australian federal election: Newcastle
Party	Candidate	Votes	%	±%
Labor	Allan Morris	41,268	56.67	+4.82
Liberal	Glenn Turner	20,030	27.51	+8.48
Greens	James Whelan	5,349	7.35	+7.35
Independent	Ivan Welsh	2,658	3.65	+3.65
Democrats	Greg Baines	2,109	2.90	−8.92
Call to Australia	Jim Kendall	762	1.05	+1.05
	Lewina Jackson	354	0.49	+0.49
Independent	Frank Blefari	292	0.40	+0.40
Total formal votes		72,822	97.05	−0.35
Informal votes		2,212	2.95	+0.35
Turnout		75,034	96.46	
Two-party-preferred result
Labor	Allan Morris	48,683	66.88	+4.08
Liberal	Glenn Turner	24,107	33.12	+33.12
Labor hold		Swing	+4.08	

=== North Sydney ===
This section is an excerpt from Electoral results for the Division of North Sydney § 1993

1993 Australian federal election: North Sydney
Party	Candidate	Votes	%	±%
Liberal	Bruce McNeilly	34,490	45.94	+1.69
Independent	Ted Mack	26,535	35.34	+0.99
Labor	Richard Elstone	12,759	16.99	+2.66
Independent	Stuart Carraill	877	1.17	+1.17
Natural Law	Ian Stokes	422	0.56	+0.56
Total formal votes		75,083	97.97	−0.07
Informal votes		1,559	2.03	+0.07
Turnout		76,642	94.56	
Notional two-party-preferred count
Liberal	Bruce McNeilly	44,681	59.53	−0.46
Labor	Richard Elstone	30,379	40.47	+0.46
Two-candidate-preferred result
Independent	Ted Mack	38,912	51.84	+4.8
Liberal	Bruce McNeilly	36,154	48.16	−4.8
Independent notional gain from Liberal		Swing	+4.8	

The sitting member was Ted Mack (Independent) however a redistribution gave a notional Liberal majority.

=== Page ===
This section is an excerpt from Electoral results for the Division of Page § 1993

1993 Australian federal election: Page
Party	Candidate	Votes	%	±%
Labor	Harry Woods	30,772	41.83	+8.04
National	Mike Emerson	21,206	28.83	−13.14
Liberal	Malcolm Marshall	12,732	17.31	+17.31
Independent	Ros Irwin	2,890	3.93	+3.93
Independent	Rhondda O'Neill	2,446	3.32	+3.32
Richmond/Clarence Greens	Elle Fikke	1,766	2.40	+2.40
Democrats	Deborah Inglis	985	1.34	−6.07
Confederate Action	Lindsay Olen	377	0.51	+0.51
Independent	Graeme Lean	259	0.35	+0.35
Natural Law	Antoinette Perry	134	0.18	+0.18
Total formal votes		73,567	97.94	−0.25
Informal votes		1,545	2.06	+0.25
Turnout		75,112	96.27	
Two-party-preferred result
Labor	Harry Woods	36,809	50.13	−0.66
National	Mike Emerson	36,616	49.87	+0.66
Labor hold		Swing	−0.66	

=== Parkes ===
This section is an excerpt from Electoral results for the Division of Parkes § 1993

1993 Australian federal election: Parkes
Party	Candidate	Votes	%	±%
National	Michael Cobb	35,649	47.50	−2.81
Labor	Barry Brebner	34,160	45.52	+3.49
Democrats	Noel Plumb	2,333	3.11	−3.16
Independent	Terrence Seton	2,183	2.91	+2.91
Natural Law	David McLennan	722	0.96	+0.96
Total formal votes		75,047	97.53	+0.60
Informal votes		1,904	2.47	−0.60
Turnout		76,951	95.56	
Two-party-preferred result
National	Michael Cobb	37,907	50.53	−3.80
Labor	Barry Brebner	37,105	49.47	+3.80
National hold		Swing	−3.80	

=== Parramatta ===
This section is an excerpt from Electoral results for the Division of Parramatta § 1993

1993 Australian federal election: Parramatta
Party	Candidate	Votes	%	±%
Labor	Paul Elliott	35,793	49.24	+7.44
Liberal	Max Rawnsley	30,681	42.21	−0.76
Democrats	Bill Rosier	2,399	3.30	−8.23
Independent	Sam Papadopoulos	1,887	2.60	+2.60
Call to Australia	John Shields	1,044	1.44	+1.44
Confederate Action	John Wilson	458	0.63	+0.63
Natural Law	Rodney Forshaw	431	0.59	+0.59
Total formal votes		72,693	97.09	+0.14
Informal votes		2,177	2.91	−0.14
Turnout		74,870	96.07	
Two-party-preferred result
Labor	Paul Elliott	38,673	53.24	+2.46
Liberal	Max Rawnsley	33,966	46.76	−2.46
Labor hold		Swing	+2.46	

=== Paterson ===
This section is an excerpt from Electoral results for the Division of Paterson § 1993

1993 Australian federal election: Paterson
Party	Candidate	Votes	%	±%
Labor	Bob Horne	33,012	47.50	+7.05
Liberal	Bob Roberts	24,510	35.27	+19.95
National	Gary Watson	4,719	6.79	−22.47
Greens	Bernadette Smith	1,981	2.85	+2.85
Democrats	Rodger Riach	1,396	2.01	−12.74
Independent	Bruce MacKenzie	1,348	1.94	+1.94
Independent	Bernie Neville	1,295	1.86	+1.86
Natural Law	Alan McDonald	810	1.17	+1.17
Confederate Action	Ron Franks	421	0.61	+0.61
Total formal votes		69,492	97.63	−0.05
Informal votes		1,688	2.37	+0.05
Turnout		71,180	96.99	
Two-party-preferred result
Labor	Bob Horne	37,006	53.30	+3.27
Liberal	Bob Roberts	32,421	46.70	−3.27
Labor notional hold		Swing	+3.27	

=== Prospect ===
This section is an excerpt from Electoral results for the Division of Prospect § 1993

1993 Australian federal election: Prospect
Party	Candidate	Votes	%	±%
Labor	Janice Crosio	44,039	65.37	+9.78
Liberal	Paul Newton	17,593	26.11	−4.09
Democrats	Dick Pike	3,044	4.52	−5.02
Independent	Norman Byleveld	777	1.15	+1.15
	Sue Bull	763	1.13	+1.13
Independent	Alan Byers	757	1.12	+1.12
Natural Law	Reg Paling	397	0.59	+0.59
Total formal votes		67,370	94.38	+0.32
Informal votes		4,015	5.62	−0.32
Turnout		71,385	96.14	
Two-party-preferred result
Labor	Janice Crosio	46,451	69.04	+5.59
Liberal	Paul Newton	20,834	30.96	−5.59
Labor hold		Swing	+5.59	

=== Reid ===
This section is an excerpt from Electoral results for the Division of Reid § 1993

1993 Australian federal election: Reid
Party	Candidate	Votes	%	±%
Labor	Laurie Ferguson	45,714	64.71	+9.75
Liberal	Eyup Guner	19,711	27.90	−1.43
Independent	Carmel Emtage	1,942	2.75	+2.75
Western Suburbs Greens	Jennifer Long	1,524	2.16	+2.16
	Paul Locke	1,098	1.55	+1.55
Natural Law	Stephen Doric	660	0.93	+0.93
Total formal votes		70,749	95.13	+0.42
Informal votes		3,619	4.87	−0.42
Turnout		74,268	95.54	
Two-party-preferred result
Labor	Laurie Ferguson	48,579	68.80	+4.05
Liberal	Eyup Guner	22,025	31.20	−4.05
Labor hold		Swing	+4.05	

=== Richmond ===
This section is an excerpt from Electoral results for the Division of Richmond § 1993

1993 Australian federal election: Richmond
Party	Candidate	Votes	%	±%
Labor	Neville Newell	30,418	44.21	+13.80
National	Larry Anthony	17,700	25.73	−16.07
Liberal	Bruce Francis	14,521	21.11	+21.11
Greens	Josephine Faith	3,167	4.60	+4.60
Democrats	Eddy Kemp	1,536	2.23	−5.10
Independent	Hugh Ermacora	812	1.18	+1.18
Confederate Action	Fred Crooks	261	0.38	+0.38
Independent	Christopher McIlrath	230	0.33	+0.33
Natural Law	Moira Grayndler	155	0.23	+0.23
Total formal votes		68,800	96.93	−0.90
Informal votes		2,176	3.07	+0.90
Turnout		70,976	95.64	
Two-party-preferred result
Labor	Neville Newell	35,598	51.77	+1.26
National	Larry Anthony	33,160	48.23	−1.26
Labor hold		Swing	+1.26	

=== Riverina ===
This section is an excerpt from Electoral results for the Division of Riverina § 1993

1993 Australian federal election: Riverina
Party	Candidate	Votes	%	±%
National	Noel Hicks	28,177	38.47	+7.67
Labor	Pat Brassil	24,606	33.59	+0.66
Liberal	Bill Heffernan	17,386	23.74	−3.20
Independent	Paul Meredith	2,233	3.05	+3.05
Natural Law	Margaret ter Haar	847	1.16	+1.16
Total formal votes		73,249	97.66	+0.07
Informal votes		1,755	2.34	−0.07
Turnout		75,004	96.13	
Two-party-preferred result
National	Noel Hicks	46,078	62.93	+0.67
Labor	Pat Brassil	27,147	37.07	−0.67
National notional hold		Swing	+0.67	

=== Robertson ===
This section is an excerpt from Electoral results for the Division of Robertson § 1993

1993 Australian federal election: Robertson
Party	Candidate	Votes	%	±%
Labor	Frank Walker	34,275	50.15	+10.61
Liberal	Mike Gallacher	28,226	41.30	+5.93
Democrats	Glenice Griffiths	3,311	4.84	−10.04
Central Coast Greens	Bryan Ellis	2,218	3.25	+0.57
Natural Law	Beth Eager	310	0.45	+0.45
Total formal votes		68,340	97.77	+0.19
Informal votes		1,560	2.23	−0.19
Turnout		69,900	96.26	
Two-party-preferred result
Labor	Frank Walker	37,960	55.55	+2.56
Liberal	Mike Gallacher	30,369	44.45	−2.56
Labor hold		Swing	+2.56	

=== Shortland ===
This section is an excerpt from Electoral results for the Division of Shortland § 1993

1993 Australian federal election: Shortland
Party	Candidate	Votes	%	±%
Labor	Peter Morris	43,012	61.84	+7.80
Liberal	Laurie Coghlan	20,082	28.87	+6.19
Democrats	Michael Reckenberg	3,864	5.56	−5.14
Call to Australia	Ivan Morrow	1,113	1.60	+1.60
	Terry Cook	737	1.06	+1.06
Natural Law	Brett Randall	413	0.59	+0.59
	Geoff Payne	329	0.47	+0.47
Total formal votes		69,550	97.44	−0.04
Informal votes		1,824	2.56	+0.04
Turnout		71,374	96.61	
Two-party-preferred result
Labor	Peter Morris	46,813	67.33	+1.54
Liberal	Laurie Coghlan	22,713	32.67	−1.54
Labor hold		Swing	+1.54	

=== Sydney ===
This section is an excerpt from Electoral results for the Division of Sydney § 1993

1993 Australian federal election: Sydney
Party	Candidate	Votes	%	±%
Labor	Peter Baldwin	41,621	58.48	+13.40
Liberal	James Fisher	18,493	25.98	−0.87
Greens	Mark Berriman	5,513	7.75	+3.37
Democrats	Bob Dawson	2,805	3.94	−9.70
	Margaret Gleeson	1,914	2.69	+2.69
Natural Law	Bronia Hatfield	639	0.90	+0.90
	Donald O'Halloran	183	0.26	+0.26
Total formal votes		71,168	96.76	+0.33
Informal votes		2,385	3.24	−0.33
Turnout		73,553	92.45	
Two-party-preferred result
Labor	Peter Baldwin	49,402	69.47	+4.38
Liberal	James Fisher	21,708	30.53	−4.38
Labor hold		Swing	+4.38	

=== Throsby ===
This section is an excerpt from Electoral results for the Division of Throwsby § 1993

1993 Australian federal election: Throsby
Party	Candidate	Votes	%	±%
Labor	Colin Hollis	39,476	58.44	+5.00
Liberal	Peter Josevski	11,394	16.87	−1.41
Rex Connor Labor	Rex Connor	7,083	10.48	+2.63
Greens	Karla Sperling	2,838	4.20	+4.20
Democrats	Tom Hadley	2,242	3.32	−10.49
Call to Australia	Brian Hughes	1,458	2.16	+2.16
	Dragan Grijak	1,124	1.66	+1.66
AAFI	David Hughes	1,015	1.50	+1.50
	Margaret Perrott	657	0.97	+0.97
Natural Law	Richard Barnes	267	0.40	+0.40
Total formal votes		67,554	95.79	−0.50
Informal votes		2,970	4.21	+0.50
Turnout		70,524	96.51	
Two-party-preferred result
Labor	Colin Hollis	49,911	74.02	+5.08
Liberal	Peter Josevski	17,515	25.98	−5.08
Labor hold		Swing	+5.08	

=== Warringah ===
This section is an excerpt from Electoral results for the Division of Warringah § 1993

1993 Australian federal election: Warringah
Party	Candidate	Votes	%	±%
Liberal	Michael MacKellar	40,983	56.10	+1.34
Labor	Steve Cannane	24,690	33.80	+5.39
Democrats	Simon Disney	3,112	4.26	−11.79
Independent	Hugh Walker	2,762	3.78	+3.78
Natural Law	Catherine Knowles	1,502	2.06	+2.06
Total formal votes		73,049	97.62	+0.19
Informal votes		1,781	2.38	−0.19
Turnout		74,830	95.47	
Two-party-preferred result
Liberal	Michael MacKellar	44,007	60.26	−0.59
Labor	Steve Cannane	29,027	39.74	+0.59
Liberal hold		Swing	−0.59	

=== Watson ===
This section is an excerpt from Electoral results for the Division of Watson § 1993

1993 Australian federal election: Watson
Party	Candidate	Votes	%	±%
Labor	Leo McLeay	41,701	59.56	+9.74
Liberal	Bernard O'Bree	21,330	30.46	−4.06
Independent EFF	Col Harding	2,499	3.57	+3.57
Democrats	Amelia Newman	2,457	3.51	−5.45
Independent	George Tsirkas	952	1.36	+1.36
Independent	Brian Meyer	721	1.03	+0.99
Natural Law	M. Chaplin	355	0.51	+0.51
Total formal votes		70,015	94.94	+0.43
Informal votes		3,732	5.06	−0.43
Turnout		73,747	95.47	
Two-party-preferred result
Labor	Leo McLeay	45,355	64.84	+6.14
Liberal	Bernard O'Bree	24,593	35.16	−6.14
Labor notional hold		Swing	+6.14	

=== Wentworth ===
This section is an excerpt from Electoral results for the Division of Wentworth § 1993

1993 Australian federal election: Wentworth
Party	Candidate	Votes	%	±%
Liberal	John Hewson	38,850	52.67	+5.46
Labor	Paul Pearce	27,146	36.81	+4.64
Eastern Suburbs Greens	Ben Oquist	4,350	5.90	+5.90
Democrats	Armon Hicks	2,055	2.79	−6.80
Independent	Susan Durovic	598	0.81	+0.81
Natural Law	Patricia Boland	503	0.68	+0.68
	Zanny Begg	253	0.34	+0.34
Total formal votes		73,765	97.09	+0.13
Informal votes		2,209	2.91	−0.13
Turnout		75,974	94.55	
Two-party-preferred result
Liberal	John Hewson	40,891	55.46	+0.67
Labor	Paul Pearce	32,843	44.54	−0.67
Liberal hold		Swing	+0.67	

=== Werriwa ===
This section is an excerpt from Electoral results for the Division of Werriwa § 1993

1993 Australian federal election: Werriwa
Party	Candidate	Votes	%	±%
Labor	John Kerin	41,725	61.40	+9.23
Liberal	Rick Lewis	20,722	30.50	+0.48
Democrats	Peter Fraser	3,376	4.97	−5.31
Natural Law	Julie Chamberlain	2,129	3.13	+3.13
Total formal votes		67,952	96.00	−0.30
Informal votes		2,830	4.00	+0.30
Turnout		70,782	95.30	
Two-party-preferred result
Labor	John Kerin	44,671	65.77	+1.69
Liberal	Rick Lewis	23,250	34.23	−1.69
Labor hold		Swing	+1.69	

== See also ==
- Results of the 1993 Australian federal election (House of Representatives)
- Members of the Australian House of Representatives, 1993–1996
