= Electoral results for the Division of Throsby =

Australian division election results

This is a list of electoral results for the Division of Throsby in Australian federal elections from the division's creation in 1984 until its abolition in 2016.

== Members ==
Member	Party	Term
Colin Hollis	Labor	1984–2001
Jennie George	Labor	2001–2010
Stephen Jones	Labor	2010–2016

== Election results ==
=== Elections in the 2010s ===
2013 Australian federal election: Throsby
Party	Candidate	Votes	%	±%
Labor	Stephen Jones	37,980	45.00	−5.53
Liberal	Larissa Mallinson	23,498	27.84	−2.47
National	Gary Anderson	8,539	10.12	+4.80
Greens	Peter Moran	4,613	5.47	−6.46
Palmer United	May King	3,885	4.60	+4.60
Independent	Paul Matters	1,948	2.31	+2.31
Christian Democrats	John Kadwell	1,938	2.30	+2.30
Bullet Train	Elrond Veness	677	0.80	+0.80
Katter's Australian	Glenn Turner	473	0.56	+0.56
Non-Custodial Parents	Wayne Hartman	435	0.52	−1.39
Democratic Labour	Brian Boulton	407	0.48	+0.48
Total formal votes		84,393	91.17	−1.93
Informal votes		8,174	8.83	+1.93
Turnout		92,567	94.13	+0.50
Two-party-preferred result
Labor	Stephen Jones	48,753	57.77	−4.34
Liberal	Larissa Mallinson	35,640	42.23	+4.34
Labor hold		Swing	−4.34	

==== 2010 ====
2010 Australian federal election: Throsby
Party	Candidate	Votes	%	±%
Labor	Stephen Jones	42,227	50.53	−7.69
Liberal	Juliet Arkwright	25,330	30.31	+1.35
Greens	Peter Moran	9,973	11.93	+2.99
National	Alan Hay	4,446	5.32	+5.32
Non-Custodial Parents	Wayne Hartman	1,595	1.91	+1.91
Total formal votes		83,571	93.10	−2.03
Informal votes		6,197	6.90	+2.03
Turnout		89,768	93.63	−2.23
Two-party-preferred result
Labor	Stephen Jones	51,909	62.11	−4.65
Liberal	Juliet Arkwright	31,662	37.89	+4.65
Labor hold		Swing	−4.65	

=== Elections in the 2000s ===
==== 2007 ====
2007 Australian federal election: Throsby
Party	Candidate	Votes	%	±%
Labor	Jennie George	52,275	64.98	+9.97
Liberal	Stuart Wright	18,266	22.71	−9.40
Greens	Peter Moran	7,308	9.08	−0.97
Christian Democrats	Scott Deakes	2,598	3.23	+2.97
Total formal votes		80,447	94.76	+0.20
Informal votes		4,446	5.24	−0.20
Turnout		84,893	95.92	+0.44
Two-party-preferred result
Labor	Jennie George	59,099	73.46	+9.64
Liberal	Stuart Wright	21,348	26.54	−9.64
Labor hold		Swing	+9.64	

==== 2004 ====
2004 Australian federal election: Throsby
Party	Candidate	Votes	%	±%
Labor	Jennie George	44,495	56.26	+1.36
Liberal	Linda Nelson	24,519	31.00	+5.78
Greens	Trevor Jones	7,995	10.11	+5.61
Democrats	Madeleine Roberts	2,078	2.63	−4.88
Total formal votes		79,087	94.47	−0.34
Informal votes		4,629	5.53	+0.34
Turnout		83,716	95.87	+0.36
Two-party-preferred result
Labor	Jennie George	51,407	65.00	−0.10
Liberal	Linda Nelson	27,680	35.00	+0.10
Labor hold		Swing	−0.10	

==== 2001 ====
2001 Australian federal election: Throsby
Party	Candidate	Votes	%	±%
Labor	Jennie George	41,963	54.90	−6.32
Liberal	Alan Akhurst	19,280	25.22	+7.84
Democrats	Madeleine Roberts	5,743	7.51	+3.72
One Nation	Ivan Prsa	4,969	6.50	−4.83
Greens	Elsa Story	3,444	4.51	+1.45
	Margaret Perrott	1,043	1.36	+1.36
Total formal votes		76,442	94.81	−1.29
Informal votes		4,183	5.19	+1.29
Turnout		80,625	96.06	
Two-party-preferred result
Labor	Jennie George	49,767	65.10	−7.32
Liberal	Alan Akhurst	26,675	34.90	+7.32
Labor hold		Swing	−7.32	

=== Elections in the 1990s ===
==== 1998 ====
1998 Australian federal election: Throsby
Party	Candidate	Votes	%	±%
Labor	Colin Hollis	44,468	61.27	+0.43
Liberal	Charlie Mifsud	12,538	17.27	−4.43
One Nation	Dan Orr	8,267	11.39	+11.39
Democrats	Ann Barry	2,751	3.79	−4.69
Greens	Karla Sperling	2,230	3.07	−2.07
Christian Democrats	Brian Hughes	1,949	2.69	−1.16
Socialist Equality	Peter Stavropoulos	379	0.52	+0.52
Total formal votes		72,582	96.10	−0.03
Informal votes		2,948	3.90	+0.03
Turnout		75,530	95.75	−1.34
Two-party-preferred result
Labor	Colin Hollis	52,593	72.46	+2.84
Liberal	Charlie Mifsud	19,989	27.54	−2.84
Labor hold		Swing	+2.84	

==== 1996 ====
1996 Australian federal election: Throsby
Party	Candidate	Votes	%	±%
Labor	Colin Hollis	42,963	60.83	+2.40
Liberal	Albert Galea	15,326	21.70	+4.83
Democrats	Elizabeth Fisher	5,990	8.48	+5.16
Greens	Les Robinson	3,629	5.14	+0.94
Call to Australia	Brian Hughes	2,716	3.85	+1.69
Total formal votes		70,624	96.12	+0.34
Informal votes		2,848	3.88	−0.34
Turnout		73,472	97.10	+0.58
Two-party-preferred result
Labor	Colin Hollis	48,966	69.62	−4.41
Liberal	Albert Galea	21,369	30.38	+4.41
Labor hold		Swing	−4.41	

==== 1993 ====
1993 Australian federal election: Throsby
Party	Candidate	Votes	%	±%
Labor	Colin Hollis	39,476	58.44	+5.00
Liberal	Peter Josevski	11,394	16.87	−1.41
Rex Connor Labor	Rex Connor	7,083	10.48	+2.63
Greens	Karla Sperling	2,838	4.20	+4.20
Democrats	Tom Hadley	2,242	3.32	−10.49
Call to Australia	Brian Hughes	1,458	2.16	+2.16
	Dragan Grijak	1,124	1.66	+1.66
Against Further Immigration	David Hughes	1,015	1.50	+1.50
	Margaret Perrott	657	0.97	+0.97
Natural Law	Richard Barnes	267	0.40	+0.40
Total formal votes		67,554	95.79	−0.50
Informal votes		2,970	4.21	+0.50
Turnout		70,524	96.51	
Two-party-preferred result
Labor	Colin Hollis	49,911	74.02	+5.08
Liberal	Peter Josevski	17,515	25.98	−5.08
Labor hold		Swing	+5.08	

==== 1990 ====
1990 Australian federal election: Throsby
Party	Candidate	Votes	%	±%
Labor	Colin Hollis	31,310	47.8	−3.6
Liberal	Garry Noel-Gough	19,706	30.1	+7.8
Democrats	Greg Butler	10,034	15.3	+7.8
Independent	Ronald Henderson	2,298	3.5	+3.5
Australian Gruen	Lyn Allison	1,146	1.7	+1.7
Independent	David Reilly	1,071	1.6	+1.6
Total formal votes		65,565	97.4	
Informal votes		1,763	2.6	
Turnout		67,328	95.9	
Two-party-preferred result
Labor	Colin Hollis	39,418	60.2	+3.1
Liberal	Garry Noel-Gough	26,043	39.8	−3.1
Labor hold		Swing	+3.1	

=== Elections in the 1980s ===
==== 1987 ====
1987 Australian federal election: Throsby
Party	Candidate	Votes	%	±%
Labor	Colin Hollis	30,354	51.4	−5.7
Liberal	Neville Fredericks	20,456	34.6	+8.0
Democrats	Greg Butler	4,458	7.5	+1.9
National	David Wood	3,812	6.5	−3.0
Total formal votes		59,080	95.5	
Informal votes		2,815	4.5	
Turnout		61,895	95.7	
Two-party-preferred result
Labor	Colin Hollis	33,718	57.1	−4.6
Liberal	Neville Fredericks	25,359	42.9	+4.6
Labor hold		Swing	−4.6	

==== 1984 ====
1984 Australian federal election: Throsby
Party	Candidate	Votes	%	±%
Labor	Colin Hollis	31,472	57.1	+2.0
Liberal	Wendy Stubbs	14,648	26.6	−11.2
National	Duncan Gair	5,241	9.5	+9.5
Democrats	Alan Cole	3,095	5.6	+0.9
Independent	Paul Trevardis	399	0.7	+0.7
Independent	Martin Essenberg	298	0.5	+0.5
Total formal votes		55,153	94.9	
Informal votes		2,975	5.1	
Turnout		58,128	94.9	
Two-party-preferred result
Labor	Colin Hollis	33,989	61.7	+2.7
Liberal	Wendy Stubbs	21,139	38.3	−2.7
Labor notional hold		Swing	+2.7	
