= 2002 Cunningham by-election =

Australian federal by-election

- 19 October 2002
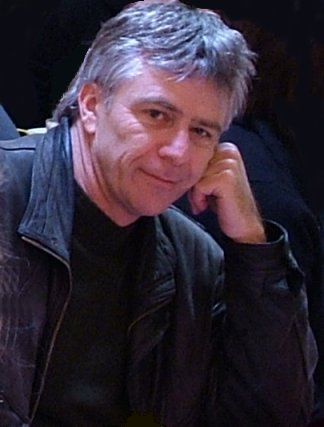

	First party	Second party
Candidate	Michael Organ	Sharon Bird
Party	Greens	Labor
Primary vote	15,505	25,671
Percentage	23.03%	38.13%
Swing	▲16.39	▼6.06
TCP	52.23%	47.77%
TCP swing	▲52.23	▼12.88
	Third party	Fourth party
	IND	IND
Candidate	David Moulds	Peter Wilson
Party	Ind. Liberal	Ind. Labor
Primary vote	9,147	7,107
Percentage	13.59%	10.56%
Swing	▲13.59	▲10.56
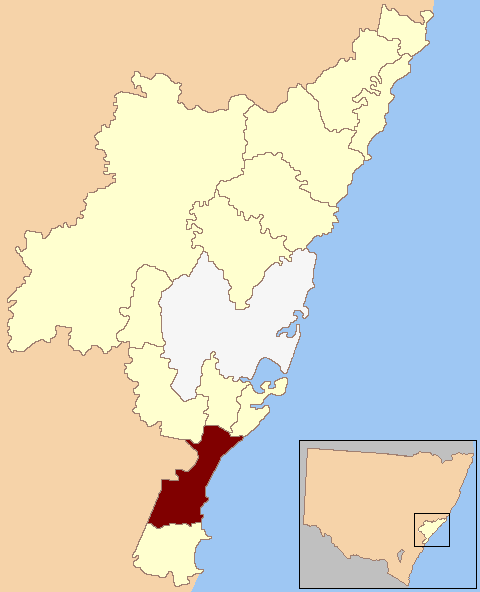
- Cunningham (dark) within New South Wales
MP before election
Stephen Martin
Labor
Elected MP
Michael Organ
Greens

The 2002 Cunningham by-election was held on 19 October 2002 to elect the member for Cunningham in the Australian House of Representatives, following the resignation of Labor Party MP Stephen Martin.

The by-election was notable as it was won by Michael Organ, the candidate for the Australian Greens, making Cunningham the first seat in the House of Representatives to be won by a minor party since Jack Lang won Reid for his Lang Labor party in 1946, and the first seat in the House won by the Greens.

== Background ==
Cunningham had been held by Labor since its creation 52 years previously, but a recent local government election for Lord Mayor of Wollongong had seen the Labor candidate lose to an independent, Alex Darling, causing concern in the ALP about their ability to hold the seat given the expectation of a significant protest vote against them. The ALP candidate preselected to replace Martin was Sharon Bird.

The Liberal Party of Australia received 28 percent of the primary vote at the previous election, but chose not to run a candidate in the by-election. Independent candidate David Moulds held Liberal Party membership.

The writ for the by-election was issued on 16 September 2002.

== Results ==
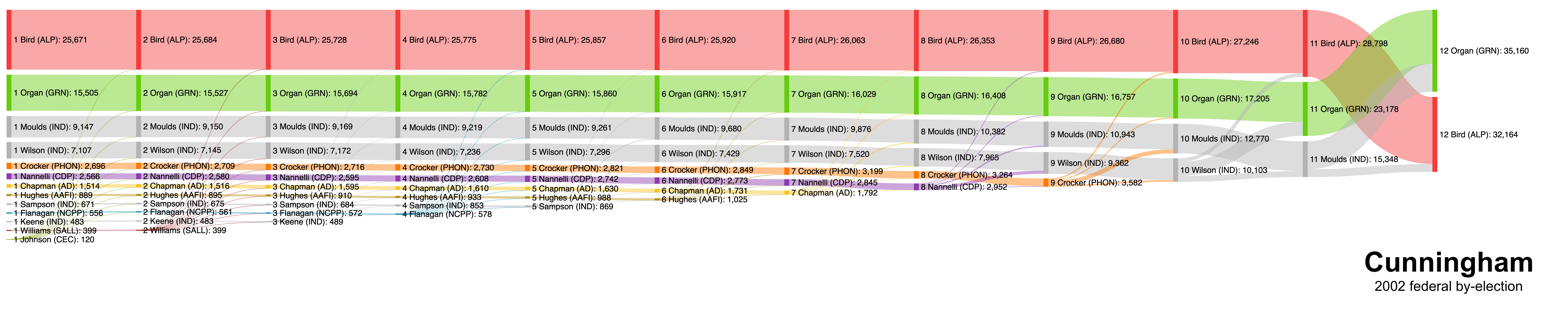
The distribution of preferences in the by-election resulted in the election of Michael Organ.

2002 Cunningham by-election
Party	Candidate	Votes	%	±%
Labor	Sharon Bird	25,671	38.13	−6.06
Greens	Michael Organ	15,505	23.03	+16.39
Independent Liberal	David Moulds	9,147	13.59	+13.59
Independent Labor	Peter Wilson	7,107	10.56	+10.56
One Nation	Geoff Crocker	2,696	4.00	−0.63
Christian Democrats	Owen Nannelli	2,566	3.81	+1.32
Democrats	Linda Chapman	1,514	2.25	−4.92
AAFI	David Hughes	889	1.32	+1.32
Independent	Meg Sampson	671	1.00	+1.00
Non-Custodial Parents	John Flanagan	556	0.83	+0.83
Independent	James Keene	483	0.72	+0.72
Socialist Alliance	Chris Williams	399	0.59	+0.59
Citizens Electoral Council	Hal A. Johnson	120	0.18	+0.18
Total formal votes		67,324	92.26	−2.90
Informal votes		5,647	7.74	+2.90
Turnout		72,971	89.51	−5.91
Two-candidate-preferred result
Greens	Michael Organ	35,160	52.23	+52.23
Labor	Sharon Bird	32,164	47.77	−12.88
Greens gain from Labor				

== Aftermath ==
Although Labor received the highest primary vote, the Australian Greens candidate, Michael Organ, won the by-election on a 52.2 percent two-candidate preferred (2CP) vote. Asymmetrical preference flows in the absence of an official Liberal candidate contributed to Labor losing the seat, with their 2CP being reduced by 12.9 percent. Labor, Liberal and Green all contested Cunningham in the 2004 federal election, Labor won the seat back with a two-party preferred (2PP) vote of over 60 percent. However, other factors attributed by some to the loss include Martin's premature departure, a messy preselection process for Bird, and discontent from the NSW Labor branch towards federal leader Simon Crean.

== See also ==
- List of Australian federal by-elections
