= Michael Organ =

Australian politician

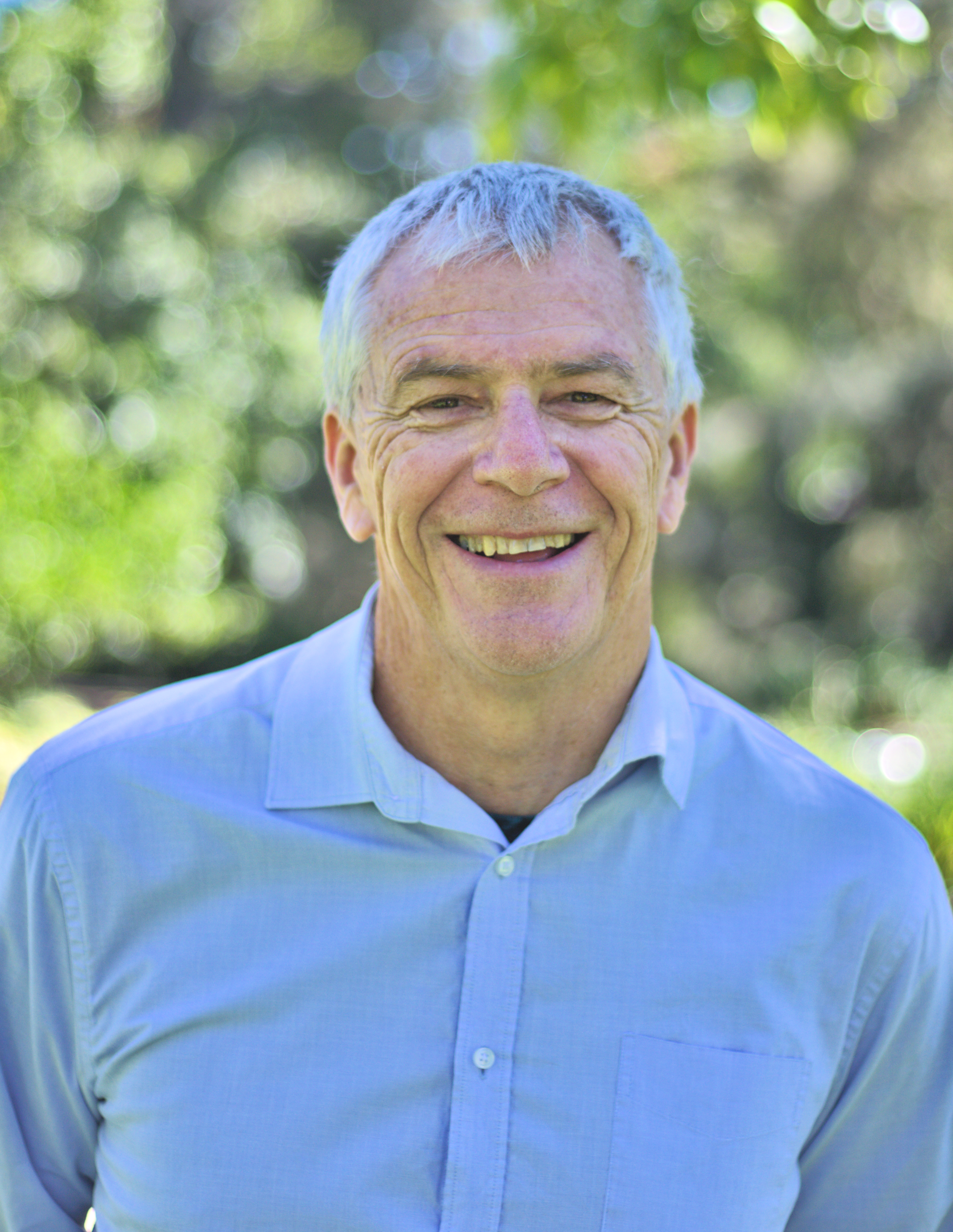
- Organ in 2022

Member of the Australian Parliament for Cunningham
- In office 19 October 2002 – 9 October 2004
- Preceded by: Stephen Martin
- Succeeded by: Sharon Bird

Personal details
- Born: Michael Keith Organ; 22 September 1956 (age 70) Bulli, New South Wales
- Party: Australian Greens
- Children: Andrew, Kyle, India, Emma
- Occupation: Archivist
- Website: Home page (2021)

Michael Keith Organ (born 22 September 1956) is a former Australian politician and archivist. He was an Australian Greens member of the Australian House of Representatives between 2002 and 2004, representing the Division of Cunningham, New South Wales. He was the first member of the Greens to win a seat in the House of Representatives, having won a by-election which the Liberal Party did not contest.

== Life and education ==
Organ was born in Bulli, New South Wales. His mother was a hospital domestic and his father was a brickworker. He studied geology at the University of Wollongong and completed a post-graduate diploma in archive administration at the University of New South Wales, where he subsequently took up a post as an archivist. He was employed at the University of Wollongong library, as an archivist (1996–2002) and, as of 5 May 2013, manager, repository services until 1 November 2020.

Three months before the Cunningham by-election, he unsuccessfully contested the local government election for the lord mayoralship of Wollongong.

In 2005, Organ discovered a print of the 1927 film Metropolis containing missing scenes. This print was used to create a restored version of the film, which re-premiered in 2010.

He has four children, Andrew (b. 1991), Kyle (b. 1993), India (b. 2008) and Emma (b. 2011).

== Electoral history ==
=== Cunningham by-election ===
The federal division of Cunningham has been a safe Labor seat since its creation in 1949. On 16 August 2002, the sitting member, Dr Stephen Martin, unexpectedly resigned, causing a by-election.

The ALP preselected a TAFE teacher, Sharon Bird, by decision of the party executive rather than the usual rank-and-file nomination procedure, and the Liberal party opted not to contest the by-election.

Organ was endorsed by the South Coast Labour Council and received strong preference flows from two popular independent candidates, David Moulds and Peter Wilson. He gained 23% of the primary vote and 52% after allocation of preferences, defeating Bird and becoming the first Green elected to the House of Representatives, at the same time making Cunningham a marginal seat.

During his term, he was one of three Greens federal parliamentarians (with Senator Bob Brown and Senator Kerry Nettle).

=== Subsequent elections ===
Organ ran for a full term as member for Cunningham in the 2004 general election. He received 20.1% of the primary vote, placing third behind the Labor (39.6%) and Liberal (28.8%) candidates. This was a swing of 13.5% to the Greens compared to the 2001 federal election, but a 2.9% swing away from Organ compared to the 2002 by-election. Organ was eliminated on the ninth count, with his voters' preferences flowing overwhelmingly to Labor's Sharon Bird, allowing her to win with a 61.5% two-party-preferred vote.

He was again selected as the Greens candidate for Cunningham in the 2007 federal election, but failed to regain the seat from Bird, who was re-elected on first preferences. Organ won 14.6% of the primary vote.

For the 2022 election, Organ was preselected as Greens candidate for rural New South Wales seat of Riverina. The seat is a change from the coast, centred on the agricultural region of Riverina, including the towns Wagga Wagga and Parkes.

== Political positions ==
=== Sandon Point ===
In his first speech, Organ credited his win to community opposition to a planned development by the Stockland Trust Group at Sandon Point. The campaign included a tent embassy by the local Dharawal nation centred around the burial site of the Kuradji (similar to a shaman), and a community blockade of around 300 people which was confronted by a force of around sixty police officers and police dogs. Organ said that the development was inappropriate, threatened European and Indigenous cultural heritage, threatened wetlands and a green corridor.

=== Economy ===
Organ supports free tertiary education and opposes the privatisation of public utilities like Telstra, as well as what he calls "two decades of Canberra's obsession with economic rationalism".

=== Iraq war ===
In his first speech, Organ condemned the Iraq War as unjust, in breach of United Nations resolutions, and likely to lead to higher risks of terrorism.

=== Tibet ===
Organ co-authored a Greens policy on Tibet, which supported the right of Tibetans to self-determination and the Dalai Lama's Middle Way approach. He participated to the Save Tibet Asia Pacific Forum in Tokyo on 1–3 July 2008.

=== Marriage Equality ===
Organ was the only member of the House of Representatives to propose anti-discrimination amendments to the Howard Government's amendments to the Marriage Act in 2004.

== See also ==
- List of Australian Greens parliamentarians
- 2002 Cunningham by-election

Parliament of Australia
Preceded by Stephen Martin	Member for Cunningham; 2002–2004	Succeeded by Sharon Bird
