= Michael Baume =

Australian politician (born 1930)

The Honourable Michael Baume AO

Senator for New South Wales
- In office 1 July 1985 – 9 September 1996
- Succeeded by: Bill Heffernan

Member of the Australian Parliament for Macarthur
- In office 13 December 1975 – 5 March 1983
- Preceded by: John Kerin
- Succeeded by: Colin Hollis

Personal details
- Born: 6 July 1930 (age 96) Sydney, Australia
- Party: Liberal
- Relations: Frederick Baume (grandfather); Rosetta Baume (grandmother); Peter Baume (first cousin)
- Education: University of Sydney
- Occupation: Journalist; Stockbroker

Michael Ehrenfried Baume AO (born 6 July 1930) is a former Australian politician. A member of the Liberal Party, he served in the House of Representatives from 1975 to 1983 and as a Senator for New South Wales from 1985 to 1996. He was a parliamentary secretary in the Fraser government and was later a shadow minister. He was a business journalist and stockbroker before entering politics and later served as the Australian consul-general in New York City from 1996 to 2001.

== Early life and education ==
Baume was born in Sydney on 6 July 1930. He is the son of Elizabeth Constance (née Gibbons) and Alan Charles Baume. His father was a journalist and served in the Royal Australian Navy during World War II. His paternal grandfather Frederick Baume was a member of parliament in New Zealand, while his grandmother Rosetta Baume was one of the first women to stand for parliament in New Zealand.

Baume spent his early years in Dubbo, New South Wales, where his father was the editor of a weekly newspaper. The family later returned to Sydney and settled in Lindfield. Baume received his early education at Lindfield Public School and North Sydney Boys High School. He went on to graduate Bachelor of Arts from the University of Sydney in 1951.

== Early career ==
Baume joined the Australian Financial Review in 1954 as a business journalist and became the paper's investment editor in 1963. He moved to The Bulletin in 1966 as finance editor and was a music reviewer for The Daily Telegraph. In 1967, Baume published The Sydney Opera House Affair, a book detailing the controversies involved in the building's design and construction. He was also a finance commentator on ABC Radio for six years and appeared as a panellist on the ABC television game show Would You Believe? from 1970 to 1974.

In 1968, Baume began working as a research manager for Patrick Partners, Sydney's largest stockbroking firm. He became a staff partner the following year. The firm collapsed in July 1975, a few months before his election to parliament. He was also a director of meat exporter Tancred Brothers and Rothbury Estate, a winery in the Hunter Valley.

== Politics ==
Baume served as president of the Liberal Party's Shellharbour, New South Wales, branch from 1974 to 1975. He was also editor of one of the party's publications, The Australian Liberal.

=== House of Representatives ===
At the 1975 federal election, Baume won the seat of Macarthur for the Liberal Party from the incumbent Australian Labor Party MP John Kerin. He was re-elected at the 1977 and 1980 elections, but lost his seat to Labor candidate Colin Hollis at the 1983 election.

Baume served as parliamentary secretary to federal treasurer John Howard from 1982 to 1983. After his defeat he continued working for Howard as a senior adviser and was also elected to the New South Wales state executive of the Liberal Party.

=== Senate ===
In the 1984 election, Baume stood successfully as a Senate candidate in New South Wales. His term as Senator began on 1 July 1985, and he was re-elected in 1987 and 1993 before resigning from the Senate on 9 September 1996 to become Consul-General in New York (1996–2001).

== Later life ==
In New York, Baume was elected President of the Society of Foreign Consuls (1999–2001) and was awarded the medal of the Foreign Policy Association (New York) for services to US-Australian relations. On 9 June 1999, Baume was made an Officer of the Order of Australia, "for service to the arts and the development of cultural life in Australia and internationally, to the Australian parliament and to the financial services industry."

On his return to Australia, Baume was appointed a member of the Superannuation Complaints Tribunal for two years and was a foundation member of the Board of the United States Studies Centre at the University of Sydney. He was for many years a member of the Council of the Sydney Symphony Orchestra and for a decade was a regular columnist in The Australian Financial Review before moving to The Spectator Australia where his column appears monthly. He was for several years Special Counsel to former Sydney public relations and government relations firm, Wells Haslem Strategic Public Affairs Pty Ltd.

== See also ==
- List of Jewish members of the Australian parliament

Parliament of Australia
Preceded by John Kerin	Member for Macarthur; 1975–1983	Succeeded by Colin Hollis
Diplomatic posts
Preceded by Jim Humphreys	Australian Consul General in New York; 1996–2001	Succeeded by Ken Allen
