= Jennie George =

Australian politician (born 1947)

Jennie George AO
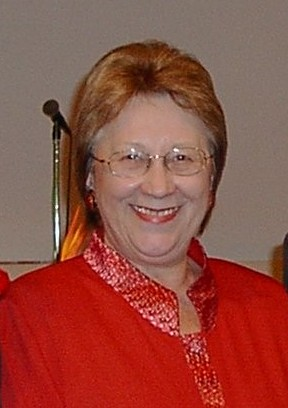

Member of the Australian Parliament for Throsby
- In office 10 November 2001 – 19 July 2010
- Preceded by: Colin Hollis
- Succeeded by: Stephen Jones

8th President of the ACTU
- In office 1996–2000
- Preceded by: Martin Ferguson
- Succeeded by: Sharan Burrow

Personal details
- Born: Eugenie Sinicky; 28 August 1947 (age 79) Trani, Italy
- Party: Labor
- Profession: Teacher, union official
- Website: jenniegeorge.com.au

Jennie George AO (born Eugenie Sinicky; 28 August 1947) is an Australian politician, and former Australian Labor Party member of the Australian House of Representatives from November 2001 to July 2010, representing the Division of Throsby, New South Wales.

== Early life ==
George was born in Trani, Italy, where her parents Oleg and Natasha were displaced persons from the Soviet Union. Oleg and Natasha separated in 1955 and divorced in 1958. Oleg died in 1960, aged 39, after years of heavy drinking and smoking, during which he was frequently violent towards his wife and sometimes his daughter. She was educated at the Burwood Girls High School (where she was first called Jennie, as Eugenie was deemed too hard to pronounce), Sydney University and the Sydney Teachers College.

In February 1968 she married Paddy George, a full-time activist for the Communist Party and NSW State Secretary of the Eureka Youth League, of which she was also a member. Jennie George was a secondary school teacher and an active member of the teachers' union.

George was elected General Secretary of the New South Wales Teachers Federation 1980–82.

== Career ==
George was Vice President of the Australian Council of Trade Unions (ACTU) in 1987, Assistant Secretary of the ACTU 1991–96 and President of the ACTU 1996–March 2000. She was the first woman to hold this position. She was Assistant National Director, Trade Union Training Authority 1989–91 and a board member of Delta Electricity from 2000 to 2001.

In November 1994 she was endorsed as the Left faction's candidate for a Victorian Senate seat. When Victorian Senator Olive Zakharov, also a member of the Left, was killed in a road accident in March 1995, it was assumed that George would be nominated to fill the casual vacancy. However, factional negotiations resulted in the seat going to a member of the Right faction, Jacinta Collins. George then withdrew her candidacy and did not reconsider a political career until returning to Sydney after leaving the ACTU. She sought support for a seat in either of the houses of the NSW Parliament, but this came to nothing. She was then offered a chance to stand for the federal seat of Throsby in New South Wales in 2001. She was inducted onto the Victorian Honour Roll of Women in 2001.

George served on the House of Representatives Standing Committee on Environment and Heritage from 20 March 2002, on the Standing Committee on Family and Community Services from 20 March 2002 to 31 August 2004 and on the Standing Committee on Family and Human Services from 2 December 2004. She was Shadow Parliamentary Secretary for Environment and Heritage from 2004 to 2007.

She retired from Parliament at the 2010 federal election.

Unlike other ACTU Presidents (including most notably former Prime Minister Bob Hawke) who went on to be elected to Federal Parliament, George did not hold a ministerial position during her federal parliamentary career.

She was made an Officer (AO) in the General Division of the Order of Australia on 10 June 2013.

Parliament of Australia
Preceded by Colin Hollis	Member for Throsby; 2001–2010	Succeeded by Stephen Jones
Trade union offices
Preceded by Martin Ferguson	President of the Australian Council of Trade Unions; 1996–2000	Succeeded by Sharan Burrow
