= Pat Farmer =

Australian marathon runner and politician

The Honourable Pat Farmer AM

Member of the Australian Parliament for Macarthur
- In office 10 November 2001 – 19 July 2010
- Preceded by: John Fahey
- Succeeded by: Russell Matheson

Personal details
- Born: Patrick Francis Daniel Farmer; 14 March 1962 (age 64) Sydney, New South Wales, Australia
- Party: Liberal
- Occupation: Ultra-marathon athlete, motivational speaker

Patrick Francis Daniel Farmer AM (born 14 March 1962) is an Australian ultra-marathon athlete, motivational speaker, and former politician. He served as a Member of the Australian House of Representatives, representing the seat of Macarthur in south-west Sydney from 2001 to 2010, as a member of the Liberal Party.

Farmer has an established reputation in international and national ultra-marathons. Between April 2011 and January 2012, Farmer successfully completed the world's longest ultra-marathon, a "Pole to Pole Run" from the North Pole to the South Pole, raising A$100,000 for Red Cross International. On 17 April 2023, Farmer set out from Hobart, Tasmania, to complete an 14,400 km run around Australia in support of the Indigenous Voice to Parliament.

== Early life and education ==
Patrick Francis Daniel Farmer was born on 14 March 1962 in the Sydney suburb of Ultimo, one of seven children to Mary and Frank Farmer. His grandfather migrated to Australia from Northern Ireland in 1927 primarily due to his Catholic faith in the majority-Protestant province. He grew up in Sydney's western suburbs, attending TAFE in Granville.

He started his working life as a motor mechanic, from 1977 to 1984.

== Running career and achievements ==
From 1984 to 2000, Farmer commenced his passion of ultra-marathon running while working with his brother Tony as a landscape gardener, and later as a motivational speaker.

During this period, Farmer set a number of ultra-marathon Australian and world records, which placed him in the elite of the sport. Before entering politics in 2001, he raised significant funds for Diabetes Australia, Lifeline, CareFlight and the Westmead Millennium Institute for Medical Research.

He is perhaps best known for his record-breaking 14,964-kilometre (9,298 mi) Centenary of Federation run around all of Australia in 1999, taking 191 days. (Note: The records were never ratified and are still held by Gary Parsons of Queensland.) This event raised considerable funds for charity.

=== 2011–2012: Pole to Pole Run ===
In his valedictory speech to Parliament on 23 June 2010, Pat Farmer formally announced his long-held goal of running from the North Pole to the South Pole, covering some 21,000 kilometres (13,000 mi), to raise funds for clean water programs for Red Cross International. Farmer departed the North Pole on 8 April 2011 and finished at the South Pole on 19 January 2012, raising A$100,000 for his efforts. Though the project is called "Pole to Pole" he had stages where he was allowed to take vehicles. Therefore, the record has never been ratified. In March 2012, John Howard launched Farmer's memoirs on the journey, called Pole to pole: one man, 20 million steps. Interviewed on Radio National Breakfast, Farmer stated that proceeds of book sales would go to Red Cross's campaign for clean water programs.

=== 2023: Run for the Voice ===
On 17 April 2023, Farmer set out from the capital of Tasmania, Hobart, beginning his 14,400-kilometre (8,900 mi) run around Australia. His goal is to raise awareness, support and engagement for the Indigenous Voice to Parliament, ahead of the referendum on the matter scheduled for later in the year. The marathon starts with a run in Tasmania, before Farmer flies to Perth and runs around the entire continent in a clockwise direction, finishing in Uluru in central Australia. He trained by running 40 km (25 mi) every single day, with a gym session most afternoons.

The launch was attended by prime minister Anthony Albanese.

== Political career ==
Following his ultra-marathon Centenary of Federation run in 1999, Farmer was approached by John Howard in 2000 and encouraged to seek Liberal endorsement for the Sydney-area seat of Division of Macarthur. The seat had been reconfigured to be a notional Labor seat after losing nearly all of its rural territory, but Farmer retained it for the Liberals on a swing of seven percent, and actually won enough primary votes to take the seat without the need for preferences. He was returned in 2004 with an increased margin.

During his time in Parliament, Farmer served on a range of House of Representatives committees including: Education and Training from 26 September 2002 to 31 August 2004; Communications, Information Technology and the Arts from 4 November 2003 to 31 August 2004. On 26 October 2004 he was appointed Parliamentary Secretary to the Minister for Education, Science and Training (with special responsibility for Western Sydney).

Farmer suffered a 10.43% swing against him at the 2007 federal election, in which the Howard government lost to Kevin Rudd's Labor Party. Farmer retained his seat with a margin of 0.7 percent, becoming the first opposition MP in the seat's history. After the election he was appointed the Shadow Minister for Youth and Sport.

In 2008 he moved to Mosman on Sydney's wealthy harbourside, far outside his electorate, against the advice of then Liberal Party leader Brendan Nelson, but stated that it would not affect his ability to represent his electorate in the city's southwestern suburbs. On 22 September he was dropped from the shadow ministry by the newly elected opposition leader Malcolm Turnbull. In August 2009 Farmer was reported to be considering standing for the New South Wales Legislative Assembly after a redistribution erased his already tenuous margin in Macarthur, making it notionally Labor.

In a Liberal Party pre-selection ballot for Macarthur held on 30 October 2009, Farmer was defeated by Russell Matheson, and retired from politics at the 2010 federal election..

On 2 February 2015, Farmer announced that he would be contesting the 2015 New South Wales state election as the Liberal candidate in Macquarie Fields, which included a small slice of his old federal seat. He got a significant boost from a redistribution that made the Labor-held seat notionally Liberal. However, he was defeated on a nearly 10-point swing by Labor candidate Anoulack Chanthivong.

Farmer unsuccessfully contested Maroubra as the Liberal candidate at the 2019 New South Wales state election.

Farmer was a candidate for the 2024 Central Coast Council election. He was not elected.

== Recognition ==
In 2000 Farmer was named Achiever of the Year at the Australian of the Year Awards, presented by prime minister John Howard.

In May 2000, he was awarded the Australian Sports Medal, as a "Multi-world record holder for ultra-marathon running & extremely successful charity fundraiser.

In the Queen's Birthday list in June 2015, he was made a Member of the Order of Australia, "For significant service to the community through fundraising support for charitable organisations, to ultra-marathon running, and to the Parliament of Australia".

== Personal life ==
In 1992, he married Lisa Bullivant, and they bought land in Catherine Field, where they began building their family home. They went on to have two children, Brooke and Dillon. In 1998, Lisa, aged 31, died unexpectedly of mitral valve prolapse and Farmer was left to raise his two children on his own. Pat married Tania Moran in 2014.

== Publications ==
- Farmer, Pat (April 2013). Pole to pole : one man, 20 million steps (paperback). Sydney: Allen & Unwin. p. 311. ISBN 978-1-74237-784-1.

== Footnotes ==
Parliament of Australia
| Preceded by John Fahey | Member for Macarthur; 2001–2010 | Succeeded by Russell Matheson |
