= Stephen Martin (Australian politician) =

Australian politician (born 1948)

The Honourable Stephen Martin AO

21st Speaker of the Australian House of Representatives
- In office 4 May 1993 – 29 January 1996
- Deputy: Harry Jenkins
- Preceded by: Leo McLeay
- Succeeded by: Bob Halverson

Member of the Australian Parliament for Cunningham
- In office 13 March 1993 – 16 August 2002
- Preceded by: Stewart West
- Succeeded by: Michael Organ

Member of the Australian Parliament for Macarthur
- In office 1 December 1984 – 13 March 1993
- Preceded by: Colin Hollis
- Succeeded by: Chris Haviland

Personal details
- Born: Stephen Paul Martin; 24 June 1948 (age 78) Wollongong, New South Wales, Australia
- Party: Australian Labor Party
- Occupation: Politician, teacher, lecturer, rugby league referee

Stephen Paul Martin AO (born 24 June 1948) is an Australian former politician, senior academic and rugby league referee. He is best known for having served as the 21st Speaker of the Australian House of Representatives from 1993 to 1996 during the second Keating government.

Born and raised in Wollongong, Martin served as an Australian Labor Party (ALP) Member of Parliament for the seat of Macarthur, in south west of Sydney and northern Wollongong, from 1984 to 1993; and, following redistribution, represented the Wollongong seat of Cunningham from 1993 until his resignation in 2002. Martin was the Chief Executive of the Committee for Economic Development of Australia (CEDA) from 2011 until his retirement in 2017.

== Early life ==
Martin was born on 24 June 1948 in Wollongong, New South Wales. He was the son of Vera Marion and Harold Edward Martin. His father was born in New Zealand.

Martin attended Wollongong High School. He went on to graduate Bachelor of Arts at the Australian National University in 1968 and subsequently completed a diploma in education at the University of New South Wales in 1969. He worked as a high school teacher from 1970 to 1973, then moved to Canada to study at the University of Alberta, graduating Master of Arts in 1974. After returning to Australia, Martin lectured in economics at the University of Wollongong until 1977, then worked for the Department of Planning and Environment as a town planner until his election to parliament. He was regional manager for the Macarthur Region. He completed the degree of Master of Town and Country Planning at the University of Sydney in 1982.

== Early political career ==
Martin was influenced to join the Australian Labor Party by the Whitlam government. He was an officeholder in the party's Balgownie and Wollongong branches. He also served on the Wollongong City Council from 1983 to 1985.

Martin was elected to parliament at the 1984 federal election, retaining the seat of Macarthur for the ALP. He was re-elected twice in Macarthur before transferring to Cunningham at the 1993 election following a redistribution. He was re-elected in Cunningham on three further occasions.

During the Hawke government, Martin served as chair of the House of Representatives Standing Committee on Finance and Public Administration from 1987 to 1991. The committee notably conducted an inquiry into deregulation of the banking industry, with its report titled A Pocket Full of Change released in 1991. Martin supported Paul Keating's leadership challenges in 1991. After the formation of the first Keating ministry he was appointed as a parliamentary secretary to foreign minister Gareth Evans.

== Speaker of the House, 1993–1996 ==
On 4 May 1993, Martin was elected speaker of the House in succession to Leo McLeay, who had resigned shortly before the 1993 election following a controversy over an injury compensation claim. He was the first speaker given the power to impose one-hour suspensions on members without a vote by the House. He unsuccessfully proposed the introduction of electronic voting in the House and was "widely seen as more informal than his predecessors".

Martin's tenure as speaker was marked by acrimonious and disorderly debates, in part attributed to Keating's combative parliamentary style. In March 1995, Keating made remarks to a caucus meeting implying that Martin had failed to control interjections from the opposition, to which Martin responded that the House could "vote me out" if they were unhappy with his performance.

== Later political career ==
Following the ALP's defeat at the 1996 election, Martin was elected to the shadow cabinet. He served under opposition leaders Kim Beazley and Simon Crean, holding the portfolios of veterans' affairs (1996–1997), sport and tourism (1996–1998), small business and customs (1997–1998), defence (1998–2001) and trade and tourism (2001–2002). During that time he completed a Ph.D. at the University of Wollongong with a thesis on financial deregulation by the Hawke and Keating governments.

Martin resigned from parliament on 16 August 2002, citing "political burnout". His seat was won by the Australian Greens candidate Michael Organ at the resulting by-election.

== After politics ==
After a period as President of the University of Wollongong campus in Dubai, Martin took the position of Pro Vice-Chancellor (International) at Victoria University in Melbourne in January 2005. His major contributions were to transform Victoria University's international operations and to create Victoria University International (VUI) as a unit of the university.

In March 2008 Martin became Deputy Vice Chancellor (Strategy and Planning) at Curtin University of Technology in Perth. In April 2009 he took up the position of Senior Consultant with the Slade Group in Melbourne.

In June 2010, Martin joined the Southern Cross University Graduate College of Management in the role of Professor of Business Research and director of the Doctor of Business Administration (DBA) program and left in November 2010.

Martin was appointed to the Chief Executive of the Committee for Economic Development of Australia (CEDA) on 1 January 2011.

In June 2022, Martin was appointed Officer of the Order of Australia in the 2022 Queen's Birthday Honours for "distinguished service to the people and Parliament of Australia, to charitable organisations, and to regional sport and education".

== Personal life ==
Martin had four children.

Martin had a long career as a rugby league referee and administrator. In 1984 he refereed the Illawarra Rugby League first-grade grand final, a feat that was subsequently acknowledged in Hansard. He served terms as treasurer and secretary of the Referees' Association.

In 1989, Martin was appointed as a director of the Illawarra Steelers. He resigned from the board in 1996 in protest over the sacking of coach Graham Murray and the club's refusal to open talks with News Limited during the Super League War.

Parliament of Australia
Preceded by Colin Hollis	Member for Macarthur; 1984–1993	Succeeded by Chris Haviland
Preceded by Stewart West	Member for Cunningham; 1993–2002	Succeeded by Michael Organ
Preceded by Leo McLeay	Speaker of the Australian House of Representatives; 1993–1996	Succeeded by Bob Halverson
