= Russell Matheson =

Australian politician

Member of the Australian Parliament for Macarthur
- In office 21 August 2010 – 2 July 2016
- Preceded by: Pat Farmer
- Succeeded by: Mike Freelander

Personal details
- Born: 16 December 1958 (age 67) Brisbane, Australia
- Party: Liberal Party of Australia
- Spouse: Sharon
- Children: 2
- Occupation: Police officer
- Website: Liberal People: Russell Matheson

Russell Glenn Matheson (born 16 December 1958) is a former Australian politician who served as a Member of the Australian House of Representatives for the seat of Macarthur representing the Liberal Party of Australia from August 2010 to July 2016. The seat was previously held by Liberal Pat Farmer, who lost Liberal pre-selection and retired from politics.

Matheson lost the seat in the 2016 federal election to Labor candidate Mike Freelander with an 11.7% swing.

== Early years and background ==
Prior to entering politics, Matheson was a Sergeant in the New South Wales Police Force, with 23 years experience, and former local Australian football champion. He served 17 years on Council of the City of Campbelltown, including five years as Mayor as an independent.

== Politics ==
Matheson defeated Farmer for Liberal preselection in Macarthur. The seat had been made notionally Labor with a 0.5-point two-party-preferred margin in the electoral redistribution prior to the 2010 election, however Matheson won with a notional 3.5-point swing to finish on a 3-point margin.

After the 2010 election, it was revealed that Matheson failed to resign from his position on the Campbelltown Council before the election, putting himself at risk of High Court action, which would not allow him to take office as the member for Macarthur. Previously, independent Phil Cleary and Liberal Jackie Kelly have been faced with a by-election after failing to resign from public service positions before winning their respective seats.

Parliament of Australia
Preceded by Pat Farmer	Member for Macarthur; 2010–2016	Succeeded by Mike Freelander
