= Balgownie =

Balgownie may refer to:

- Balgownie, New South Wales
- Brig o' Balgownie, Aberdeen
- Balgownie Wood, Fife
- Balgonie Castle, Fife
