= Mike Freelander =

Australian politician and pediatrician (born 1953)

Mike Freelander MP FRACP MBBS

Member of the Australian Parliament for Macarthur
- Incumbent
- Assumed office 2 July 2016
- Preceded by: Russell Matheson

Personal details
- Born: 23 April 1953 (age 73) Sydney, Australia
- Citizenship: Australian
- Party: Labor
- Spouse: Sharon
- Children: Six
- Education: University of Sydney
- Occupation: Paediatrician
- Website: www.drmikefreelander.com.au

Michael Randolph Freelander (born 23 April 1953) is an Australian politician and paediatrician. Freelander has been a paediatrician since 1978, and a member of the Australian Labor Party (ALP). Freelander has represented the Division of Macarthur, winning and holding the seat since the 2016 federal election the elections since.

== Early life ==
Freelander was born in Sydney. His father Selwyn was a dentist and president of West Harbour RFC, while his mother Ruth was a preschool teacher. His paternal grandfather William Freelander arrived in Australia as a cabin boy and became mayor of Katoomba and the City of Blue Mountains. Freelander attended Trinity Grammar School from 1965 to 1970, playing cricket and rugby and being appointed a prefect of the school. In the Higher School Certificate he qualified to study medicine at Sydney University.

== Medical career ==
Freelander studied medicine at the University of Sydney and is a Fellow of the Royal Australasian College of Physicians (FRACP). He trained as a paediatrician at the Royal Alexandra Hospital for Children. In 1984 he moved to the Macarthur region of Sydney and established his own practice, also working at Camden and Campbelltown Hospitals for several decades. He additionally lectured at the University of Western Sydney.

Freelander became the head of Paediatrics at Campbelltown Hospital from 1986 to 2013.

Freelander needed to resign from his job in order to satisfy Section 44(iv.) of the Constitution, which prohibits a person holding any office of profit under the Crown from becoming a member of parliament.

After being elected in 2016, Freelander has continued to volunteer at Campbelltown Hospital, seeing both old and new patients from the Macarthur region. Freelander has seen over 200,000 patients over his medical career.

== Politics ==
Freelander was elected to parliament at the 2016 federal election, defeating sitting Liberal member Russell Matheson in the Division of Macarthur. He was assisted by a favourable redistribution. He became the first Labor MP to hold Macarthur since the Keating government lost the 1996 election, and gained increased majorities, after preference distribution, at the 2019, 2022 and 2025 elections.

He has championed several local health issues, such as obesity, for which he has advocated a sugar tax. The Appin Road upgrade for which he advocated in Parliament, became a $170 million project, including a koala underpass by 2024.

=== Committees ===
Freelander has been Chair of the House of Representatives Standing Committee on Health, Aged Care and Disability since August 2025. He also serves on the House of Representatives Standing Committees on Agriculture, and on Primary Industries, and on the Joint Statutory Committee on Human Rights.

He formerly served on the Standing Committee for Health, Aged Care and Sport from 2016 to 2025, serving as its Deputy Chair from 2019 to 2022 and its Chair from 2022 to 2025. He also served on the Standing Committees for Social Policy and Legal Affairs from 2016 to 2022, and for Selection from 2022 to 2025.

He served on the Joint Standing Committees for Northern Australia in 2016, for the Parliamentary Library from 2016 to 2019, and for the National Disability Insurance Scheme from 2022 to 2025.

== Personal life ==
Freelander has six children with his wife Sharon, and had five grandchildren as of 2016. He has said that he is "not a particularly religious Jew, but I still describe myself as Jewish".

Parliament of Australia
Preceded by Russell Matheson	Member for Macarthur; 2016–present	Incumbent
