= Division of Macarthur =

Australian federal electoral division

Coordinates: 34.065°S 150.764°E

Macarthur Australian House of Representatives Division
- Interactive map of electorate boundaries from the 2025 federal election
- Created: 1949
- MP: Mike Freelander
- Party: Labor
- Namesake: John and Elizabeth Macarthur
- Electors: 115,039 (2025)
- Area: 307 km^{2} (118.5 sq mi)
- Demographic: Outer metropolitan
Electorates around Macarthur:
Hume	Werriwa	Hughes
Hume	Macarthur	Hughes
Hume	Hume	Cunningham

The Division of Macarthur is an Australian electoral division in the state of New South Wales.

It is centred on Campbelltown in the Macarthur region within South Western Sydney. Since 2016 its Member of Parliament (MP) has been Mike Freelander of the Australian Labor Party.

== History ==
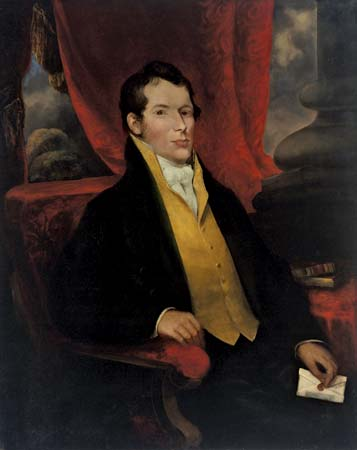
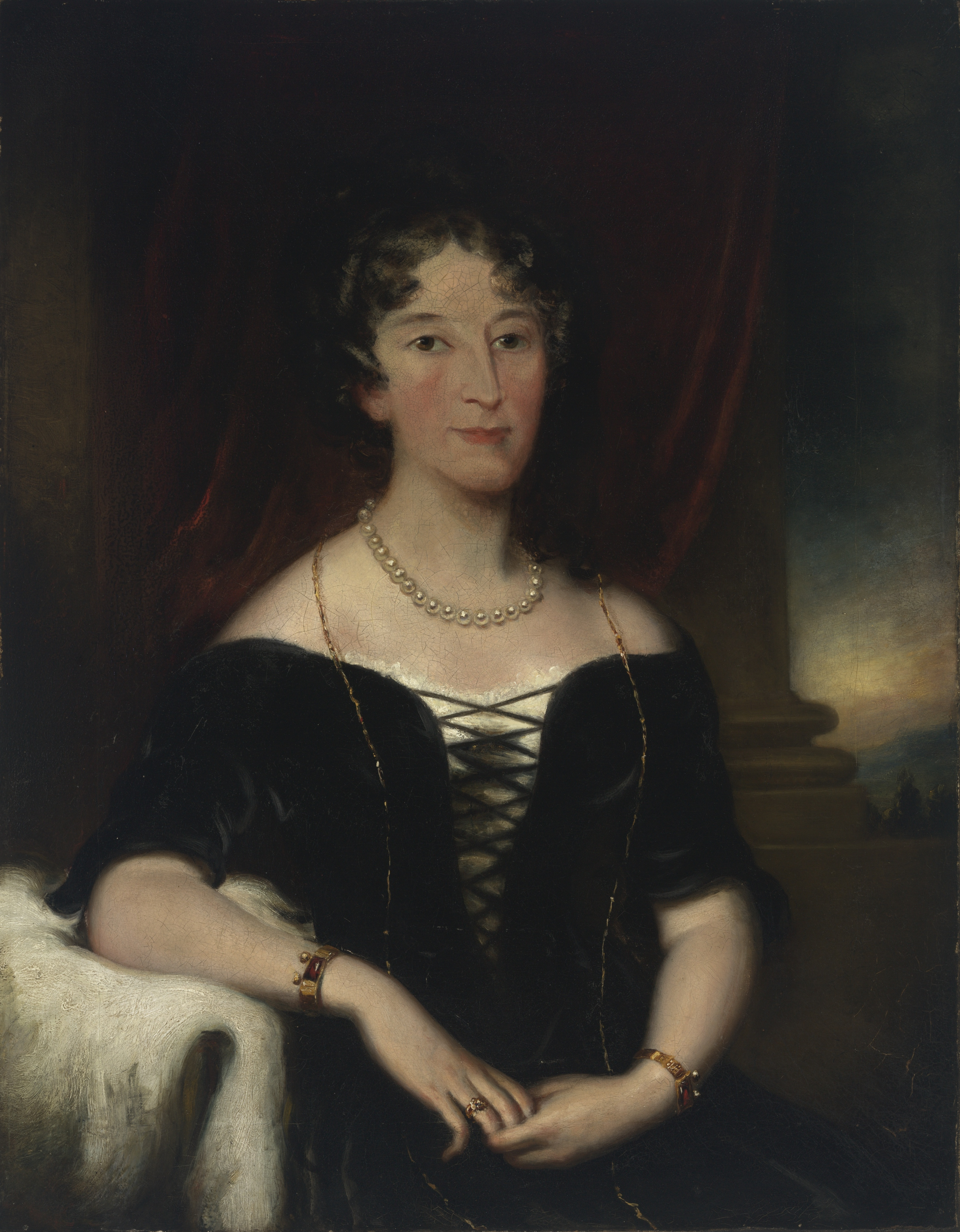
John and Elizabeth Macarthur, the division's namesakes

The division is named after John Macarthur and his wife Elizabeth, who were both pioneers of Australia's wool industry. The main products and work in the electorate are in the fruit and vegetable production, lucerne and fodder crops, wine, dairy cattle and horse-breeding.

Macarthur has changed hands regularly over the years as redistributions have favoured different parties. Macarthur was a bellwether seat from the time of its establishment in 1949 until the 2007 election—during that 58-year period it was always held by a member of the governing party or coalition. Originally a hybrid urban-rural seat stretching from southwest Sydney to the Southern Highlands and the South Coast, successive redistributions have shrunk the geographical size of the seat due to the rapid growth of the Campbelltown area. In the redistribution prior to the 2001 federal election, Southern Highlands towns such as Bowral and Moss Vale were removed, shrinking the seat to one eighth of its original size and making it an entirely Sydney-based seat. This made the seat notionally Labor by 1.3%, from the previous 5.6% of the Liberals, prompting Liberal minister and former New South Wales premier John Fahey to retire. However, his replacement as Liberal candidate, former ultra-marathoner, Pat Farmer, achieved an 8.3-point swing to retain the seat for the Liberals, actually tallying a primary vote large enough to win without the need for preferences. He increased the margin from 7 to 9.5 points at the 2004 election.

Ahead of the 2007 election, a redistribution seemingly consolidated Farmer's hold on the seat; the Liberal majority was boosted to 11.1%. However, Farmer was nearly defeated in the election, suffering a swing of 10.4 points. The swing was spread evenly across the electorate, reflecting its solid mortgage-belt character. The swing was particularly large in the heavily mortgaged suburbs of Narellan, Camden and the traditionally more Labor-voting areas of Campbelltown. Farmer's margin was reduced to an extremely marginal 0.7 points. A further redistribution in 2010 made it notionally a Labor seat. Farmer was defeated for Liberal preselection by Campbelltown mayor Russell Matheson, who was able to retain the seat for the Liberals. Matheson gained a large swing at the 2013 election, increasing the Liberal margin to 11.1 points. The Liberal margin was reduced to just 3.3 points in the redistribution before the 2016 election, and additionally, a ReachTEL poll of 628 voters conducted in Macarthur during the election campaign saw Labor leading the Liberals. At the 2016 election Labor challenger Mike Freelander took the seat off the Liberals on a swing of just under 12 points, ending the Liberals' 20-year hold on the seat and turning it into a safe Labor seat at one stroke. Freelander actually won enough votes on the first count to defeat Matheson without the need for preferences.

Ahead of the 2016 federal election, ABC psephologist Antony Green listed the seat in his election guide as one of eleven which he classed as bellwether electorates.

== Boundaries ==
Since 1984 federal electoral division boundaries in Australia have been determined at redistributions by a redistribution committee appointed by the Australian Electoral Commission. Redistributions occur for the boundaries of divisions in a particular state, and they occur every seven years, or sooner if a state's representation entitlement changes or when divisions of a state are malapportioned.

When the division was created in 1949, it covered a large area that consisted of the outskirts of Sydney and rural areas outside of Sydney. Within Sydney, it covered areas in Western Sydney such as Penrith (partially), South Penrith and Emu Plains, as well as areas south and west of Liverpool, such as Bringelly, Camden and Campbelltown. Outside Sydney, it covered areas in the Lower Blue Mountains, the Southern Highlands and South Coast, extending up to Wentworth Falls in the west and the Jervis Bay Territory in the south. These areas were previously part of the divisions of Werriwa (south-west Sydney and Southern Highlands), Macquarie (Lower Blue Mountains and Penrith) and Eden-Monaro (South Coast).

The division lost the Blue Mountains and Penrith areas in 1968, before losing the Campbelltown area to Werriwa in 1977. In the 1984 redistribution, the division lost its southern two-thirds to form the new divisions of Throsby and Gilmore. These areas included the parts of Southern Highlands and all of South Coast, though the division gained some areas in northern Wollongong and regained some areas surrounding Campbelltown (but not including). As a result, the division was significantly shrunk to cover south-western Sydney and its surroundings in the Southern Highlands, and northern Wollongong.

The division then lost the remainder of the Wollongong area to the Cunningham in the 1992 redistribution. In that same redistribution, the division also regained some areas in the Southern Highlands from the shrunken Throsby. It lost these areas to the Division of Hume in 2000, but regained Campbelltown from Werriwa in the same redistribution.

Since 2000, the division gradually got smaller and started shifting to centre around the Campbelltown area. Since 2025, it is located in outer south-west Sydney and covering 307 square kilometres (119 sq mi), the present boundaries of the division cover the southern suburbs of Campbelltown and parts of the local government area of Camden. It encompasses the suburbs of Airds, Ambarvale, Blair Athol, Blairmount, Bow Bowing, Bradbury, Campbelltown, Claymore, Currans Hill, Denham Court, Eagle Vale, Englorie Park, Eschol Park, Gilead, Gledswood Hills, Glen Alpine, Gregory Hills, Kearns, Kentlyn, Leumeah, Menangle Park, Minto, Minto Heights, Raby, Rosemeadow, Ruse, Smeaton Grange, St Andrews, St Helens Park, Varroville, Wedderburn and Woodbine.

The electorate is predominantly outer-suburban, but contains some rural areas. The population of the electorate is likely to expand significantly over coming years due to the release of new land surrounding Sydney for residential development.

== Demographics ==
The division is a mortgage belt area, with a high percentage of young families, leading to the proportion of residents under 18 being 35%, compared to the national average of 27.2%, with a low proportion of senior citizens (5.9% compared to 12.1%). This is further highlighted in the fact that 23.3% of the population is attending school, compared to the national average of 18.1%. The income is above average, with 19.7% of the families in the electorate earning less than A$500 per week, compared to 24.3% for the national average. The birth demographics of the electorate are similar to the rest of Australia, with the proportion of people born overseas and in non-English speaking countries within one percentage point of the national average.

== Members ==
Image	Member	Party	Term	Notes
	Jeff Bate (1906–1984)	Liberal	10 December 1949 – 9 October 1972	Previously held the New South Wales Legislative Assembly seat of Wollondilly. Lost preselection and then lost seat
	Jeff Bate (1906–1984)	Independent Liberal	9 October 1972 – 2 December 1972	Previously held the New South Wales Legislative Assembly seat of Wollondilly. Lost preselection and then lost seat
	John Kerin (1937–2023)	Labor	2 December 1972 – 13 December 1975	Lost seat. Later elected to the Division of Werriwa in 1978
	Michael Baume (1930–)	Liberal	13 December 1975 – 5 March 1983	Lost seat. Later elected to the Senate in 1984
	Colin Hollis (1938–)	Labor	5 March 1983 – 1 December 1984	Transferred to the Division of Throsby
	Stephen Martin (1948–)	Labor	1 December 1984 – 13 March 1993	Transferred to the Division of Cunningham
	Chris Haviland (1952–)	Labor	13 March 1993 – 29 January 1996	Lost preselection and retired
	John Fahey (1945–2020)	Liberal	2 March 1996 – 8 October 2001	Previously held the New South Wales Legislative Assembly seat of Southern Highlands. Previously served as the Premier of New South Wales from 1992 to 1995. Served as minister under Howard. Retired
	Pat Farmer (1962–)	Liberal	10 November 2001 – 19 July 2010	Lost preselection and retired
	Russell Matheson (1958–)	Liberal	21 August 2010 – 2 July 2016	Lost seat
	Mike Freelander (1953–)	Labor	2 July 2016 – present	Incumbent

== Election results ==
2025 Australian federal election: Macarthur
Party	Candidate	Votes	%	±%
Labor	Mike Freelander	45,080	48.20	+1.33
Liberal	Binod Paudel	21,593	23.09	−6.22
Greens	Frankie Scott	12,012	12.84	+5.01
One Nation	Gregory Grogan	7,336	7.84	−0.14
Family First	Graham Charlesworth	3,690	3.95	+3.95
Libertarian	Connie Harvey	2,443	2.61	+0.47
Fusion	Edward Palmer	1,382	1.48	+1.48
Total formal votes		93,536	90.18	−2.44
Informal votes		10,188	9.82	+2.44
Turnout		103,724	90.19	+7.03
Two-party-preferred result
Labor	Mike Freelander	61,365	65.61	+5.85
Liberal	Binod Paudel	32,171	34.39	−5.85
Labor hold		Swing	+5.85	
