= Chris Haviland =

Australian politician (born 1952)

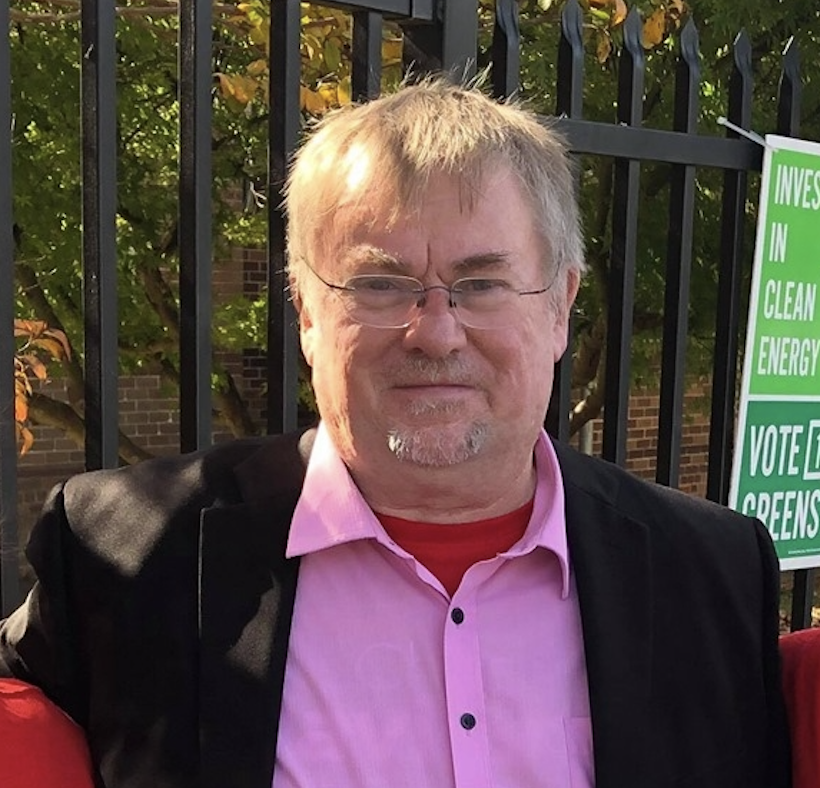

Member of the Australian Parliament for Macarthur
- In office 13 March 1993 – 29 January 1996
- Preceded by: Stephen Martin
- Succeeded by: John Fahey

Personal details
- Born: 27 February 1952 (age 74) Sydney, Australia
- Party: Australian Labor Party
- Relations: Stanley Haviland (great uncle)

Christopher Douglas Haviland (born 27 February 1952) is an Australian politician. Born in Sydney, he has worked as a public servant with the Commonwealth Department of Health, a teacher, a maths tutor and an umpire for Sydney Grade Cricket. He was a district cricketer in Sydney and Perth. He is a leading activist for party democratisation and is an active member of the progressive Left faction. He is the New South Wales State Convenor of grassroots party reform organisation Local Labor. Since 2014, Chris Haviland has been an active member of the New South Wales Labor Party Administrative Committee and a former President of the Hawkesbury Branch of the Australian Labor Party.

== Local government ==
In 1987, Haviland was elected to Campbelltown City Council.

In 1991, he was elected to the Executive of the NSW Local Government Association.

== Federal politics ==
In 1993, Haviland was elected to the Australian House of Representatives as the Labor member for Macarthur, succeeding Stephen Martin, who contested Cunningham instead. In 1996, however, he lost his Labor endorsement and retired from politics.

Haviland was also a two-time Labor candidate for the safe Liberal seat of Bradfield. In the 2019 Australian federal election Haviland achieved 33.4% on the two-party preferred vote and a 4.5% swing which was notably the highest swing to the Australian Labor Party in any electorate within NSW.

Parliament of Australia
Preceded by Stephen Martin	Member for Macarthur; 1993–1996	Succeeded by John Fahey
