= Colin Hollis =

Australian politician (born 1938)

Member of the Australian Parliament for Macarthur
- In office 5 March 1983 – 1 December 1984
- Preceded by: Michael Baume
- Succeeded by: Stephen Martin

Member of the Australian Parliament for Throsby
- In office 1 December 1984 – 8 October 2001
- Preceded by: New seat
- Succeeded by: Jennie George

Personal details
- Born: 30 May 1938 (age 88) Wauchope, New South Wales, Australia
- Party: Labor
- Spouse: Gordon Streek (d. 2021)
- Education: University of London; Open University; University of New England

Colin Hollis (born 30 May 1938) is a retired Australian politician. He was a member of the House of Representatives from 1983 to 2001, representing the Australian Labor Party (ALP).

== Early life ==
Hollis was born on 30 May 1938 in Wauchope, New South Wales. He holds the degrees of Bachelor of Arts from the Open University and Bachelor of Science (Hons.) from the University of London, where he studied economics. He also holds a diploma in international affairs from the University of London and a diploma in continuing education from the University of New England. He was a regional director of the Workers' Educational Association before entering parliament.

== Politics ==
Hollis was secretary of the Jamberoo branch of the Australian Labor Party (ALP) from 1977 to 1983. He was elected to parliament at the 1983 federal election, winning the seat of Macarthur from the incumbent Liberal MP Michael Baume. After a redistribution in 1984 that transferred most of Illawarra and all of the South Coast from Macarthur to the new seat of Throsby, he switched to Throsby at the election that year. He represented the seat until his retirement prior to the 2001 election.

Hollis was a deputy chairman of committees from 1989 to 1994 and served on the speaker's panel from 1994 to 2001. He served on a number of parliamentary committees, including as chair of the Parliamentary Standing Committee on Public Works from 1987 to 1996, and participated in a number of parliamentary delegations overseas. In 1995, he was made a commander of the Order of the Lion of Finland for services to Australia–Finland relations.

In parliament, Hollis was a member of the Labor Left faction. In 1987 he became the founding chairman of Australian Parliamentarians Against Apartheid. In 1994 he publicly opposed the Keating government's program of privatisation. Hollis faced challenges for preselection on several occasions, both from the Labor Right faction and from within his own faction. In 1994 he accused the right faction of branch stacking in his electorate using members of the Macedonian community.

== Personal life ==
Hollis married his long-term partner Gordon Streek, a community theatre director, a few years before Streek's death in 2021. In 2001, he lodged an unsuccessful discrimination case against the federal government in the Human Rights and Equal Opportunity Commission over its failure to reimburse travel costs for the same-sex partners of MPs when travelling with the MP on official Parliamentary duties.

Hollis is prominent in rose-growing circles and has served as president of the NSW Rose Society and the National Rose Society of Australia. He was awarded the Australian Rose Award in 2019. Hollis has been involved in creating, and maintaining, the rose beds in Peace Park Kiama, and is currently the co-ordinator of the Volunteers of Peace.

Over recent years he has worked closely with Mrs Linda Hurley in obtaining a rose to honour the wives of the governors of NSW (The Governors' Wife Rose) and more recently a rose to honour the wives of Australian governors-general (The Lady of Australia Rose).

Parliament of Australia
Preceded by Michael Baume	Member for Macarthur; 1983 – 1984	Succeeded by Stephen Martin
New division	Member for Throsby; 1984 – 2001	Succeeded by Jennie George
