= Electoral results for the Division of Cowper =

Australian division election results

This is a list of electoral results for the Division of Cowper in Australian federal elections from the electorate's creation in 1901 until the present.

== Members ==
Member	Party	Term
Francis Clarke	Protectionist	1901–1903
Henry Lee	Free Trade, Anti-Socialist	1903–1906
John Thomson	Protectionist	1906–1909
John Thomson	Liberal	1909–1916
John Thomson	Nationalist	1916–1919
(Sir) Earle Page	Country	1919–1961
Frank McGuren	Labor	1961–1963
Ian Robinson	Country, National	1963–1984
Garry Nehl	National	1984–2001
Luke Hartsuyker	National	2001–2019
Pat Conaghan	National	2019–present

== Election results ==
=== Elections in the 2020s ===
==== 2025 ====
2025 Australian federal election: Cowper
Party	Candidate	Votes	%	±%
Labor	Greg Vigors			
Independent	Zeke Daley			
Legalise Cannabis	Megan Mathew			
Trumpet of Patriots	Geoffrey Shannon			
National	Pat Conaghan			
Libertarian	Paul Templeton			
Family First	Peter Jackel			
Greens	Wendy Firefly			
Independent	Caz Heise			
Fusion	Geoffrey Marlow			
One Nation	Chris Walsh			
Total formal votes				
Informal votes				
Turnout				

==== 2022 ====
2022 Australian federal election: Cowper
Party	Candidate	Votes	%	±%
National	Pat Conaghan	43,909	39.47	−7.60
Independent	Caz Heise	29,206	26.26	+26.26
Labor	Keith McMullen	15,566	13.99	+0.20
One Nation	Faye Aspiotis	9,047	8.13	+8.13
Greens	Timothy Nott	6,518	5.86	−0.08
Liberal Democrats	Simon Chaseling	4,316	3.88	+3.88
United Australia	Joshua Fairhall	2,674	2.40	−0.62
Total formal votes		111,236	95.07	+2.85
Informal votes		5,770	4.93	−2.85
Turnout		117,006	90.22	−1.81
Notional two-party-preferred count
National	Pat Conaghan	66,153	59.47	−2.41
Labor	Keith McMullen	45,083	40.53	+2.41
Two-candidate-preferred result
National	Pat Conaghan	58,204	52.32	−4.47
Independent	Caz Heise	53,032	47.68	+47.68
National hold				

Alluvial diagram for preference flows in the seat of Cowper in the 2022 federal election. indicates at what stage the winning candidate had over 50% of the votes and was declared the winner.

=== Elections in the 2010s ===
==== 2019 ====
2019 Australian federal election: Cowper
Party	Candidate	Votes	%	±%
National	Pat Conaghan	49,668	47.07	+1.10
Independent	Rob Oakeshott	25,847	24.49	−1.80
Labor	Andrew Woodward	14,551	13.79	+0.18
Greens	Lauren Edwards	6,264	5.94	−0.73
United Australia	Alexander Stewart	3,188	3.02	+3.02
Christian Democrats	Ruth Meads	2,383	2.26	−1.16
Animal Justice	Kellie Pearce	2,176	2.06	+2.06
Independent	Allan Green	1,451	1.37	+1.37
Total formal votes		105,528	92.22	−2.63
Informal votes		8,898	7.78	+2.63
Turnout		114,426	92.03	−0.20
Notional two-party-preferred count
National	Pat Conaghan	65,302	61.88	−0.70
Labor	Andrew Woodward	40,266	38.12	+0.70
Two-candidate-preferred result
National	Pat Conaghan	59,932	56.79	+2.23
Independent	Rob Oakeshott	45,596	43.21	−2.23
National hold		Swing	+2.23	

==== 2016 ====
2016 Australian federal election: Cowper
Party	Candidate	Votes	%	±%
National	Luke Hartsuyker	47,559	45.97	−8.10
Independent	Rob Oakeshott	27,200	26.29	+26.29
Labor	Damian Wood	14,079	13.61	−9.97
Greens	Carol Vernon	6,901	6.67	−3.89
Christian Democrats	Wayne Lawrence	3,538	3.42	+0.95
Independent	John Arkan	3,457	3.34	+3.34
Citizens Electoral Council	Michael Gough	726	0.70	+0.70
Total formal votes		103,460	94.85	+0.37
Informal votes		5,613	5.15	−0.37
Turnout		109,073	92.23	−0.78
Notional two-party-preferred count
National	Luke Hartsuyker	64,743	62.58	−0.65
Labor	Damian Wood	38,717	37.42	+0.65
Two-candidate-preferred result
National	Luke Hartsuyker	56,443	54.56	−13.15
Independent	Rob Oakeshott	47,017	45.44	+45.44
National hold		Swing	N/A	

==== 2013 ====
2013 Australian federal election: Cowper
Party	Candidate	Votes	%	±%
National	Luke Hartsuyker	45,820	53.05	+2.28
Labor	Alfredo Navarro	21,910	25.37	−2.45
Greens	Carol Vernon	10,685	12.37	+3.28
Palmer United	Rodney Jeanneret	5,739	6.64	+6.64
Christian Democrats	Bethany McAlpine	2,224	2.57	+0.18
Total formal votes		86,378	94.72	−0.95
Informal votes		4,813	5.28	+0.95
Turnout		91,191	93.86	−0.19
Two-party-preferred result
National	Luke Hartsuyker	53,303	61.71	+2.44
Labor	Alfredo Navarro	33,075	38.29	−2.44
National hold		Swing	+2.44	

==== 2010 ====
2010 Australian federal election: Cowper
Party	Candidate	Votes	%	±%
National	Luke Hartsuyker	43,242	50.77	+4.22
Labor	Paul Sekfy	23,696	27.82	−10.25
Independent	John Arkan	8,446	9.92	+9.92
Greens	Dominic King	7,745	9.09	−1.95
Christian Democrats	Deborah Lions	2,039	2.39	−0.48
Total formal votes		85,168	95.67	−0.36
Informal votes		3,857	4.33	+0.36
Turnout		89,025	94.06	−1.02
Two-party-preferred result
National	Luke Hartsuyker	50,477	59.27	+8.03
Labor	Paul Sekfy	34,691	40.73	−8.03
National hold		Swing	+8.03	

=== Elections in the 2000s ===
==== 2007 ====
2007 Australian federal election: Cowper
Party	Candidate	Votes	%	±%
National	Luke Hartsuyker	39,444	46.54	−3.92
Labor	Paul Sekfy	32,276	38.08	+6.43
Greens	John Carty	9,359	11.04	+2.15
Christian Democrats	Deborah Lions	2,428	2.86	+2.86
Family First	Flavia Arapi-Nunez	759	0.90	+0.70
Liberty & Democracy	Leon Belgrave	491	0.58	+0.58
Total formal votes		84,757	96.02	+0.36
Informal votes		3,510	3.98	−0.36
Turnout		88,267	95.15	+0.48
Two-party-preferred result
National	Luke Hartsuyker	43,423	51.23	−5.52
Labor	Paul Sekfy	41,334	48.77	+5.52
National hold		Swing	−5.52	

==== 2004 ====
2004 Australian federal election: Cowper
Party	Candidate	Votes	%	±%
National	Luke Hartsuyker	38,998	50.20	+20.31
Labor	Allan Williams	24,873	32.02	−0.29
Greens	John Carty	7,239	9.32	+3.80
One Nation	Allan Stokes	3,098	3.99	−3.07
Lower Excise Fuel	Norm Mann	2,007	2.58	−0.02
Democrats	Trevor Kapeen	1,468	1.89	−0.82
Total formal votes		77,683	95.96	+0.07
Informal votes		3,273	4.04	−0.07
Turnout		80,956	95.19	−0.12
Two-party-preferred result
National	Luke Hartsuyker	43,853	56.45	+1.72
Labor	Allan Williams	33,830	43.55	−1.72
National hold		Swing	+1.72	

==== 2001 ====
2001 Australian federal election: Cowper
Party	Candidate	Votes	%	±%
Labor	Jenny Bonfield	23,615	32.31	−1.90
National	Luke Hartsuyker	21,846	29.89	−11.87
Liberal	Philip Neuss	11,663	15.95	+15.95
One Nation	Allan Stokes	5,164	7.06	−7.18
Greens	Jillian Cranny	4,033	5.52	+1.48
Democrats	Michael Fenton	1,978	2.71	−0.71
Lower Excise Fuel	John Maguire	1,904	2.60	+2.60
Christian Democrats	Bruce Korn	1,472	2.01	+1.79
Independent	John Willey	973	1.33	+1.33
Independent	Paul van Bladel	452	0.62	+0.62
Total formal votes		73,100	95.89	−1.34
Informal votes		3,131	4.11	+1.34
Turnout		76,231	96.05	
Two-party-preferred result
National	Luke Hartsuyker	40,006	54.73	−0.98
Labor	Jenny Bonfield	33,094	45.27	+0.98
National hold		Swing	−0.98	

=== Elections in the 1990s ===
==== 1998 ====
1998 Australian federal election: Cowper
Party	Candidate	Votes	%	±%
National	Garry Nehl	30,810	42.01	−14.28
Labor	Paul Sekfy	24,213	33.02	+1.03
One Nation	John Willey	11,234	15.32	+15.32
Greens	Jillian Cranny	2,960	4.04	−2.20
Democrats	Paul Anthony Corben	2,570	3.50	−1.98
Independent	Mark Spencer	1,550	2.11	+2.11
Total formal votes		73,337	97.26	−0.44
Informal votes		2,068	2.74	+0.44
Turnout		75,405	95.19	−0.99
Two-party-preferred result
National	Garry Nehl	41,335	56.36	−5.20
Labor	Paul Sekfy	32,002	43.64	+5.20
National hold		Swing	−5.20	

==== 1996 ====
1996 Australian federal election: Cowper
Party	Candidate	Votes	%	±%
National	Garry Nehl	40,825	56.30	+8.24
Labor	Paul Sekfy	23,195	31.98	−7.12
Greens	Jillian Cranny	4,525	6.24	+1.56
Democrats	Allan Quartly	3,974	5.48	+1.89
Total formal votes		72,519	97.70	−0.13
Informal votes		1,709	2.30	+0.13
Turnout		74,228	96.19	+0.37
Two-party-preferred result
National	Garry Nehl	44,465	61.56	+7.50
Labor	Paul Sekfy	27,766	38.44	−7.50
National hold		Swing	+7.50	

==== 1993 ====
1993 Australian federal election: Cowper
Party	Candidate	Votes	%	±%
National	Garry Nehl	32,772	48.05	+2.10
Labor	Paul Sekfy	26,670	39.10	+6.97
Greens	Jillian Cranny	3,191	4.68	+2.30
Democrats	Trevor Pike	2,448	3.59	−6.62
Confederate Action	Darrel Wallbridge	1,714	2.51	+2.51
Natural Law	Roy Forrester	968	1.42	+1.42
Citizens Electoral Council	Nigel Gleeson	439	0.64	+0.64
Total formal votes		68,202	97.83	−0.23
Informal votes		1,512	2.17	0.23
Turnout		69,714	95.82	
Two-party-preferred result
National	Garry Nehl	36,846	54.06	−1.50
Labor	Paul Sekfy	31,311	45.94	+1.50
National hold		Swing	−1.50	

==== 1990 ====
1990 Australian federal election: Cowper
Party	Candidate	Votes	%	±%
National	Garry Nehl	35,379	47.5	−2.8
Labor	John Murphy	23,219	31.2	−4.1
Democrats	Trevor Pike	7,353	9.9	+3.7
Independent	David Rees	6,640	8.9	+2.4
Cowper Greens	Angelique Meers	1,906	2.6	+2.6
Total formal votes		74,497	98.1	
Informal votes		1,476	1.9	
Turnout		75,973	95.4	
Two-party-preferred result
National	Garry Nehl	42,647	57.3	−1.8
Labor	John Murphy	31,722	42.7	+1.8
National hold		Swing	−1.8	

=== Elections in the 1980s ===
==== 1987 ====
1987 Australian federal election: Cowper
Party	Candidate	Votes	%	±%
National	Garry Nehl	33,328	50.3	+20.2
Labor	John Murphy	23,393	35.3	−5.8
Independent	David Rees	4,273	6.5	+3.1
Democrats	Dorothy Thompson	4,122	6.2	+3.3
Independent	Max Austin	1,132	1.7	+1.7
Total formal votes		66,248	97.2	
Informal votes		1,929	2.8	
Turnout		68,177	93.5	
Two-party-preferred result
National	Garry Nehl	39,150	59.1	+5.0
Labor	John Murphy	27,089	40.9	−5.0
National hold		Swing	+5.0	

==== 1984 ====
1984 Australian federal election: Cowper
Party	Candidate	Votes	%	±%
Labor	Joe Moran	24,672	41.1	+0.3
National	Garry Nehl	18,110	30.1	−20.4
Liberal	Peter Simpson	12,032	20.0	+20.0
Independent	David Rees	2,027	3.4	+3.4
Democrats	Alfred Tozer	1,729	2.9	−5.9
Independent	Keith Jervis	1,499	2.5	+2.5
Total formal votes		60,069	96.0	
Informal votes		2,523	4.0	
Turnout		62,592	95.4	
Two-party-preferred result
National	Garry Nehl	32,491	54.1	−0.1
Labor	Joe Moran	27,565	45.9	+0.1
National hold		Swing	−0.1	

==== 1983 ====
1983 Australian federal election: Cowper
Party	Candidate	Votes	%	±%
National	Ian Robinson	38,351	48.4	−6.1
Labor	Joseph Moran	33,986	42.9	+2.5
Democrats	Peter Brown	6,962	8.8	+3.8
Total formal votes		79,299	98.8	
Informal votes		982	1.2	
Turnout		80,281	95.2	
Two-party-preferred result
National	Ian Robinson	41,305	52.1	−4.4
Labor	Joseph Moran	37,994	47.9	+4.4
National hold		Swing	−4.4	

==== 1980 ====
1980 Australian federal election: Cowper
Party	Candidate	Votes	%	±%
National Country	Ian Robinson	39,374	54.5	−9.4
Labor	Valma Melville	29,192	40.4	+4.3
Democrats	John Pierce	3,631	5.0	+5.0
Total formal votes		72,197	98.6	
Informal votes		995	1.4	
Turnout		73,192	94.9	
Two-party-preferred result
National Country	Ian Robinson		56.5	−7.4
Labor	Valma Melville		43.5	+7.4
National Country hold		Swing	−7.4	

=== Elections in the 1970s ===
==== 1977 ====
1977 Australian federal election: Cowper
Party	Candidate	Votes	%	±%
National Country	Ian Robinson	41,015	63.9	+2.5
Labor	Colin Clague	23,221	36.1	+1.5
Total formal votes		64,236	98.1	
Informal votes		1,231	1.9	
Turnout		65,467	95.9	
National Country hold		Swing	+0.5	

==== 1975 ====
1975 Australian federal election: Cowper
Party	Candidate	Votes	%	±%
National Country	Ian Robinson	34,948	62.3	+6.5
Labor	Colin Clague	18,893	33.7	−8.7
Independent	John McLachlan	1,662	3.0	+3.0
Independent	John Holcombe	574	1.0	+1.0
Total formal votes		56,077	98.4	
Informal votes		654	1.6	
Turnout		56,731	95.4	
Two-party-preferred result
National Country	Ian Robinson		64.3	+7.7
Labor	Colin Clague		33.7	−7.7
National Country hold		Swing	+7.7	

==== 1974 ====
1974 Australian federal election: Cowper
Party	Candidate	Votes	%	±%
Country	Ian Robinson	29,889	55.8	+6.4
Labor	Thomas Cronin	22,730	42.4	−2.4
Australia	James Davies	585	1.1	−1.9
Independent	Raymond Hardy	391	0.7	+0.7
Total formal votes		53,595	98.9	
Informal votes		620	1.1	
Turnout		54,215	96.2	
Two-party-preferred result
Country	Ian Robinson		56.6	+4.1
Labor	Thomas Cronin		43.4	−4.1
Country hold		Swing	−4.1	

==== 1972 ====
1972 Australian federal election: Cowper
Party	Candidate	Votes	%	±%
Country	Ian Robinson	23,437	49.4	−13.5
Labor	Thomas Cronin	21,235	44.8	+44.8
Australia	John Maynes	1,410	3.0	+3.0
Democratic Labor	David Cumming	1,349	2.8	+2.8
Total formal votes		47,431	98.7	
Informal votes		633	1.3	
Turnout		48,064	96.2	
Two-party-preferred result
Country	Ian Robinson		52.5	−13.0
Labor	Thomas Cronin		47.5	+47.5
Country hold		Swing	−13.0	

=== Elections in the 1960s ===
==== 1969 ====
1969 Australian federal election: Cowper
Party	Candidate	Votes	%	±%
Country	Ian Robinson	27,681	62.9	−1.6
Independent	Neil Royal	10,351	23.5	+23.5
Independent	Brian Richards	5,965	13.6	+13.6
Total formal votes		43,977	98.5	
Informal votes		649	1.5	
Turnout		44,646	95.5	
Two-party-preferred result
Country	Ian Robinson		65.5	−1.6
Independent	Neil Royal		34.5	+34.5
Country hold		Swing	−1.6	

==== 1966 ====
1966 Australian federal election: Cowper
Party	Candidate	Votes	%	±%
Country	Ian Robinson	24,602	63.5	+10.5
Labor	Burwood Gillett	13,044	33.7	−13.3
Liberal Reform Group	William Tredinnick	1,076	2.8	+2.8
Total formal votes		38,722	98.3	
Informal votes		680	1.7	
Turnout		39,402	96.7	
Two-party-preferred result
Country	Ian Robinson		64.2	+11.2
Labor	Burwood Gillett		35.8	−11.2
Country hold		Swing	+11.2	

==== 1963 ====
1963 Australian federal election: Cowper
Party	Candidate	Votes	%	±%
Country	Ian Robinson	20,556	53.0	+13.1
Labor	Frank McGuren	18,237	47.0	+1.1
Total formal votes		38,793	99.4	
Informal votes		240	0.6	
Turnout		39,033	96.9	
Country gain from Labor		Swing	+4.8	

==== 1961 ====
1961 Australian federal election: Cowper
Party	Candidate	Votes	%	±%
Labor	Frank McGuren	17,567	45.9	+9.7
Country	Sir Earle Page	15,259	39.9	−14.9
Independent	Neville Weiley	5,435	14.2	+14.2
Total formal votes		38,261	98.1	
Informal votes		725	1.9	
Turnout		38,986	96.4	
Two-party-preferred result
Labor	Frank McGuren	19,803	51.8	+12.9
Country	Sir Earle Page	18,458	48.2	−12.9
Labor gain from Country		Swing	+12.9	

=== Elections in the 1950s ===
==== 1958 ====
1958 Australian federal election: Cowper
Party	Candidate	Votes	%	±%
Country	Sir Earle Page	21,152	54.8	−45.2
Labor	Frank McGuren	13,980	36.2	+36.2
Democratic Labor	John Kellett	3,437	8.9	+8.9
Total formal votes		38,569	98.0	
Informal votes		795	2.0	
Turnout		39,364	96.1	
Two-party-preferred result
Country	Sir Earle Page		61.1	−38.9
Labor	Frank McGuren		38.9	+38.9
Country hold		Swing	−38.9	

==== 1955 ====
1955 Australian federal election: Cowper
Party	Candidate	Votes	%	±%
Country	Sir Earle Page	unopposed		
Country hold		Swing		

==== 1954 ====
1954 Australian federal election: Cowper
Party	Candidate	Votes	%	±%
Country	Sir Earle Page	21,767	58.8	−2.2
Labor	William Bailey	14,751	39.8	+2.8
Communist	Kenneth Harding	503	1.4	+1.4
Total formal votes		37,021	99.1	
Informal votes		330	0.9	
Turnout		37,351	95.7	
Two-party-preferred result
Country	Sir Earle Page		58.9	−3.1
Labor	William Bailey		41.1	+3.1
Country hold		Swing	−3.1	

==== 1951 ====
1951 Australian federal election: Cowper
Party	Candidate	Votes	%	±%
Country	Sir Earle Page	22,632	61.0	−0.7
Labor	William Bailey	13,743	37.0	−1.3
Independent	William Tomlinson	724	2.0	+2.0
Total formal votes		37,099	98.9	
Informal votes		425	1.1	
Turnout		37,524	96.7	
Two-party-preferred result
Country	Sir Earle Page		62.0	+0.3
Labor	William Bailey		38.0	−0.3
Country hold		Swing	+0.3	

=== Elections in the 1940s ===
==== 1949 ====
1949 Australian federal election: Cowper
Party	Candidate	Votes	%	±%
Country	Sir Earle Page	22,791	61.7	+0.9
Labor	Louis Jabour	14,134	38.3	+3.0
Total formal votes		36,925	98.9	
Informal votes		404	1.1	
Turnout		47,329	96.9	
Country hold		Swing	−1.0	

==== 1946 ====
1946 Australian federal election: Cowper
Party	Candidate	Votes	%	±%
Country	Sir Earle Page	31,785	57.2	+11.7
Labor	George Mitchell	21,253	38.2	−2.3
Independent	Richard Williams	2,544	4.6	+4.6
Total formal votes		55,582	99.6	
Informal votes		798	1.4	
Turnout		56,380	95.2	
Two-party-preferred result
Country	Sir Earle Page		59.5	+6.9
Labor	George Mitchell		40.5	−6.9
Country hold		Swing	+6.9	

==== 1943 ====
1943 Australian federal election: Cowper
Party	Candidate	Votes	%	±%
Country	Sir Earle Page	24,017	45.5	−8.2
Labor	John Howard	21,375	40.5	+18.6
Independent	Joseph McElhone	5,403	10.2	−6.0
One Parliament	Alexander Moore	1,936	3.7	+3.7
Total formal votes		52,731	98.7	
Informal votes		690	1.3	
Turnout		53,421	97.0	
Two-party-preferred result
Country	Sir Earle Page	27,736	52.6	−12.3
Labor	John Howard	24,995	47.4	+12.3
Country hold		Swing	−12.3	

==== 1940 ====
1940 Australian federal election: Cowper
Party	Candidate	Votes	%	±%
Country	Sir Earle Page	27,773	53.7	−9.5
Labor	Myles Kelly	11,350	21.9	−14.9
Independent	Joseph McElhone	8,391	16.2	+16.2
Independent	John Cain	4,243	8.2	+8.2
Total formal votes		51,757	98.3	
Informal votes		909	1.7	
Turnout		52,666	95.0	
Two-party-preferred result
Country	Sir Earle Page		64.9	+1.7
Labor	Myles Kelly		33.1	−1.7
Country hold		Swing	−13.0	

=== Elections in the 1930s ===
==== 1937 ====
1937 Australian federal election: Cowper
Party	Candidate	Votes	%	±%
Country	Earle Page	32,000	63.2	−1.0
Labor	Abraham Brindley	18,646	36.8	+36.8
Total formal votes		50,646	98.3	
Informal votes		888	1.7	
Turnout		51,534	95.9	
Country hold		Swing	−7.2	

==== 1934 ====
1934 Australian federal election: Cowper
Party	Candidate	Votes	%	±%
Country	Earle Page	30,924	64.2	−3.2
Labor (NSW)	William McCristal	10,321	21.4	+9.6
Social Credit	Hereward Kesteven	6,958	14.4	+14.4
Total formal votes		48,203	97.7	
Informal votes		1,130	2.3	
Turnout		49,333	95.5	
Two-party-preferred result
Country	Earle Page		70.4	−4.9
Labor (NSW)	William McCristal		29.6	+29.6
Country hold		Swing	−4.9	

==== 1931 ====
1931 Australian federal election: Cowper
Party	Candidate	Votes	%	±%
Country	Earle Page	29,266	72.3	−27.7
Labor	John Cusack	6,417	15.9	+15.9
Labor (NSW)	Tom Roach	4,790	11.8	+11.8
Total formal votes		40,473	98.8	
Informal votes		913	2.2	
Turnout		41,386	95.7	
Two-party-preferred result
Country	Earle Page		75.3	−24.7
Labor	John Cusack		24.7	+24.7
Country hold		Swing	−24.7	

=== Elections in the 1920s ===
==== 1929 ====
1929 Australian federal election: Cowper
Party	Candidate	Votes	%	±%
Country	Earle Page	unopposed		
Country hold		Swing		

==== 1928 ====
1928 Australian federal election: Cowper
Party	Candidate	Votes	%	±%
Country	Earle Page	27,556	76.8	+6.8
Labor	Tom Swiney	8,336	23.2	−6.8
Total formal votes		35,892	95.6	
Informal votes		1,659	4.4	
Turnout		37,551	95.7	
Country hold		Swing	+6.8	

==== 1925 ====
1925 Australian federal election: Cowper
Party	Candidate	Votes	%	±%
Country	Earle Page	24,571	70.0	+2.7
Labor	Lockhart Easton	10,510	30.0	+30.0
Total formal votes		35,081	98.5	
Informal votes		544	1.5	
Turnout		35,625	92.8	
Country hold		Swing	+2.7	

==== 1922 ====
1922 Australian federal election: Cowper
Party	Candidate	Votes	%	±%
Country	Earle Page	13,157	67.3	+14.9
Nationalist	John Thomson	6,398	32.7	+11.4
Total formal votes		19,555	94.9	
Informal votes		1,060	5.1	
Turnout		20,615	52.9	
Country hold		Swing	−4.3	

=== Elections in the 1910s ===
==== 1919 ====
1919 Australian federal election: Cowper
Party	Candidate	Votes	%	±%
Farmers and Settlers	Earle Page	11,372	52.4	+52.4
Labor	Ross Pryor	5,712	26.3	+26.3
Nationalist	John Thomson	4,524	21.3	−78.7
Total formal votes		21,708	94.8	
Informal votes		1,197	5.2	
Turnout		22,905	65.0	
Two-party-preferred result
Farmers and Settlers	Earle Page		71.6	+71.6
Labor	Ross Pryor		28.4	+28.4
Farmers and Settlers gain from Nationalist		Swing	+71.6	

==== 1917 ====
1917 Australian federal election: Cowper
Party	Candidate	Votes	%	±%
Nationalist	John Thomson	unopposed		
Nationalist hold		Swing		

==== 1914 ====
1914 Australian federal election: Cowper
Party	Candidate	Votes	%	±%
Liberal	John Thomson	unopposed		
Liberal hold		Swing		

==== 1913 ====
1913 Australian federal election: Cowper
Party	Candidate	Votes	%	±%
Liberal	John Thomson	17,152	72.2	+4.1
Labor	Con Hogan	6,620	27.8	−0.9
Total formal votes		23,772	97.6	
Informal votes		576	2.4	
Turnout		24,348	66.1	
Liberal hold		Swing	+2.5	

==== 1910 ====
1910 Australian federal election: Cowper
Party	Candidate	Votes	%	±%
Liberal	John Thomson	8,686	67.9	−16.6
Labour	Clem Johnson	3,692	28.9	+25.3
Independent Labour	John O'Brien	418	3.3	+3.3
Total formal votes		12,796	97.6	
Informal votes		313	2.4	
Turnout		13,109	40.6	
Liberal hold		Swing	−30.5	

=== Elections in the 1900s ===
==== 1906 ====
1906 Australian federal election: Cowper
Party	Candidate	Votes	%	±%
Protectionist	John Thomson	4,794	43.1	+6.1
Anti-Socialist	Henry Lee	4,602	41.4	−21.6
Independent	Eugene Rudder	1,316	11.8	+11.8
Labour	John O'Brien	399	3.6	+3.6
Total formal votes		11,111	96.5	
Informal votes		404	3.5	
Turnout		11,515	41.7	
Protectionist gain from Anti-Socialist		Swing	+13.9	

==== 1903 ====
1903 Australian federal election: Cowper
Party	Candidate	Votes	%	±%
Free Trade	Henry Lee	7,456	63.0	+29.4
Protectionist	Francis Clarke	4,384	37.0	−1.3
Total formal votes		11,840	97.4	
Informal votes		328	2.6	
Turnout		12,168	47.6	
Free Trade gain from Protectionist		Swing	+15.4	

==== 1901 ====
1901 Australian federal election: Cowper
Party	Candidate	Votes	%	±%
Protectionist	Francis Clarke	3,267	38.3	+38.3
Free Trade	Robert Davidson	2,866	33.6	+33.6
Ind. Protectionist	Hugh McKinnon	2,387	28.0	+28.0
Total formal votes		8,520	98.7	
Informal votes		112	1.3	
Turnout		8,632	67.4	
Protectionist win		(new seat)		
