= Electoral results for the district of Casino =

Election results for Casino, New South Wales, Australia

Casino, an electoral district of the Legislative Assembly in the Australian state of New South Wales had two incarnations, from 1930 until 1968 and from 1971 until 1981.

== Members ==
First incarnation (1930–1968)
| Election | Member | Party |
|---|---|---|
| 1930 | John Reid | Country |
| 1932 | John Reid | Country |
| 1935 | John Reid | Country |
| 1938 | John Reid | Country |
| 1941 | John Reid | Country |
| 1944 | John Reid | Country |
| 1947 | John Reid | Country |
| 1950 | John Reid | Country |
| 1953 | Ian Robinson | Country |
| 1956 | Ian Robinson | Country |
| 1959 | Ian Robinson | Country |
| 1962 | Ian Robinson | Country |
| 1964 by | Richmond Manyweathers | Country |
| 1965 | Richmond Manyweathers | Country |
Second incarnation (1971–1981)
| Election | Member | Party |
| 1971 | Don Day | Labor |
| 1973 | Don Day | Labor |
| 1976 | Don Day | Labor |
| 1978 | Don Day | Labor |

== Election results ==
=== Elections in the 1970s ===
==== 1978 ====
1978 New South Wales state election: Casino
| Party | Candidate | Votes | % | ±% |
|---|---|---|---|---|
| Labor | Don Day | 12,937 | 57.8 | +7.9 |
| National Country | Colin Sullivan | 6,173 | 27.6 | +27.6 |
| National Country | William Marshall | 2,895 | 12.9 | +12.9 |
| Independent | Peter Den Exter | 367 | 1.6 | +1.6 |
| Total formal votes | | 22,372 | 98.8 | −0.3 |
| Informal votes | | 273 | 1.2 | +0.3 |
| Turnout | | 22,645 | 94.5 | −0.1 |
Two-party-preferred result
| Labor | Don Day | 13,345 | 59.7 | +8.1 |
| National Country | Colin Sullivan | 9,025 | 40.3 | −8.1 |
| Labor hold | | Swing | +8.1 | |

==== 1976 ====
1976 New South Wales state election: Casino
| Party | Candidate | Votes | % | ±% |
|---|---|---|---|---|
| Labor | Don Day | 10,829 | 49.9 | +2.8 |
| Country | Donald McRae | 5,677 | 26.2 | +3.8 |
| Country | Leslie Isaac | 5,186 | 23.9 | +23.9 |
| Total formal votes | | 21,692 | 99.1 | 0.0 |
| Informal votes | | 193 | 0.9 | 0.0 |
| Turnout | | 21,885 | 94.6 | +0.7 |
Two-party-preferred result
| Labor | Don Day | 11,197 | 51.6 | +0.6 |
| Country | Donald McRae | 10,495 | 48.4 | −0.6 |
| Labor hold | | Swing | +0.6 | |

==== 1973 ====
1973 New South Wales state election: Casino
| Party | Candidate | Votes | % | ±% |
|---|---|---|---|---|
| Labor | Don Day | 9,530 | 47.1 | −3.9 |
| Country | Donald McRae | 4,529 | 22.4 | −26.6 |
| Country | Owen Wainwright | 4,092 | 20.2 | +20.2 |
| Independent | Clifford Hirst | 2,084 | 10.3 | +10.3 |
| Total formal votes | | 20,235 | 99.1 | |
| Informal votes | | 181 | 0.9 | |
| Turnout | | 20,416 | 93.9 | |
Two-party-preferred result
| Labor | Don Day | 10,318 | 51.0 | 0.0 |
| Country | Donald McRae | 9,917 | 49.0 | 0.0 |
| Labor hold | | Swing | 0.0 | |

==== 1971 ====
1971 New South Wales state election: Casino
| Party | Candidate | Votes | % | ±% |
|---|---|---|---|---|
| Labor | Don Day | 9,135 | 52.5 | +17.1 |
| Country | Charles Yabsley | 8,281 | 47.5 | −17.1 |
| Total formal votes | | 17,416 | 99.0 | |
| Informal votes | | 179 | 1.0 | |
| Turnout | | 17,595 | 93.8 | |
| Labor notional gain from Country | | Swing | +17.1 | |

=== Elections in the 1960s ===
==== 1965 ====
1965 New South Wales state election: Casino
| Party | Candidate | Votes | % | ±% |
|---|---|---|---|---|
| Country | Richmond Manyweathers | unopposed | | |
| Country hold | | | | |

==== 1964 by-election ====
1964 Casino by-election Saturday 29 February
| Party | Candidate | Votes | % | ±% |
|---|---|---|---|---|
| Country | Richmond Manyweathers | 5,433 | 36.3 | |
| Country | Robert Nicholls | 3,092 | 20.7 | |
| Country | Charles Yabsley | 3,053 | 20.4 | |
| Independent | William Young | 1,868 | 12.5 | |
| Country | Roderick Ramsay | 1,526 | 10.2 | |
| Total formal votes | | 14,972 | 98.4 | |
| Informal votes | | 243 | 1.6 | |
| Turnout | | 15,215 | 89.9 | |
Two-candidate-preferred result
| Country | Richmond Manyweathers | 5,433 | 36.3 | |
| Country | Charles Yabsley | 3,053 | 20.4 | |
| Country hold | | Swing | N/A | |

==== 1962 ====
1962 New South Wales state election: Casino
| Party | Candidate | Votes | % | ±% |
|---|---|---|---|---|
| Country | Ian Robinson | 10,773 | 66.6 | −33.4 |
| Labor | Douglas Cassidy | 5,390 | 33.4 | +33.4 |
| Total formal votes | | 16,163 | 99.4 | |
| Informal votes | | 101 | 0.6 | |
| Turnout | | 16,264 | 94.9 | |
| Country hold | | Swing | N/A | |

=== Elections in the 1950s ===
==== 1959 ====
1959 New South Wales state election: Casino
| Party | Candidate | Votes | % | ±% |
|---|---|---|---|---|
| Country | Ian Robinson | unopposed | | |
| Country hold | | | | |

==== 1956 ====
1956 New South Wales state election: Casino
| Party | Candidate | Votes | % | ±% |
|---|---|---|---|---|
| Country | Ian Robinson | unopposed | | |
| Country hold | | | | |

==== 1953 ====
1953 New South Wales state election: Casino
| Party | Candidate | Votes | % | ±% |
|---|---|---|---|---|
| Labor | William Young | 5,199 | 36.7 | |
| Country | Ian Robinson | 4,547 | 32.1 | |
| Country | John Reid | 3,152 | 22.2 | |
| Country | William Cooke | 1,275 | 9.0 | |
| Total formal votes | | 14,173 | 98.3 | |
| Informal votes | | 249 | 1.7 | |
| Turnout | | 14,422 | 94.0 | |
Two-party-preferred result
| Country | Ian Robinson | 8,560 | 60.4 | |
| Labor | William Young | 5,613 | 39.6 | |
| Country hold | | Swing | | |

==== 1950 ====
1950 New South Wales state election: Casino
| Party | Candidate | Votes | % | ±% |
|---|---|---|---|---|
| Country | John Reid | 9,546 | 66.4 | |
| Labor | Alexander Bryen | 4,840 | 33.6 | |
| Total formal votes | | 14,386 | 98.8 | |
| Informal votes | | 180 | 1.2 | |
| Turnout | | 14,566 | 93.1 | |
| Country hold | | Swing | | |

=== Elections in the 1940s ===
==== 1947 ====
1947 New South Wales state election: Casino
| Party | Candidate | Votes | % | ±% |
|---|---|---|---|---|
| Country | John Reid | 9,132 | 63.8 | +6.7 |
| Labor | Harold Edwards | 5,172 | 36.2 | −6.7 |
| Total formal votes | | 14,304 | 98.5 | +1.2 |
| Informal votes | | 214 | 1.5 | −1.2 |
| Turnout | | 14,518 | 92.7 | +4.1 |
| Country hold | | Swing | +6.7 | |

==== 1944 ====
1944 New South Wales state election: Casino
| Party | Candidate | Votes | % | ±% |
|---|---|---|---|---|
| Country | John Reid | 7,502 | 57.1 | +9.5 |
| Labor | Denis Holmes | 5,645 | 42.9 | +9.8 |
| Total formal votes | | 13,147 | 97.3 | −1.0 |
| Informal votes | | 366 | 2.7 | +1.0 |
| Turnout | | 13,513 | 88.6 | −4.2 |
| Country hold | | Swing | −3.8 | |

==== 1941 ====
1941 New South Wales state election: Casino
| Party | Candidate | Votes | % | ±% |
|---|---|---|---|---|
| Country | John Reid | 6,468 | 47.6 | |
| Labor | Denis Holmes | 4,494 | 33.1 | |
| Independent | Robert Carr | 2,630 | 19.4 | |
| Total formal votes | | 13,592 | 98.3 | |
| Informal votes | | 230 | 1.7 | |
| Turnout | | 13,822 | 92.8 | |
Two-party-preferred result
| Country | John Reid | 8,285 | 60.9 | |
| Labor | Denis Holmes | 5,307 | 39.1 | |
| Country hold | | Swing | | |

=== Elections in the 1930s ===
==== 1938 ====
1938 New South Wales state election: Casino
| Party | Candidate | Votes | % | ±% |
|---|---|---|---|---|
| Country | John Reid | unopposed | | |
| Country hold | | | | |

==== 1935 ====
1935 New South Wales state election: Casino
| Party | Candidate | Votes | % | ±% |
|---|---|---|---|---|
| Country | John Reid | 9,302 | 71.1 | −3.0 |
| Labor (NSW) | Leonard Sweeney | 3,771 | 28.9 | +4.2 |
| Total formal votes | | 13,073 | 98.7 | +1.4 |
| Informal votes | | 171 | 1.3 | −1.4 |
| Turnout | | 13,244 | 93.8 | −3.4 |
| Country hold | | Swing | N/A | |

==== 1932 ====
1932 New South Wales state election: Casino
| Party | Candidate | Votes | % | ±% |
|---|---|---|---|---|
| Country | John Reid | 9,078 | 74.1 | +49.6 |
| Labor (NSW) | James Fredericks | 3,020 | 24.7 | −4.5 |
| Country | Henry McLaurin | 148 | 1.2 | +1.2 |
| Total formal votes | | 12,246 | 97.3 | +3.6 |
| Informal votes | | 343 | 2.7 | −3.6 |
| Turnout | | 12,589 | 97.2 | +1.5 |
| Country hold | | Swing | N/A | |

- Preferences were not distributed.

==== 1930 ====
1930 New South Wales state election: Casino
| Party | Candidate | Votes | % | ±% |
|---|---|---|---|---|
| Labor | Herbert Young | 3,335 | 29.2 | |
| Country | John Reid | 2,801 | 24.5 | |
| Country | Elsmer Jones | 1,464 | 12.8 | |
| Country | Percy Swanson | 1,363 | 11.9 | |
| Country | Ernest Vincent | 1,006 | 8.8 | |
| Country | Malcolm Bulmer | 790 | 6.9 | |
| Independent | Samuel Sargent | 350 | 3.1 | |
| Independent Labor | Frederick Crowther | 258 | 2.3 | |
| Independent Labor | John Kelly | 66 | 0.6 | |
| Total formal votes | | 11,433 | 93.7 | |
| Informal votes | | 765 | 6.3 | |
| Turnout | | 12,198 | 95.7 | |
Two-party-preferred result
| Country | John Reid | 7,337 | 64.2 | |
| Labor | Herbert Young | 4,096 | 35.8 | |
| Country win | | (new seat) | | |

The 1929 redistribution increased the number of seats in the rural zone, and Casino was created from parts of Tenterfield and Clarence both of which were held by the Country Party.
