= 1964 Casino state by-election =

- 29 February 1964

Electoral district of Casino in the New South Wales Legislative Assembly
- Registered: 16,917
- Turnout: 89.94%
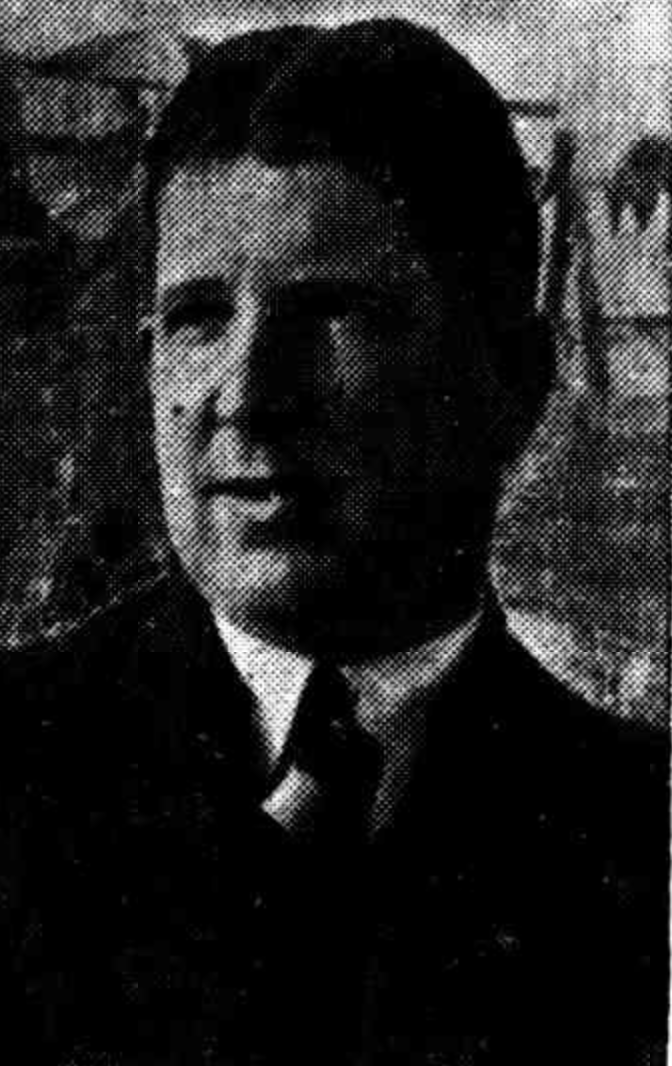

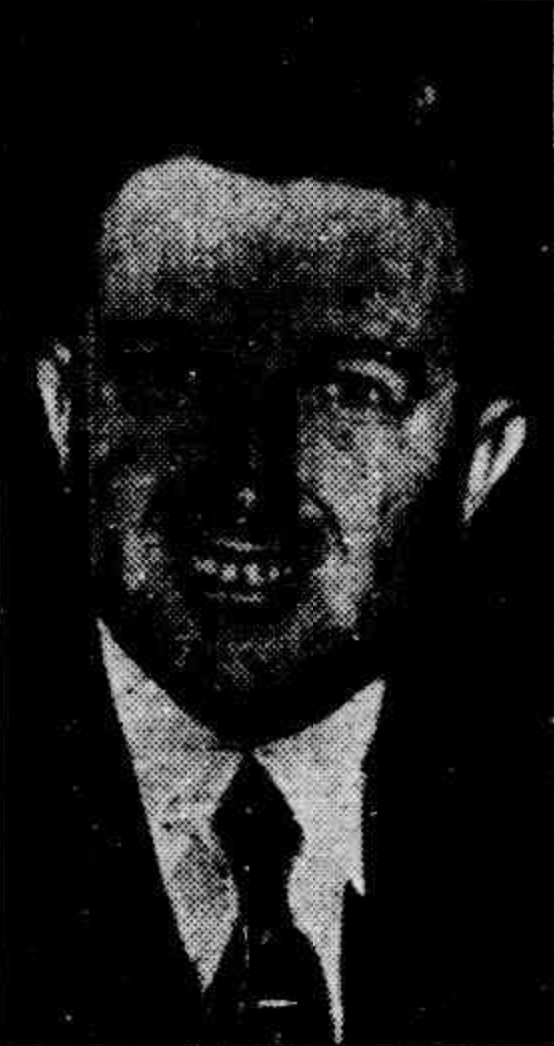
	First party	Second party	Third party
		COU	COU
Candidate	Richmond Manyweathers	Robert Nicholls	Charles Yabsley
Party	Country	Country	Country
Primary vote	5,433	3,092	3,053
Percentage	36.29%	20.65%	20.39%
TCP	58.48%	41.52%
	Fourth party	Fifth party
		COU
Candidate	William Young	Roderick Ramsay
Party	Independent	Country
Primary vote	1,868	1,526
Percentage	12.48%	10.19%
MP before election
Ian Robinson
Country
Elected MP
Richmond Manyweathers
Country

The 1964 Casino state by-election was held on 29 February 1964 to elect the member for Casino in the New South Wales Legislative Assembly, following the resignation of Country Party MP Ian Robinson.

Robinson resigned from the Legislative Assembly after winning the seat of Cowper at the 1963 federal election. In a field of four Country candidates and one independent, Richmond Manyweathers retained the seat for the Country Party with 58.48% of the two-candidate-preferred vote.

== Key dates ==
- 22 October 1963 – Ian Robinson resigned
- 5 February 1964 – Writ of election issued by the Speaker of the Legislative Assembly
- 12 February 1964 – Candidate nominations
- 29 February 1964 – Polling day
- 31 March 1964 – Return of writ

== Candidates ==
Party	Candidate	Background
Country	Richmond Manyweathers	Mayor of Casino
Country	Robert Nicholls	
Country	Roderick Ramsay	
Country	Charles Yabsley	
Independent	William Young	Labor candidate for Casino in 1953

== Result ==
1964 Casino state by-election
Party	Candidate	Votes	%	±%
Country	Richmond Manyweathers	5,433	36.29	
Country	Robert Nicholls	3,092	20.65	
Country	Charles Yabsley	3,053	20.39	
Independent	William Young	1,868	12.48	
Country	Roderick Ramsay	1,526	10.19	
Total formal votes		14,972	98.40	
Informal votes		243	1.60	
Turnout		15,215	89.94	
Two-candidate-preferred result
Country	Richmond Manyweathers	5,433	58.48	
Country	Charles Yabsley	3,053	41.52	
Country hold				

== See also ==
- Electoral results for the district of Casino
- List of New South Wales state by-elections
