= New England New State Movement =

Statehood movement in Australia

Flag used by the New England New State Movement

The New England New State Movement was an Australian political movement in the twentieth century. Founded as the Northern Separation Movement, the aim of the movement was to seek the secession of the New England region and surrounding areas from the State of New South Wales (NSW) and the establishment of a new State of New England. While popular at first and the subject of two Royal Commissions, the movement was unsuccessful, and was defeated at a referendum in 1967.

== Geographical description ==
Because New England has never had a formal identity, its claimed boundaries have varied with time. In broad terms, it covers the humid coastal strip including the Hunter Region to the Queensland border, the New England Tablelands and the immediately adjoining Western Slopes and Plains.

In economic and geographic terms, New England forms a natural unit that has survived to the present day.

In political terms, the boundaries have varied. The initial separation discussions excluded the Hunter, in part because of tensions between the industrial and mining heartland of the lower Hunter and the rest of the area. This created a problem because an urban/industrial centre like Newcastle and the Hunter were seen as an essential part of New England, or any new state, in economic and geographic terms. The boundaries recommended by the 1935 report of the Nicholas Royal Commission into areas of NSW suitable for self-government included Newcastle and the Hunter. These boundaries were adopted by the New England New State Movement and used as the basis for the 1967 self-government referendum.

== Name ==
New England was first called Northern NSW, the North, the Northern Districts or the Northern Provinces. The name New England was applied to the Tableland area forming New England's core. The Tablelands are known as the Northern Tablelands, the New England Tablelands or sometimes just the New England to distinguish them from the broader New England area.

The name New England was adopted for the whole area by the Northern Separation Movement at its 1931 Maitland convention. From there its usage spread, contracting again as the new state movement went into decline after 1967.

== Philosophical origins ==
From its earliest days, separatism was associated with the then newly formed Country Party, and its immediate predecessor the Progressive Party. The rationale for a separate state had parallels with that of the Country Party itself, a belief that country interests needed to be defended against dominant metropolitan interests, particularly, but not only, those associated with the Australian Labor Party. Within the area proposed for the new state—especially if the industrial and mining area of the Lower Hunter were to be excluded—the Country Party stood a far better chance of forming a majority government, something politically impossible within the existing larger state of New South Wales. The Country Party's influence at federal level would also tend to increase, by the creation of new senators representing the new state.

The demographics of the area of the proposed new state area were also significant. Compared to the metropolitan and southern parts of New South Wales, the Northern Tablelands and Northern Rivers had a higher concentration of followers of the then-dominant Protestant religions, had more people of Scottish descent—Scottish influence is apparent in Upper Hunter and Northern Tablelands place names, such as Aberdeen, Scone, Armidale (from Armadale), Glencoe, Dundee, Glen Innes, and Ben Lomond—and was somewhat less Catholic. The choice of a lion rampant, highly-reminiscent of the Royal Banner of Scotland, as the movement's flag suggests that, at least in the movement's earlier years, an element of sectarianism, as well as separatism, may have been involved. However, especially after the Second World War, the movement did have supporters among Catholics, in particular, the National Catholic Rural Movement, founded in 1939, which had a political philosophy based upon the doctrine known as Catholic social teaching. With its stated aim to ‘to restore and develop agriculture as the central institution of national life’, the National Catholic Rural Movement was seen as 'running on parallel lines' to and as a natural ally of the New State movement. By 1949, the Catholic bishop of Armidale, Edward Doody, a supporter of anti-communist Catholic political activist, B.A Santamaria, was a member of the New State movement's executive council.

== New state agitation ==
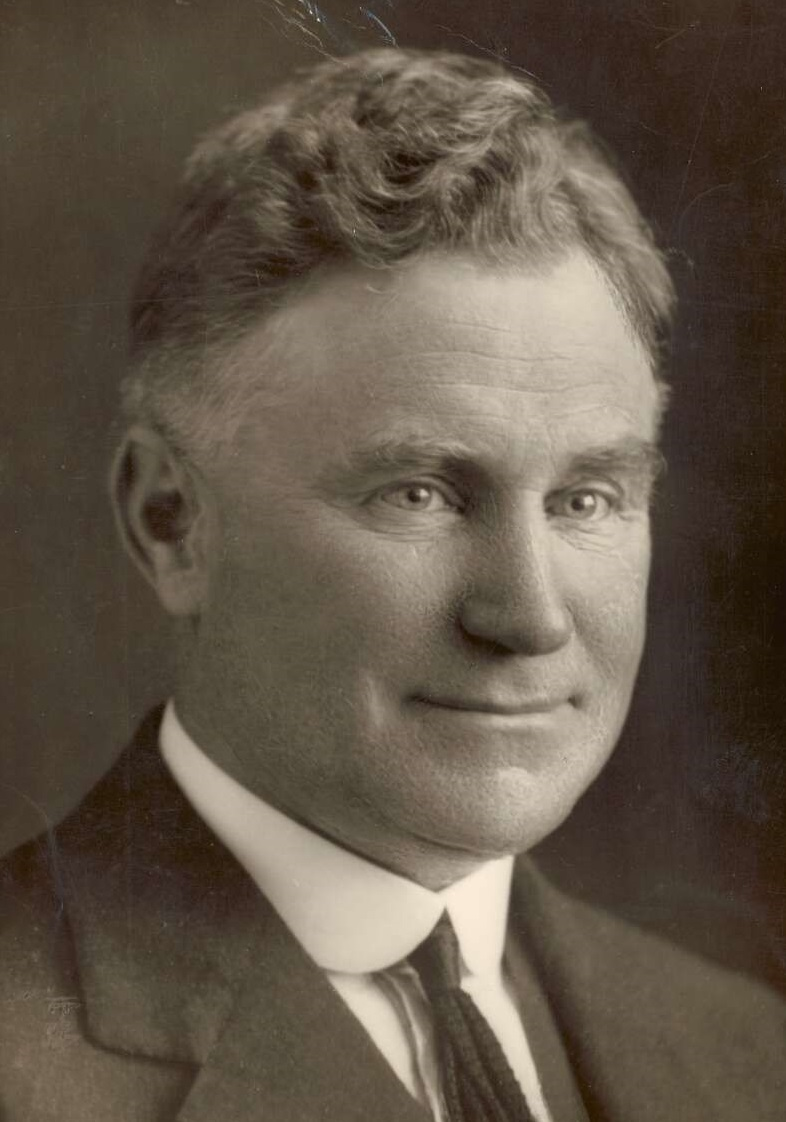
Earle Page, founder of the New State movement and later Prime Minister of Australia

The first separatist agitation occurred during colonial times at the time of the separation of Queensland from NSW. While this was followed by outbreaks of agitation, these remained sporadic. Well-organised 'Separation Leagues' existed at both Glen Innes and Grafton in the late 1880s, but did not make progress.

This changed in the twentieth century. Agitation began again at Grafton towards the end of the First World War led by Earle Page, a local doctor and later a prominent politician, rising to caretaker Prime Minister of Australia. This was picked up a little later by Victor Thompson, editor of the Tamworth Northern Daily Leader who launched a sustained newspaper campaign that involved papers as far south as Cessnock in the lower Hunter. This led to the creation of a formal movement. In 1922 a formal request to the Commonwealth was made by the lower house to establish a new state in northern New South Wales. One outcome was the 1924 Cohen Royal Commission into New States.

The Cohen Commission ruled against the movement and it went into decline, resurging at the start of the Great Depression. This forced another Royal Commission, the Nicholas Commission. While this recommended in favour, the movement was again in decline as economic conditions improved.

Agitation started again at the end of the Second World War and this time was sustained by permanent staff. In 1953, 21 councils defied the state government and held unofficial referendum on the issue of a new state. The people voted overwhelmingly in favour of the referendum. In 1961 the movement launched Operation Seventh State, raising over AU£100,000. This allowed more staff and greater agitation.

This acceptance of boundaries determined by the Nicholas Commission proved to be the movement's critical strategic error. It assumed that a state was not viable unless it was dominated by a large urban population on the English/London model. Yet, the evidence from similar federations like Canada and the USA revealed numerous successful "farm states", like Wyoming, Montana and the Dakotas, with comparatively small capital city populations tied to a single, essentially rural community of interest. This metrocentric mindset ensured that two quite distinct communities of interest were being pressured into a doomed arranged marriage. It was also the very antithesis of an "act of free choice" as that choice involved imposing a majority rural will over a geographically distinct urban community. A new state proposal based in most part on boundaries formed by those Local Councils with majorities that actually wanted the change would have acquired a critical momentum.

There were some practical issues, identified by the Nicholas Royal Commission that provided compelling arguments for the inclusion of Newcastle; these were that the new state would benefit from a major port, that the railway network in the region was centered on Newcastle and excluding it would lead to problems associated with the administration of the railways, and that, under the original proposal, Newcastle would have been separated from Chichester Dam, its main water supply source. However, as the 1967 referendum later would demonstrate, support for remaining in New South Wales was strongest in Newcastle and its surrounding areas, in the more densely populated south of the proposed new state.

Maps showing new states proposals (Nicholas Royal Commission, 1934 - 1935)

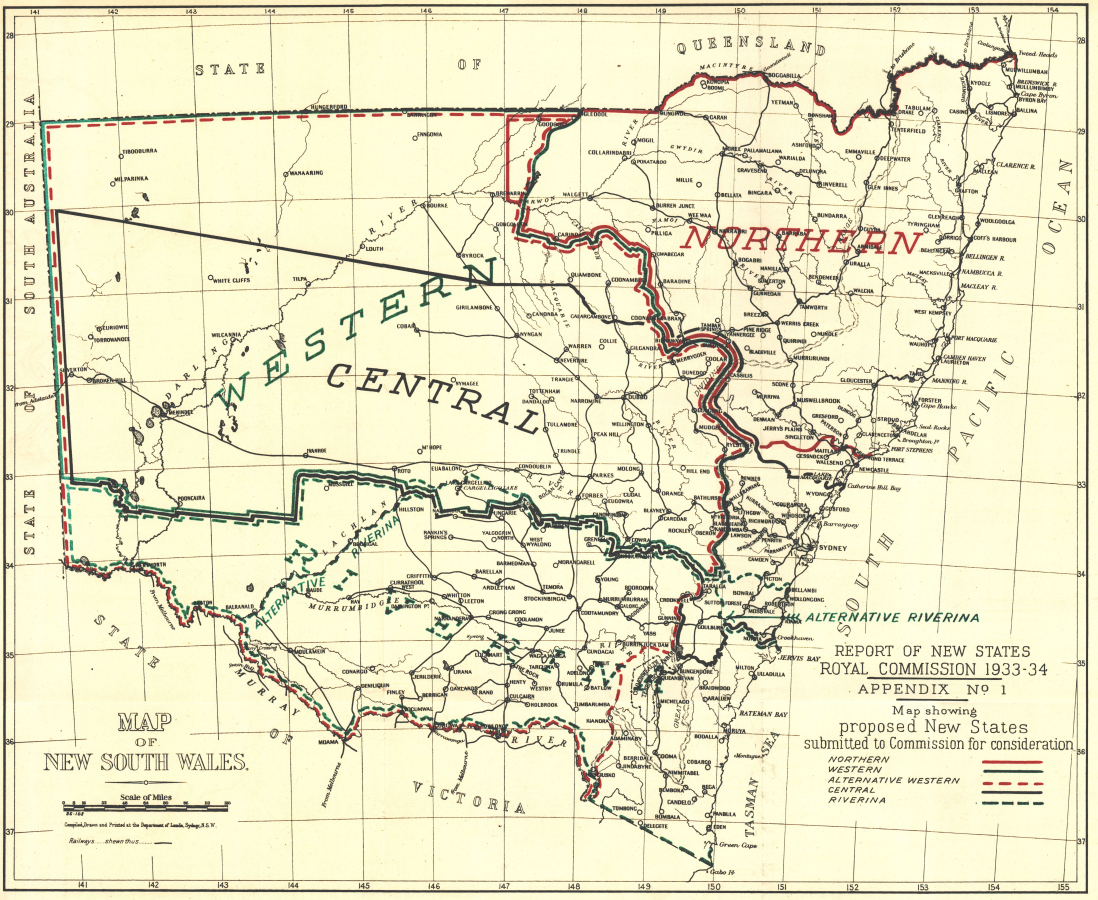
Proposals for three new states submitted to the Nicholas Royal Commission. New England ('Northern') does not include Newcastle under the main proposal. Using the most extreme combination of the various alternatives, New South Wales could consist only of Sydney, its suburbs, the Blue Mountains townships and west to Wallerawang, the Central Coast, and an area extending south to Bulli and Picton.

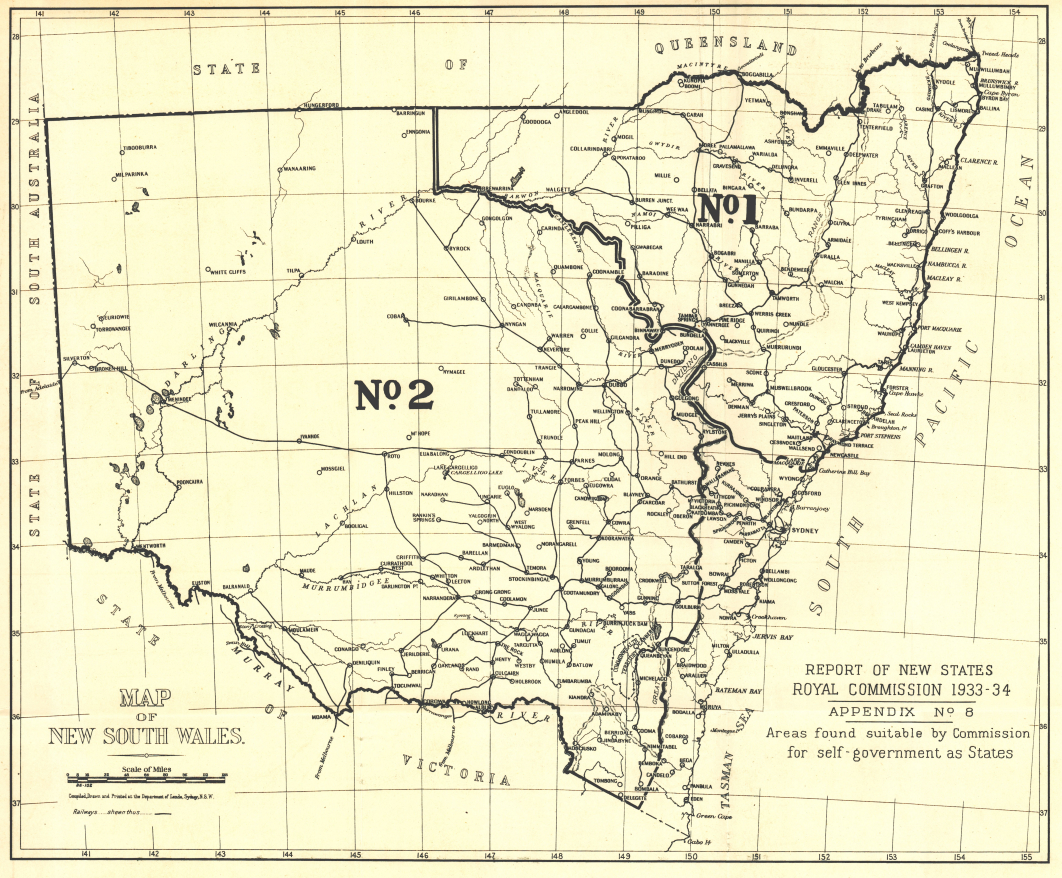
Areas that the Nicholas Royal Commission found suitable as new states. New England ('No.1') included Newcastle and Lower Hunter. Note that including Newcastle suited the separation of the existing railway network. Taken together 'No.1' and 'No.2' would have left New South Wales as a relatively small area in the south-east, almost entirely to the east of the Great Dividing Range (except around Goulburn and Crookwell).

== Referendum ==
Section 121 of the Constitution of Australia allows for the admission of states, but section 124 imposes a restriction that a "new State may be formed by separation of territory from a State, but only with the consent of the Parliament thereof". Separation would require an Act of the New South Wales Parliament, and that would not occur without, at the very least, popular support for separation within the proposed boundaries of the new state.

A referendum of New England electors was held on 29 April 1967. The 'no' vote was led by the Australian Labor Party who campaigned hard. The referendum was narrowly defeated with 54% voting 'no'. The very high 'no' vote in the Labor strongholds of Newcastle and the Lower Hunter offset the majority 'yes' vote elsewhere, although the no margin was not high. The threat of restricted access to the highly regulated Sydney milk and dairy products market also boosted the 'no' vote in rural areas.

Despite this defeat, four New State candidates stood for election at the 1968 state election and gained 0.80% of the total state vote with Garry Nehl, in the seat of Clarence, winning 35% of the primary vote. However this was a brief twilight in the campaign and, exhausted, the movement again went into decline for the next four decades.

== Practical consequences ==
Although the question of the new state's capital remained open, Armidale was both a centre of the movement and location of its conferences, and it was also the putative capital city. It was also already a cathedral city for Anglicans and Catholics, and location of a number of religious secondary schools. A site just to the south of Armidale was, up to 1904 and again in 1908, considered as a potential site for Australia's federal capital.

Supporters of the new state movement used their influence, to obtain amenities and infrastructure that would be appropriate for a new state and its capital city, using a policy of decentralisation as a justification.

When a new power station opened at Armidale in 1922, it was under the Scottish royal banner, later, in modified form, the symbol of the New State Movement. The Tamworth Power Station, opened in 1922, eventually became the centre of a power distribution grid that covered much of the New England area. Although the Electricity Commission of New South Wales (ECNSW) was established in 1950, initially the grid in the New England region remained separate. There was significant opposition from local governments in the area to the formation of the ECNSW and the potential loss of control of local electricity generation and its separate transmission network. By 1954, the Tamworth network was the last of the significant power generators that was not interconnected with the grid then controlled by the ECNSW. It was connected to the statewide grid only in 1957.

A firm supporter of the movement, Armidale's parliamentary representative and Minister for Education, David Drummond, selected Armidale as the site of the second teacher's college in New South Wales, Armidale Teachers College, in 1929. It was probably Drummond who coined the phrase "A Country College for Country Kids", and he used it effectively, seeing the college as a step towards the foundation of a university at Armidale.

The presence of secondary schools and the teachers' college in Armidale was a factor in the foundation, in 1938, of the New England University College, which was the predecessor of the University of New England. D. H. Drummond was also a prominent advocate for the University College, which was established after a donation of land and donations of funds from the community.

== 21st century revival ==
Ian Johnston's proposed flag for a New England state, which appeared in the Sydney Morning Herald on 25 January 2005

The movement underwent a resurgence in 2004, primarily in response to State (Labor) Government shire amalgamations and farmers responses to new vegetation management policies. The Annual General Meetings of NSW Farmers passed resolutions to investigate the feasibility of a non-metropolitan state in both 2004 and 2005. A task force was formed chaired by then NSWF President Mr Malcolm Peters. Some polling was commissioned and a convention was held but little further effort appears to have taken place.

A group of dedicated activists continued to agitate for a new state in the area. It was being carried out in an informal sense or through social media such as a dedicated Facebook page.

Following calls for a formal resumption of the movement by Member for New England Barnaby Joyce, and publisher of New England Times, Raphaella Kathryn Crosby, the organisation reconstituted a committee and established a new Facebook Page in August 2026.

== See also ==
- Proposals for new Australian States

== Bibliography ==
- Aitkin, D. A. (1969). The Colonel: A Political Biography of Sir Michael Bruxner. Canberra: Australian National University Press.
- Belshaw, J. D. (March 1979). "David Henry Drummond 1890–1930: the formative years". Armidale and District Historical Society Journal and Proceedings (22): 19–42.
- Belshaw, J. D. (March 1982). "Journalist, Public Agitator and Theorist, Public Servant and Historian – An obituary of Ulrich Ellis". Armidale and District Historical Society Journal and Proceedings (25): 147–160.
- Australian New States Conference. Official Report, Tamworth: Leader Print, 1922
- Drummond, D. H. (1926). "Constitutional Change in Australia: Current Problems and Contributing Factors". Glen Innes Examiner. Glen Innes.
- Drummond, D. H. (June 1931). "The New States Movement – Its basis and Objective". The Australian Quarterly. 3 (10): 46–57. doi:10.2307/20628925. JSTOR 20628925.
- Drummond, D. H. (1943). Australia's Changing Constitution: No States or New States. Sydney: Angus & Robertson.
- Drummond, D. H. (1935). Australian Dilemma. Armidale: Armidale Express Print.
- Ellis, U. R. (1933). New Australian States. Sydney: The Endeavour Press.
- Ellis, U. R. (1958). The Country Party: A Political and Social History of the Party in New South Wales. Melbourne: F W Cheshire.
- Harman, G. S. (June 1977). "New State Agitation in Northern New South Wales, 1920–1929". Journal of the Royal Australian Historical Society. 63 (Pt 1): 26–39.
- Homes, Macdonald J. (1933). The "New States" Idea and its Geographic Background. Sydney: New Century Press.
- New States Royal Commission 1933–1934: Evidence of the Royal Commission of Inquiry as to the Areas in New South Wales suitable for Self-Government as States in the Commonwealth of Australia, Sydney: Government Printer, 1934
- New States: Report of the Royal Commission of Inquiry (H. S. Nicholas) Respecting Areas in the State of New South Wales suitable for Self-Government as States in the Commonwealth of Australia, Sydney: Government Printer, 1935
- O'Hara, J. B. (April 1971). "A Doctor in the House: Earle Page 1915–1920". Armidale and District Historical Society Journal and Proceedings (14): 87–89.
- O'Hara, R. L. (December 1968). "The Influence of the Moreton Bay Separation Movement in New England and the Clarence". Armidale and Historical Society Journal and Proceedings (11): 2–19.
- Page, Earle; & others (1915). A New State: Proposed Separation of Northern New South Wales. The Case for Separation. Grafton: Examiner Print.
- Page, E. (1963). Truant Surgeon. Sydney: Angus and Robertson.
- Cohen Commission (1925), Report of the Royal Commission of Inquiry into Proposals for the Establishment of a New State or New States, formed wholly or in part out of the present territory of the State of New South Wales, Sydney: Government printer
- Richmond, K. (March 1980). "The New England New State Movement: Electoral Activity in 1968 and 1971". Armidale and District Historical Society Journal and Proceedings (23): 99, 95–111.
- Sommerlad, E.C., ed. (December 1920). Australia Subdivided. The First New State. Glen Innes: Examiner Print.
- Tapp, E. J. (November 1963). "The Colonial Origins of the New England New State Movement". The Royal Australian Historical Society Journal. 49 (pt 3): 205–221.
- Thompson, V. C. (1920). The New State embracing Northern New South Wales. Tamworth: Daily Observer Print.
- Thompson, V. C. (September 1929). "New States in Australia". The Australian Quarterly. 1 (3): 47–53. doi:10.2307/20628802. JSTOR 20628802.
- Woolmington, E R. (1968), A spatial approach to the measurement of support for the Separatist Movement in Northern NSW, Monograph Series No 2, Armidale: Department of Geography, University of New England
