= Garry Nehl =

Australian politician (1934–2023)

Garry Nehl AM

Member of the Australian Parliament for Cowper
- In office 1 December 1984 – 8 October 2001
- Preceded by: Ian Robinson
- Succeeded by: Luke Hartsuyker

Personal details
- Born: 19 February 1934 Newcastle, New South Wales, Australia
- Died: 3 October 2023 (aged 89)
- Party: National
- Spouse: Suzanne Saul (m. 1956)
- Occupation: Journalist; Public relations

Garry Owen Barr Nehl, AM (19 February 1934 – 3 October 2023) was an Australian politician. He was a member of the House of Representatives from 1984 to 2001, representing the seat of Cowper for the National Party. He served as deputy speaker from 1996 to 2001. He worked in journalism and public relations before his election to federal parliament and was a leading campaigner for New England statehood at the height of the movement in the 1960s.

== Early life ==
Nehl was born on 19 February 1934 in Newcastle, New South Wales. He was the son of Ivy and William Nehl. His father, a moulder by profession, was an Australian Army officer during World War II and served in the Battle of Tobruk.

Nehl attended Sydney Boys' High School from 1946 to 1951. He subsequently worked an office job in Sydney and also served with the Citizen Military Forces from 1952 to 1954. He moved to South West Queensland in 1956 following his marriage, working as a station hand, overseer and manager at his wife's parents' grazing property. He did not complete a university degree, although he studied economics part-time at the University of Sydney, commerce by correspondence at the University of Queensland, and arts at the University of New England.

From 1965 to 1968, Nehl worked as an administrator in the University of New England's university extension department. In 1968 he briefly ran a newspaper, Scope, in Armidale, New South Wales. He moved to Coffs Harbour later that year where he worked as a freelance journalist and life insurance salesman. He subsequently managed a migrant hostel in Melbourne from 1969 to 1971 then worked in Sydney as a public relations consultant and personnel manager with Morganite Australia. He returned to Coffs Harbour in 1976 and established a public relations firm. He also published several photographic books and was editor of Banana Bulletin, the journal of the New South Wales Banana Growers' Federation, from 1980 to 1984.

== Politics ==
Nehl joined the Country Party in 1957. He served on the Armidale City Council from 1961 to 1964.

=== New England statehood movement ===
Nehl was executive officer and secretary of the New England New State Movement from 1961 to 1964, which sought to separate the New England region of New South Wales as a new Australian state. He ran the movement's Newcastle branch and chaired the Citizens' Referendum Council during the ultimately unsuccessful 1967 New England statehood referendum. He stood for the New State Party at the 1968 New South Wales state election, polling 36 percent of the vote in the seat of Clarence but losing to the incumbent Country Party MP Bill Weiley.

=== House of Representatives ===
In 1984, Nehl won National Party preselection to contest the seat of Cowper following after incumbent Nationals MP Ian Robinson transferred to the new seat of Page. He retained Cowper for the National Party at the 1984 federal election.

Nehl held the seat until his retirement in 2001. During his time in the House of Representatives he served as the Deputy Speaker in the 1996 and 1998 Parliaments, the first five years of the John Howard premiership, under three Speakers: Bob Halverson, Ian Sinclair, and Neil Andrew.

== Personal life ==
In 1956, Nehl married Suzanne Saul, with whom he had two sons. Outside of politics he served on the board of the Royal Freemasons Benevolent Institution and as president of the Coffs Harbour Regional Conservatorium.

Nehl died on 3 October 2023, at the age of 89.

Parliament of Australia
Preceded by Ian Robinson	Member for Cowper; 1984–2001	Succeeded by Luke Hartsuyker
