= Luke Hartsuyker =

Australian politician (born 1959)

The Honourable Luke Hartsuyker
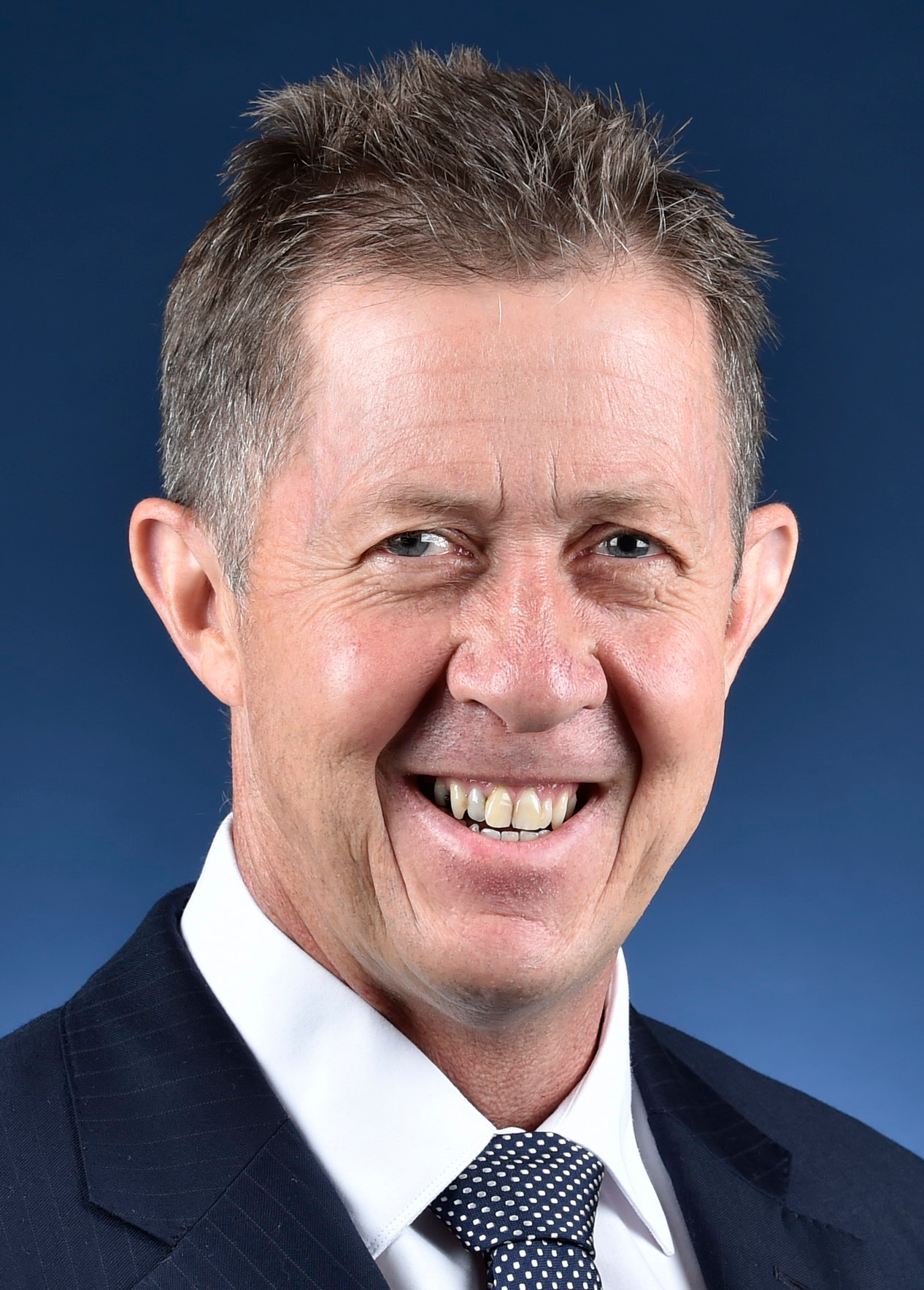

Member of the Australian Parliament for Cowper
- In office 10 November 2001 – 11 April 2019
- Preceded by: Garry Nehl
- Succeeded by: Pat Conaghan

Minister for Vocational Education and Skills
- In office 21 September 2015 – 18 February 2016
- Prime Minister: Malcolm Turnbull
- Preceded by: New ministerial post
- Succeeded by: Scott Ryan

Assistant Minister for Trade, Tourism and Investment
- In office 20 December 2017 – 5 March 2018
- Prime Minister: Malcolm Turnbull
- Preceded by: Keith Pitt
- Succeeded by: Mark Coulton

Assistant Minister to the Deputy Prime Minister
- In office 19 July 2016 – 20 December 2017
- Prime Minister: Malcolm Turnbull
- Preceded by: Keith Pitt
- Succeeded by: Damian Drum

Assistant Minister for Employment
- In office 18 September 2013 – 21 September 2015
- Prime Minister: Tony Abbott
- Preceded by: Kate Ellis
- Succeeded by: Office abolished

Personal details
- Born: 28 April 1959 (age 67) Muswellbrook, New South Wales, Australia
- Party: National
- Spouse: Irene
- Children: 2
- Education: University of Newcastle
- Occupation: Accountant and business owner
- Website: www.lukehartsuyker.com.au

Luke Hartsuyker (/ˈhɑːrtˌsuːkər/ HART-soo-kər; born 28 April 1959) is a former Australian politician who was a member of the House of Representatives from 2001 to 2019, representing the Division of Cowper in New South Wales for the National Party. He served as a government minister in the Turnbull government and an assistant minister in the Abbott government. In August 2018, he announced he would retire from parliament at the 2019 federal election.

== Background and career ==
Hartsuyker was born in Muswellbrook, New South Wales, where he attended a state primary school and state high school. His father, Tom Hartsuyker, immigrated from the Netherlands in 1951 and subsequently established a Dutch-themed tourist park in Coffs Harbour called The Clog Barn. Hartsuyker was born a Dutch citizen by descent, but automatically lost his citizenship in 1995 by failing to meet a provision requiring foreign-born citizens to return to the Netherlands every ten years.

Hartsuyker holds a Bachelor of Commerce degree from Newcastle University, and an Associate Diploma in valuation. He is a Fellow of the Chartered Practising Accountants Australia. He managed his father's business before entering politics. He and his wife, Irene, have two sons.

== Politics ==
In the 2001 federal election Hartsuyker was elected to the Division of Cowper after longstanding Nationals MP Garry Nehl retired from the seat. Hartsuyker retained the seat in subsequent elections: 2004, 2007, 2010, 2013, and 2016.

In 2008, Hartsyuker was named after refusing to leave the Chamber for holding a life-sized cardboard cutout of then-Prime Minister Kevin Rudd, which he passed on to other members of the Opposition frontbench. He was aided by Liberal MP Don Randall, who brought the cutout into the chamber.

An electoral redistribution changed Cowper's boundaries prior to the 2016 election: Port Macquarie was included in Cowper for the first time, while the region north of Coffs Harbour was transferred out of Cowper to the Division of Page.

Former Independent MP Rob Oakeshott, who lives in Port Macquarie (which had been within the Division of Lyne prior to the redistribution), contested the Division of Cowper at the 2016 election. A number of seat-level opinion polls in Cowper found the incumbent Hartsuyker and independent Oakeshott neck-and-neck on the two-party-preferred vote. Hartsuyker won re-election, but suffered a swing of 13 percent – the closest that the Nationals had come to losing Cowper in over half a century. The Nationals have held it for all but one term since 1919. While Oakeshott slashed Hartsuyker's two-party margin to 4.5%, Cowper is still a safe National seat in a "traditional" two-party matchup with Labor.

On 8 August 2018, Hartsuyker announced he would retire from federal politics at the 2019 federal election.

=== Ministerial career ===
Hartsuyker served as the Assistant Minister for Employment and as the Deputy Leader of the House in the Abbott Ministry, between 18 September 2013 and September 2015. He was the Minister for Vocational Education and Skills in the First Turnbull Ministry between September 2015 and February 2016; the Assistant Minister to the Assistant Minister to the Deputy Prime Minister between July 2016 and December 2017; and the Assistant Minister for Trade, Tourism and Investment in the Second Turnbull Ministry between December 2017 and March 2018.

=== Positions ===
Hartsuyker opposes same-sex marriage and stated he would not vote for it. A 2011 poll in the Coffs Harbour Advocate, representing those within his electorate, resulted in 78% of respondents in favour of same-sex marriage. After his electorate voted in favour of same-sex marriage in the Australian Marriage Law Postal Survey, Hartsuyker did vote in favour of the Marriage Amendment (Definition and Religious Freedoms) Act 2017.

Parliament of Australia
| Preceded by Garry Nehl | Member for Cowper; 2001–2019 | Succeeded by Pat Conaghan |
Political offices
| Preceded by Keith Pitt | Assistant Minister for Trade, Tourism and Investment; 2017–2018 | Succeeded by Mark Coulton |
| Preceded by Keith Pitt | Assistant Minister to the Deputy Prime Minister; 2016–2017 | Succeeded by Damian Drum |
| New ministerial post | Minister for Vocational Education and Skills; 2015–2016 | Succeeded by Scott Ryan |
| Preceded by Kate Ellis as Minister for Employment Participation | Assistant Minister for Employment; 2013–2015 | Ministry abolished |
