= 1967 New South Wales new state referendum =

New State referendum
- 29 April 1967
- Are you in favour of the establishment of a new State in north-east New South Wales described in schedule 1 to the New State Referendum Act 1966 ?
- Outcome: Decided in the negative

Results
Choice	Votes	%
Yes	168,103	45.82%
No	198,812	54.18%
Valid votes	366,915	94.54%
Invalid or blank votes	21,194	5.46%
Total votes	388,109	100.00%
Registered voters/turnout	419,689	92.48%
- Margin of support by district

The New State referendum was held in north-eastern New South Wales, Australia, on 29 April 1967, under the provisions of the New State Referendum Act 1966. The proposed state's boundaries were based on the findings of the 1935 Nicholas Royal Commission; only voters in this area took part. The vote marked the culmination of a decades-long campaign for a new state in the New England and Northern Rivers districts, but was ultimately defeated.

== Background ==
The first separatist agitation occurred during colonial times at the time of the separation of Queensland from NSW. While this was followed by outbreaks of agitation, these remained sporadic. Well-organised 'Separation Leagues' existed at both Glen Innes and Grafton in the late 1880s, but did not make progress.

This changed in the twentieth century. Agitation began again at Grafton towards the end of the First World War led by Earle Page, a local doctor and later a prominent politician, rising to caretaker Prime Minister of Australia. This was picked up a little later by Victor Thompson, editor of the Tamworth Northern Daily Leader who launched a sustained newspaper campaign that involved papers as far south as Cessnock in the lower Hunter. This led to the creation of a formal movement. In 1922 a formal request to the Commonwealth was made by the lower house to establish a new state in northern New South Wales. One outcome was the 1924 Cohen Royal Commission into New States.

The Cohen Commission ruled against the movement and it went into decline, resurging at the start of the Great Depression. This forced another Royal Commission, the Nicholas Commission. While this recommended in favour, the movement was again in decline as economic conditions improved.

Agitation started again at the end of the Second World War and this time was sustained by permanent staff. In 1953, 21 councils defied the state government and held unofficial referendum on the issue of a new state. The people voted overwhelmingly in favour of the referendum. In 1961 the movement launched Operation Seventh State, raising over AU£100,000. This allowed more staff and greater agitation.

== Key dates ==
Writs were issued on 31 March 1967. Polling took place on 29 April and the writ was returned on 29 May.

== Prescribed area ==
The New State Referendum Act identified a "prescribed area" in which the vote would be held. This included the electoral districts of Armidale, Barwon, Byron, Cessnock, Clarence, Gloucester, Hamilton, Kahibah, Lake Macquarie, Lismore, Maitland, Newcastle, Oxley, Raleigh, Tamworth, Tenterfield, Upper Hunter, Wallsend and Waratah. It also included the subdivisions of Gunnedah, Merriwa and Spring Ridge in Burrendong, and Baradine and Coonabarabran in Castlereagh.

== The question ==
Are you in favour of the establishment of a new state in north-east New South Wales as described in Schedule 1 to the New State Referendum Act, 1966?

== Results ==
The 'Yes' case enjoyed strong support across the New England and Northern Rivers districts, but faced overwhelming opposition in metropolitan Newcastle, the Hunter Valley and the Mid-North Coast.

Results of 1967 New State referendum
District	Result	Yes	No	Informal	Yes	No	Turnout
Armidale	Yes	10,257	6,655	868	60.65%	39.35%	91.99%
Barwon	Yes	12,149	6,015	843	66.89%	33.11%	89.35%
Burrendong (part)	Yes	4,570	2,474	339	64.88%	35.12%	92.94%
Byron	Yes	13,205	6,533	1,072	66.90%	33.10%	93.22%
Castlereagh (part)	Yes	1,719	1,528	242	52.94%	47.06%	85.26%
Cessnock	No	4,627	14,299	1,362	24.45%	75.55%	94.26%
Clarence	Yes	13,239	6,698	873	66.40%	33.60%	93.69%
Gloucester	No	4,725	12,235	1,012	27.86%	72.14%	91.79%
Hamilton	No	5,305	13,945	1,303	27.56%	72.44%	92.18%
Kahibah	No	6,233	14,098	1,320	30.66%	69.34%	93.38%
Lake Macquarie	No	5,784	12,981	1,444	30.82%	69.18%	92.66%
Lismore	Yes	13,335	5,286	735	71.61%	28.39%	92.91%
Maitland	No	5,159	14,470	1,274	26.28%	73.72%	94.11%
Newcastle	No	5,343	14,167	1,142	27.39%	72.61%	91.17%
Oxley	No	8,297	10,609	1,229	43.89%	56.11%	92.28%
Raleigh	Yes	14,965	5,404	956	73.47%	26.53%	92.57%
Tamworth	Yes	10,138	7,407	842	57.78%	42.22%	93.67%
Tenterfield	Yes	11,220	4,657	591	70.67%	29.33%	92.18%
Upper Hunter	No	6,884	11,061	795	38.36%	61.64%	92.22%
Wallsend	No	5,423	13,575	1,485	28.55%	71.45%	93.87%
Waratah	No	5,526	14,715	1,467	27.30%	72.70%	93.13%
Total	No	168,103	198,812	21,194	45.82%	54.18%	92.59%

== See also ==
- Referendums in New South Wales
- Referendums in Australia
- Northern Territory statehood referendum
