= Frank McGuren =

Australian politician

Frank McGuren OAM
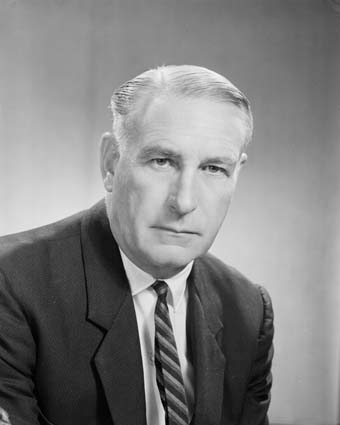

Member of the Australian Parliament for Cowper
- In office 9 December 1961 – 30 November 1963
- Preceded by: Earle Page
- Succeeded by: Ian Robinson

Personal details
- Born: 15 October 1909 Grafton, New South Wales, Australia
- Died: 13 June 1990 (aged 80)
- Party: Australian Labor Party
- Occupation: Public servant

Francis William McGuren, OAM (15 October 1909 – 13 June 1990) was an Australian politician.

== Early life and career ==
Born in Grafton, New South Wales, he was educated at St Augustine's School in Coffs Harbour. He then became a public servant, and was elected to Grafton City Council.

== Political career ==
In 1958, he was the Labor candidate for the seat of Cowper in the Australian House of Representatives, facing former caretaker Prime Minister Earle Page of the Country Party. Page had held the seat since 1919. He was the second-longest-serving federal parliamentarian in Australian history, and had skated to re-election time and again. The 1958 election was no different, and McGuren was soundly defeated.

McGuren sought a rematch in 1961. On paper, he faced very long odds. Cowper appeared to be a reasonably safe seat for Page, with an 11-point swing required for Labor to win it. However, by this time, Page was 81 years old and gravely ill with lung cancer. Although he was too sick to campaign nearly as actively as he had done before, he insisted on fighting his 17th general election anyway. McGuren led the field on the first count. On the second count, while an independent candidate's preferences flowed mostly to Page, McGuren's first-count lead was large enough for him to be elected by a slim three-point margin – a 13-point swing to the ALP, and one of the largest upsets in Australian political history. Page died 11 days later, without knowing that he had been defeated. McGuren's win was part of a 15-seat swing to Labor which almost brought down the government of Sir Robert Menzies.

However, McGuren's tenure was short-lived. At the 1963 election, he was narrowly defeated by the Country Party's Ian Robinson on the first count, as the Menzies-led Coalition recovered many of the seats it had lost two years earlier.

He died in 1990.

Parliament of Australia
Preceded by Earle Page	Member for Cowper; 1961 – 1963	Succeeded by Ian Robinson
