= Division of Cowper =

Australian federal electoral division

Coordinates: 30.384°S 152.870°E

Cowper Australian House of Representatives Division
- Interactive map of electorate boundaries from the 2025 federal election
- Created: 1901
- MP: Pat Conaghan
- Party: Nationals
- Namesake: Sir Charles Cowper
- Electors: 131,719 (2025)
- Area: 7,271 km^{2} (2,807.3 sq mi)
- Demographic: Provincial
Electorates around Cowper:
New England	Page	Pacific Ocean
New England	Cowper	Pacific Ocean
New England	Lyne	Pacific Ocean

The Division of Cowper is an Australian electoral division in the state of New South Wales. It stretches along the coast comprising the cities of Port Macquarie and Coffs Harbour.

Since 2019, its MP has been Pat Conaghan of the National Party.

== Geography ==
Cowper is located on the Mid North Coast of New South Wales. It includes the local government areas of Kempsey, Nambucca Valley and Bellingen, along with most of the City of Coffs Harbour, including Coffs Harbour and the towns and localities of Boambee, Bonville, Crossmaglen, Karangi, Lowanna, Sawtell, Toormina, Ulong and Upper Orara.

Since 1984, federal electoral division boundaries in Australia have been determined at redistributions by a redistribution committee appointed by the Australian Electoral Commission. Redistributions occur for the boundaries of divisions in a particular state, and they occur every seven years, or sooner if a state's representation entitlement changes or when divisions of a state are malapportioned.

== History ==
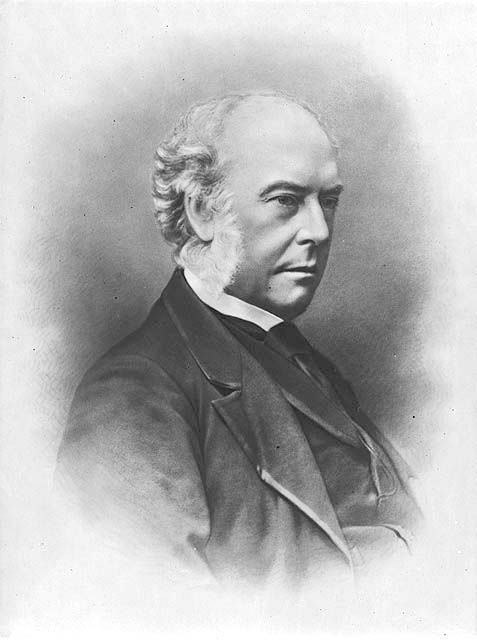
Sir Charles Cowper, the division's namesake

The division was created in 1900 and was one of the original 65 divisions contested at the first federal election. It is named after Sir Charles Cowper, an early Premier of New South Wales.

Except for one brief break, the seat has been held by the National Party (previously known as the Country Party) and its predecessors since 1919. Its most prominent member has been Sir Earle Page, former leader of the Country Party and interim Prime Minister of Australia in 1939. He represented Cowper from 1919 to 1961, longer than any other MP who represented one seat for his entire career. It has usually been a fairly safe National Party seat, and became more so when its more urbanised area (including Page's hometown of Grafton) was shifted to the newly created Division of Page in 1984.

The division is located on the north coast of New South Wales, and on its current boundaries takes in the towns of Coffs Harbour, Port Macquarie, Kempsey, Macksville and Nambucca Heads.

In February 2016, New South Wales federal electoral districts were redistributed. The northern parts of Cowper, from Sapphire Beach to Red Rock were shifted to the division of Page. Since the 2019 election, the member for Cowper has been Pat Conaghan, representing the National Party of Australia.

== Members ==
Image	Member	Party	Term	Notes
	Francis Clarke (1857–1939)	Protectionist	30 March 1901 – 16 December 1903	Previously held the New South Wales Legislative Assembly seat of Hastings and Macleay. Served as Chief Government Whip in the House under Deakin. Lost seat
	Henry Lee (1856–1927)	Free Trade	16 December 1903 – 1906	Lost seat
	Henry Lee (1856–1927)	Anti-Socialist	1906 – 12 December 1906	Lost seat
	John Thomson (1862–1934)	Protectionist	12 December 1906 – 26 May 1909	Previously held the New South Wales Legislative Assembly seat of Manning. Served as Chief Government Whip in the House under Hughes. Lost seat
	John Thomson (1862–1934)	Liberal	26 May 1909 – 17 February 1917	Previously held the New South Wales Legislative Assembly seat of Manning. Served as Chief Government Whip in the House under Hughes. Lost seat
	John Thomson (1862–1934)	Nationalist	17 February 1917 – 13 December 1919	Previously held the New South Wales Legislative Assembly seat of Manning. Served as Chief Government Whip in the House under Hughes. Lost seat
	(Sir) Earle Page (1880–1961)	Farmers and Settlers' Association	13 December 1919 – 22 January 1920	Served as minister under Bruce, Lyons, Menzies and Fadden. Served as Prime Minister in 1939. Lost seat
	(Sir) Earle Page (1880–1961)	Country	22 January 1920 – 9 December 1961	Served as minister under Bruce, Lyons, Menzies and Fadden. Served as Prime Minister in 1939. Lost seat
	Frank McGuren (1909–1990)	Labor	9 December 1961 – 30 November 1963	Lost seat
	Ian Robinson (1925–2017)	Country	30 November 1963 – 2 May 1975	Previously held the New South Wales Legislative Assembly seat of Casino. Transferred to the Division of Page
	Ian Robinson (1925–2017)	National Country	2 May 1975 – 16 October 1982	Previously held the New South Wales Legislative Assembly seat of Casino. Transferred to the Division of Page
	Ian Robinson (1925–2017)	Nationals	16 October 1982 – 1 December 1984	Previously held the New South Wales Legislative Assembly seat of Casino. Transferred to the Division of Page
	Garry Nehl (1934–2023)	Nationals	1 December 1984 – 8 October 2001	Retired
	Luke Hartsuyker (1959–)	Nationals	10 November 2001 – 11 April 2019	Served as minister under Turnbull. Retired
	Pat Conaghan (1971–)	Nationals	18 May 2019 – present	Incumbent

== Election results ==
2025 Australian federal election: Cowper
Party	Candidate	Votes	%	±%
National	Pat Conaghan	40,836	37.90	−1.62
Independent	Caz Heise	31,616	29.35	+3.18
Labor	Greg Vigors	12,713	11.80	−2.20
One Nation	Chris Walsh	6,856	6.36	−1.81
Legalise Cannabis	Megan Mathew	5,210	4.84	+4.84
Greens	Wendy Firefly	4,552	4.23	−1.62
Family First	Peter Jackel	1,851	1.72	+1.72
Trumpet of Patriots	Geoffrey Shannon	1,551	1.44	+1.44
Libertarian	Paul Templeton	1,403	1.30	−2.58
Independent	Zeke Daley	892	0.83	+0.83
Fusion	Geoffrey Marlow	255	0.24	+0.24
Total formal votes		107,735	90.08	−4.99
Informal votes		11,864	9.92	+4.99
Turnout		119,599	90.85	+2.18
Notional two-party-preferred count
National	Pat Conaghan	63,646	59.08	−0.45
Labor	Greg Vigors	44,089	40.92	+0.45
Two-candidate-preferred result
National	Pat Conaghan	56,609	52.54	+0.14
Independent	Caz Heise	51,126	47.46	−0.14
National hold		Swing	+0.14	
