= The Coff's Harbour Advocate =

New South Wales, Australia newspaper

The Coff's Harbour Advocate, front page, 12 February 1907

The Coff's Harbour Advocate was a weekly English language newspaper published from 1907 to 1972 in Coff's Harbour, New South Wales, Australia. It was also known as The Advocate, and The Coff's Harbour and Dorrigo Advocate.

== History ==
The paper was established on 12 February 1907 by Elizabeth May Campbell, with the assistance of Robert Clyde Packer. The full text of the masthead read: The Coff's Harbour Advocate and Dorrigo, Orara, Coramba, Bucca Bucca, Woolgoogla, Glenreagh and Lower Clarence Advertiser. The Sun's press at Bellingen was initially used to print the paper.

In 1972 the paper was renamed The Advocate, published by the North Coast News. On 28 February 1984 the title reverted to The Coff's Harbour Advocate.

== Digitisation ==
The Coff's Harbour Advocate has been digitised as part of the Australian Newspapers Digitisation Program of the National Library of Australia.

== See also ==
- List of newspapers in New South Wales
