= John Reid (Australian politician) =

Australian politician

Personal details
- Born: 1 August 1873 Shellharbour, New South Wales
- Died: 30 December 1963 (aged 90) Sydney
- Party: Country Party

John Thomas Reid (1 August 1873 – 30 December 1963) was an Australian politician. He was a member of the New South Wales Legislative Assembly from 1930 until 1963 and a member of the Country Party.

Reid was born in Shellharbour, New South Wales and was the son of a dairy farmer. He was educated to elementary level and initially worked as a farm hand. He later became a dairy farmer and was involved in local dairy co-operative organizations in the Casino, New South Wales district before living permanently in Sydney after 1943. He was elected as a Councillor to Kyogle Council in 1920–25 . Reid was elected to the New South Wales Parliament as the Country Party member for the new seat of Casino at the 1930 state election. He held the seat for the next 7 elections but was defeated by Ian Robinson, who also represented the Country Party at the 1953 state election. Reid was approaching the age of 80 at the time and there was some local feeling that he should make way for younger blood. Rather than force his retirement the party executive allowed for multiple endorsements and he was defeated by Robertson. Reid did not hold party, parliamentary or ministerial positions.

New South Wales Legislative Assembly
Preceded by new seat	Member for Casino; 1930–1953	Succeeded by Ian Robinson
