= Nicholas Royal Commission =

The Royal Commission of Inquiry Respecting Areas in the State of New South Wales Suitable for Self-Government as States in the Commonwealth of Australia, commonly known as the Nicholas Royal Commission, was appointed in 1933 to determine the suitability of regions of New South Wales to become federal States in their own right. The Commission, led by Justice H.S. Nicholas, found that both the New England region and Western NSW could support themselves as independent states. However, no action was taken as a result of his findings.

Nicholas was appointed sole commissioner on 25 August 1933, to report on the New States Royal Commission. A preliminary sitting of the Commission was held in Sydney on 18 October 1933, with representations from the following movements: The New England Movement, The Western Division of the United Country Movement, The Riverina Division of the United Country Movement, The Federal Reconstruction Movement, and The NSW Unity Movement, with each speaking in favour of subdivision.

Subsequently the Royal Commission examined the functions of the state, the distribution of revenue, the civil service, distribution of assets and liabilities, and tests of suitability. The proposed states were assessed in terms of the nature of boundaries, size of area, population, nature of production and resources, community interests and means of communication.

The Report found that two areas would be suitable for self-government as States within the Commonwealth of Australia, a northern region, and a central, western and southern region, with descriptions of the boundaries of each region listed. A referendum was recommended in each of the proposed areas, with electors informed of the questions at issue, and of facts relating to the advantages and disadvantages of subdivision.

Maps showing new states proposals (Nicholas Royal Commission, 1934 - 1935)

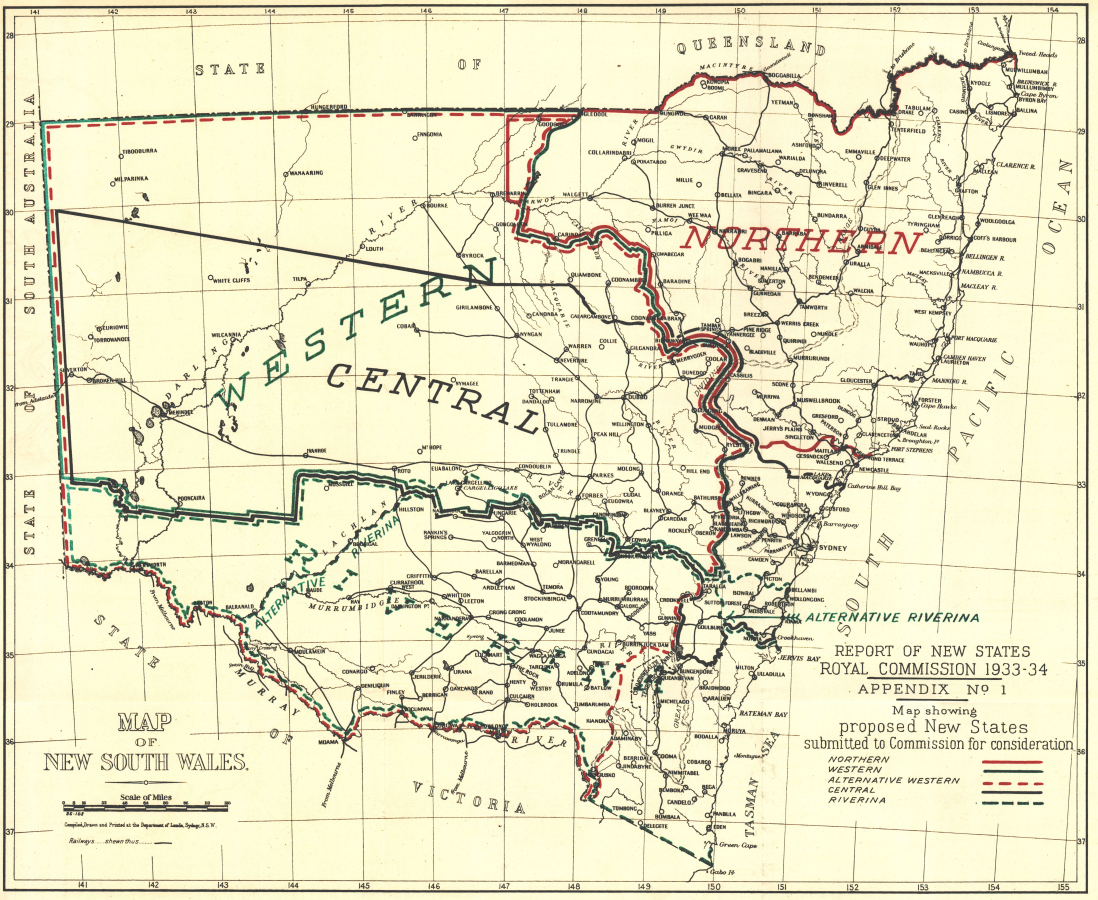
Proposals for three new states submitted to the Nicholas Royal Commission. New England ('Northern') does not include Newcastle under the main proposal. Using the most extreme combination of the various alternatives, New South Wales could consist only of Sydney, its suburbs, the Blue Mountains townships and west to Wallerawang, the Central Coast, and an area extending south to Bulli and Picton.

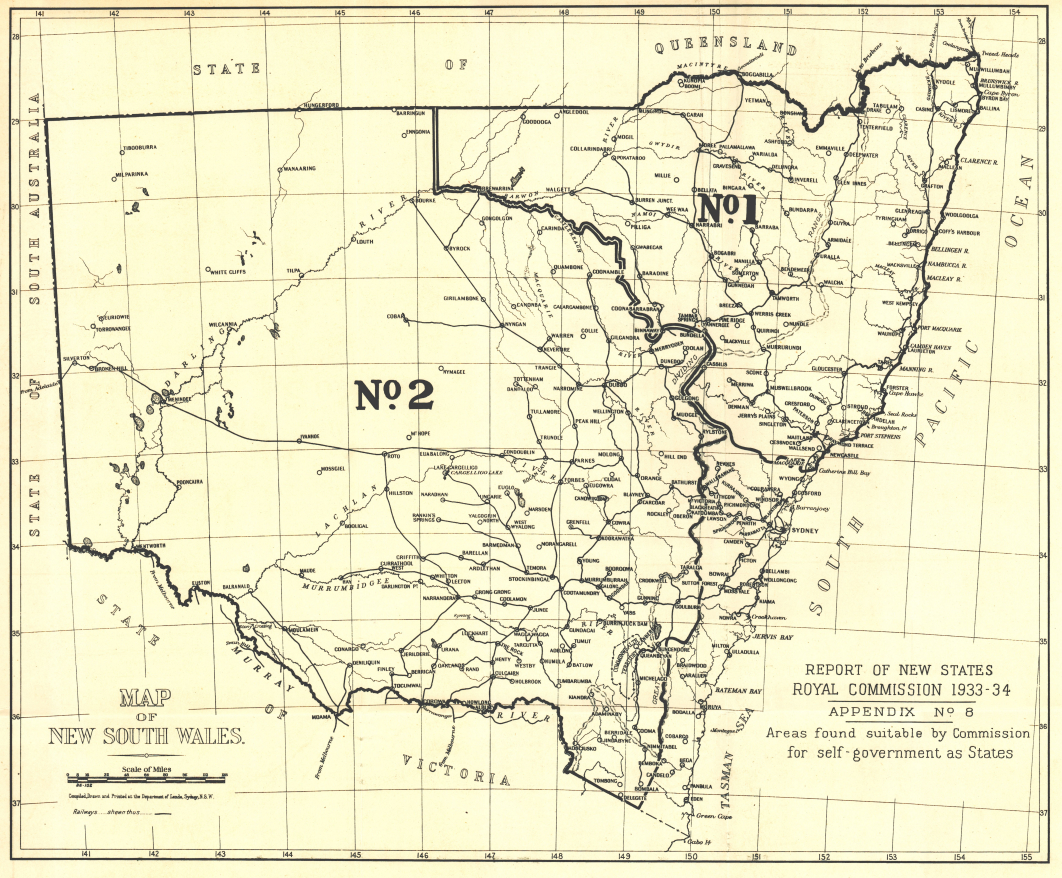
Areas that the Nicholas Royal Commission found suitable as new states. New England ('No.1') includes Newcastle and the Lower Hunter. Note that including Newcastle suits the separation of the existing railway network. Taken together 'No.1' and 'No.2' would have left New South Wales as a relatively small area in the south-east, almost entirely to the east of the Great Dividing Range (except around Goulburn and Crookwell).
