= Pat Conaghan =

Australian politician

Pat Conaghan MP
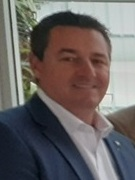
- Conaghan in 2022

Member of the Australian Parliament for Cowper
- Incumbent
- Assumed office 18 May 2019
- Preceded by: Luke Hartsuyker

Councillor of North Sydney Council for Tunks Ward
- In office 27 March 2004 – 13 September 2008

Personal details
- Born: Patrick John Conaghan; 31 January 1971 (age 55) Kempsey, New South Wales, Australia
- Party: The Nationals
- Education: St Joseph's College, Hunters Hill
- Alma mater: University of New England (LLB)
- Occupation: Lawyer, police officer
- Website: patconaghan.com.au

Patrick John Conaghan (born 31 January 1971) is an Australian politician. He has been a member of the House of Representatives for Cowper in New South Wales, representing the Nationals since 2019.

== Early career ==
Conaghan was born in Kempsey, New South Wales and was educated at St Joseph's College, Hunters Hill in Sydney.

Prior to entering federal politics, he worked as a police officer in Kempsey before being transferred to Sydney as a detective and later on as a police prosecutor. He was also a councillor for Tunks Ward of North Sydney Council from 2004 to 2008, serving alongside future Member for North Sydney, Trent Zimmerman. After departing law enforcement, Conaghan became a lawyer and established his own practice specialising in criminal defence, Conaghan Lawyers before being elected.

== Politics ==
Conaghan was elected to the Australian House of Representatives for the electoral division of Cowper at the 2019 Australian federal election, succeeding retiring incumbent Luke Hartsuyker.

In August 2022, Conaghan attracted media attention after remarks about Australian Greens MP Max Chandler-Mather for not wearing a tie in Parliament House and objecting to the "state of undress". Conaghan would continue to complain about the MP's attire despite Speaker Milton Dick's dismissal of the concern and would later say in a statement that "This is not a barbecue. This is question time in the Australian parliament. What next, board shorts and thongs? Maybe a onesie in winter". According to the House of Representatives Practice rulebook, attire is at discretion of the Speaker in the House of Representatives.

In 2023, Conaghan conducted a survey, titled Pat's Biggest Survey 2023, where respondents from Cowper were polled about national issues. The poll showed high levels of support in Cowper for celebrating Australia Day on 26 January and nuclear power.

Parliament of Australia
Preceded by Luke Hartsuyker	Member for Cowper; 2019–present	Incumbent
