= Richmond Manyweathers =

Australian politician

Richmond William Manyweathers OBE (29 January 1907 – 30 March 1989) was an Australian politician. He was a Country Party member of the New South Wales Legislative Assembly, representing the electorate of Casino from 1964 to 1968. He subsequently transferred to the New South Wales Legislative Council, where he served from 1968 to 1978.

Manyweathers was born in Lismore, and was educated at Casino Rural School. He began working in his family's furniture business in 1921, working there until his election to the Legislative Council in 1968. He saw service in the South Pacific during World War II, serving in the Royal Australian Air Force from 1942 until 1945. He was involved in both local businesses and community organisations, serving as a director of NR11 and 8TV Limited and the Casino Co-operative Building Society, and serving as president of the Casino and District Historical Society and as a trustee of the Casino School of Arts.

Manyweathers was elected to the Casino council in 1946, serving until 1968, including a lengthy stint as mayor from 1948 until 1965. He was elected to the Legislative Assembly for the safe Country Party seat of Casino at a 1964 by-election, after the local member, Ian Robinson, resigned to enter federal politics. He was re-elected at the 1965 election, but his seat of Casino was abolished in 1968. He subsequently switched to the Legislative Council at the conclusion of his term, being elected to a casual vacancy in April 1968. He served for ten years, including a period as Country Party Whip in the Legislative Council.

He was appointed an Officer of the Order of the British Empire in 1976, and retired from politics in 1978.

Manyweathers died at Casino in 1989.

New South Wales Legislative Assembly
Preceded by Ian Robinson	Member for Casino; 1964 – 1968	Succeeded by Seat abolished
