= Electoral district of Casino =

State electoral district of New South Wales, Australia

Casino was an electoral district of the Legislative Assembly in the Australian state of New South Wales originally created in 1930 and named after Casino. The 1929 redistribution increased the number of seats in the rural zone, and Casino was created from parts of Tenterfield and Clarence both of which were held by the Country Party. It was abolished in 1968, recreated in 1971 and abolished again in 1981.

== Members for Casino ==
First incarnation (1930–1968)
Member	Party	Term
John Reid	Country	1930–1953
Ian Robinson	Country	1953–1963
Richmond Manyweathers	Country	1964–1968
Second incarnation (1971–1981)
Member	Party	Term
Don Day	Labor	1971–1981

== Election results ==
1978 New South Wales state election: Casino
Party	Candidate	Votes	%	±%
Labor	Don Day	12,937	57.8	+7.9
National Country	Colin Sullivan	6,173	27.6	+27.6
National Country	William Marshall	2,895	12.9	+12.9
Independent	Peter Den Exter	367	1.6	+1.6
Total formal votes		22,372	98.8	−0.3
Informal votes		273	1.2	+0.3
Turnout		22,645	94.5	−0.1
Two-party-preferred result
Labor	Don Day	13,345	59.7	+8.1
National Country	Colin Sullivan	9,025	40.3	−8.1
Labor hold		Swing	+8.1	
