= Ian Robinson (Australian politician) =

Australian politician

The Honourable Ian Robinson OAM
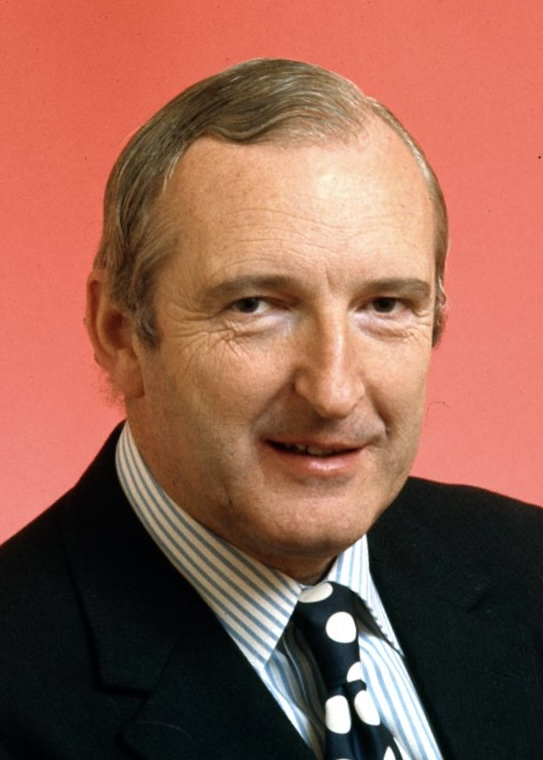

Member of the Australian Parliament for Cowper
- In office 30 November 1963 – 1 December 1984
- Preceded by: Frank McGuren
- Succeeded by: Garry Nehl

Member of the Australian Parliament for Page
- In office 1 December 1984 – 24 March 1990
- Preceded by: New seat
- Succeeded by: Harry Woods

Personal details
- Born: 27 March 1925 Coraki, New South Wales
- Died: 23 March 2017 (aged 91) Grafton, New South Wales
- Party: National Party of Australia
- Occupation: Dairy farmer, company director

Ian Louis Robinson OAM (27 March 1925 – 23 March 2017) was an Australian politician.

Born in Coraki, New South Wales, he was educated at state schools before becoming a dairy farmer, a journalist and company director. In 1953 he was elected to the New South Wales Legislative Assembly as the Country Party member for Casino, holding the seat until 1963, when he retired to contest the Australian House of Representatives seat of Cowper. Cowper had been won in 1961 by Labor's Frank McGuren, who had defeated the ailing longtime Country Party member and former caretaker Prime Minister Earle Page, who had been too ill to campaign. Robinson defeated McGuren, and became Assistant Minister assisting the Postmaster-General, Alan Hulme, on 20 August 1971. Robinson lost the position when the Coalition was defeated in the 1972 federal election. He held Cowper until 1984, when he transferred to the new seat of Page, which had absorbed much of the urbanised portion of Cowper. He held Page until 1990, when he was defeated by Labor's Harry Woods.

Robinson died on 23 March 2017, aged 91. He was awarded the Medal of the Order of Australia in the 2017 Queen's Birthday Honours for "service to the Parliaments of Australia and New South Wales". The award was announced posthumously, but he had accepted it before his death.

New South Wales Legislative Assembly
Preceded by John Reid	Member for Casino; 1953–1963	Succeeded by Richmond Manyweathers
Parliament of Australia
Preceded by Frank McGuren	Member for Cowper; 1963–1984	Succeeded by Garry Nehl
Preceded by new seat	Member for Page; 1984–1990	Succeeded by Harry Woods
