= Results of the 1996 Australian federal election in New South Wales =

1996 Australian federal election (New South Wales)
- 2 March 1996

All 50 New South Wales seats in the Australian House of Representatives and 6 seats in the Australian Senate
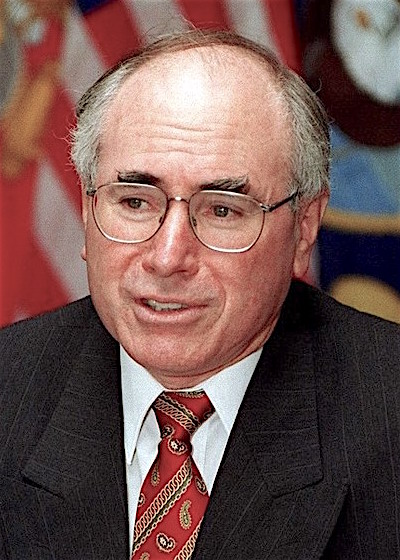

	First party	Second party
Leader	John Howard	Paul Keating
Party	Liberal/National coalition	Labor
Last election	16 seats	33 seats
Seats won	29 seats	20 seats
Seat change	▲13	▼13
Popular vote	1,742,965	1,453,542
Percentage	45.6%	39.6%
Swing	▲4.0	▼8.7
TPP	52.56%	47.44%
TPP swing	▲6.95	▼6.95

This is a list of electoral division results for the Australian 1996 federal election in the state of New South Wales.

== Overall results ==
Turnout 96.4% (CV) — Informal 3.6%
Party	Votes	%	Swing	Seats	Change
Liberal	1,229,423	33.46	+1.69	19	▲11
National	443,542	12.07	+2.32	10	▲2
Liberal/National Coalition	1,672,965	45.53	+4.01	29	▲13
Labor	1,453,542	39.56	-8.76	20	▼13
Democrats	240,255	6.54	+3.73		
Greens	92,549	2.52	+1.44		
Independents	88,509	2.41		1	Steady
AAFI	52,128	1.42	+1.37		
Christian Democrats	34,108	0.93	+0.31		
No Aircraft Noise	18,626	0.51			
Natural Law	11,252	0.31	–0.35		
Reclaim Australia	5,487	0.15			
Women's Party	1,708	0.05			
Total	3,674,209			50	
Two-party-preferred vote
Liberal/National Coalition	1,922,165	52.56	+6.95	29	▲13
Labor	1,734,777	47.44	-6.95	20	▼13
Invalid/blank votes	138,157	3.62			
Turnout	3,812,366	96.37			
Registered voters	3,955,782				
Source: Federal Elections 1996

== Results by division ==
=== Banks ===
This section is an excerpt from Electoral results for the Division of Banks § 1996

1996 Australian federal election: Banks
Party	Candidate	Votes	%	±%
Labor	Daryl Melham	31,878	43.56	−11.25
Liberal	David Sparkes	28,903	39.49	+4.77
Democrats	Alison Bailey	5,566	7.60	+4.03
AAFI	Gregg West	3,797	5.19	+5.19
Independent	Don Thompson	2,076	2.84	+2.84
Independent	John Kayes	970	1.33	+1.33
Total formal votes		73,190	95.75	−0.85
Informal votes		3,246	4.25	+0.85
Turnout		76.436	96.85	+0.40
Two-party-preferred result
Labor	Daryl Melham	37,442	51.41	−9.13
Liberal	David Sparkes	35,391	48.59	+9.13
Labor hold		Swing	−9.13	

=== Barton ===
This section is an excerpt from Electoral results for the Division of Barton § 1996

1996 Australian federal election: Barton
Party	Candidate	Votes	%	±%
Labor	Robert McClelland	35,943	48.38	−7.54
Liberal	Arthur Santorinios	30,582	41.17	+3.29
Democrats	Craig Chung	4,026	5.42	+2.91
Call to Australia	Chris D McLean	2,381	3.20	+1.70
Independent	Safwan Nasser	1,359	1.83	+1.83
Total formal votes		74,291	95.71	−0.25
Informal votes		3,328	4.29	+0.25
Turnout		77,619	96.81	+0.50
Two-party-preferred result
Labor	Robert McClelland	40,250	54.34	−5.05
Liberal	Arthur Santorinios	33,817	45.66	+5.05
Labor hold		Swing	−5.05	

=== Bennelong ===
This section is an excerpt from Electoral results for the Division of Bennelong § 1996

1996 Australian federal election: Bennelong
Party	Candidate	Votes	%	±%
Liberal	John Howard	40,589	53.83	+3.71
Labor	Wendy Mahon	24,248	32.16	−9.49
Democrats	Suzanne Reddy	4,700	6.23	+0.95
AAFI	Paul Kemp	1,968	2.61	+2.61
Greens	Jamie Parker	1,861	2.47	+2.47
No Aircraft Noise	Robert Shaw	1,305	1.73	+1.73
Natural Law	Tim Carr	227	0.30	−0.23
Independent	John Dawson	208	0.28	−1.38
Independent	Julien Paul Droulers	187	0.25	+0.25
Independent	James Bernard	111	0.15	+0.15
Total formal votes		75,404	96.18	−1.04
Informal votes		2,994	3.82	+1.04
Turnout		78,398	96.75	+0.42
Two-party-preferred result
Liberal	John Howard	45,128	60.13	+6.95
Labor	Wendy Mahon	29,918	39.87	−6.95
Liberal hold		Swing	+6.95	

=== Berowra ===
This section is an excerpt from Electoral results for the Division of Berowra § 1996

1996 Australian federal election: Berowra
Party	Candidate	Votes	%	±%
Liberal	Philip Ruddock	45,310	58.60	+3.38
Labor	Nola McCarroll	16,666	21.55	−7.23
Democrats	Simon Disney	5,751	7.44	+7.44
Independent	Mick Gallagher	5,034	6.51	−7.99
Greens	Christopher Connolly	2,453	3.17	+3.17
AAFI	Steve Martin van Wyk	1,964	2.54	+2.54
Natural Law	Bill Scally	143	0.18	−1.31
Total formal votes		77,321	97.19	−0.26
Informal votes		2,233	2.81	+0.26
Turnout		79,554	96.59	+0.26
Two-party-preferred result
Liberal	Philip Ruddock	52,526	68.40	+6.20
Labor	Nola McCarroll	24,268	31.60	−6.20
Liberal hold		Swing	+6.20	

=== Blaxland ===
This section is an excerpt from Electoral results for the Division of Blaxland § 1996

1996 Australian federal election: Blaxland
Party	Candidate	Votes	%	±%
Labor	Paul Keating	41,444	58.71	−10.69
Liberal	Nick Korovin	21,916	31.05	+6.80
Democrats	Jeffrey Meikle	2,442	3.46	+1.47
AAFI	Michael Lavis	1,944	2.75	+2.75
Call to Australia	Melodie Rahme	936	1.33	+0.17
Independent	Peter Sayegh	695	0.98	+0.98
Independent	Eric Lawrence	526	0.75	+0.75
Independent	Marc Aussie-Stone	267	0.38	+0.09
	Nick Beams	244	0.35	+0.35
Natural Law	Peter Smith	176	0.25	−0.29
Total formal votes		70,590	93.38	−1.59
Informal votes		5,005	6.62	+1.59
Turnout		75,595	96.06	+0.55
Two-party-preferred result
Labor	Paul Keating	44,328	62.98	−9.12
Liberal	Nick Korovin	26,056	37.02	+9.12
Labor hold		Swing	−9.12	

=== Bradfield ===
This section is an excerpt from Electoral results for the Division of Bradfield § 1996

1996 Australian federal election: Bradfield
Party	Candidate	Votes	%	±%
Liberal	Brendan Nelson	48,260	64.75	−5.02
Labor	Alex Kemeny	11,779	15.80	−6.56
Democrats	Ann Barry	6,908	9.27	+2.99
Greens	Richard Wright	2,577	3.46	+3.46
AAFI	Len Watkins	2,571	3.45	+3.45
Call to Australia	Margaret Ratcliffe	1,307	1.75	+1.75
Independent	Patrick Gallagher	918	1.23	+1.23
Natural Law	Mark Toomey	216	0.29	−1.30
Total formal votes		74,536	97.07	−0.38
Informal votes		2,252	2.93	+0.38
Turnout		76,788	96.45	+0.20
Two-party-preferred result
Liberal	Brendan Nelson	55,986	75.77	+2.72
Labor	Alex Kemeny	17,908	24.23	−2.72
Liberal hold		Swing	−2.72	

=== Calare ===
This section is an excerpt from Electoral results for the Division of Calare § 1996

1996 Australian federal election: Calare
Party	Candidate	Votes	%	±%
Independent	Peter Andren	21,708	29.37	+29.37
Labor	Rob Allen	21,407	28.96	−22.04
National	Trevor Toole	15,371	20.79	−5.22
Liberal	Ray Fardell	11,631	15.73	−2.79
Call to Australia	Bruce McLean	1,459	1.97	+1.97
Greens	Sharon Mullin	1,312	1.77	+1.77
Democrats	Peter Baker	859	1.16	+1.16
Natural Law	Richard Nolan	172	0.23	+0.23
Total formal votes		73,919	97.77	−0.40
Informal votes		1,687	2.23	+0.40
Turnout		75,606	96.82	−0.11
Notional two-party-preferred count
National	Trevor Toole	38,800	52.91	+6.97
Labor	Rob Allen	34,538	47.09	−6.97
Two-candidate-preferred result
Independent	Peter Andren	46,666	63.32	+63.32
National	Trevor Toole	27,037	36.68	−9.22
Independent gain from Labor		Swing	N/A	

=== Charlton ===
This section is an excerpt from Electoral results for the Division of Charlton § 1996

1996 Australian federal election: Charlton
Party	Candidate	Votes	%	±%
Labor	Bob Brown	38,665	50.00	−10.91
Liberal	Peter Craig	25,884	33.47	+6.64
Democrats	Lyn Godfrey	6,494	8.40	+2.98
Greens	Bernadette Brugman	3,863	5.00	+5.00
AAFI	Ron Franks	2,428	3.14	+3.14
Total formal votes		77,334	96.55	−0.22
Informal votes		2,767	3.45	+0.22
Turnout		80,101	97.34	+0.11
Two-party-preferred result
Labor	Bob Brown	45,646	59.32	−7.78
Liberal	Peter Craig	31,298	40.68	+7.78
Labor hold		Swing	−7.78	

=== Chifley ===
This section is an excerpt from Electoral results for the Division of Chifley § 1996

1996 Australian federal election: Chifley
Party	Candidate	Votes	%	±%
Labor	Roger Price	42,804	57.95	−10.11
Liberal	Jenny Green	19,828	26.85	+6.14
Democrats	Alec Fisher	6,682	9.05	+9.05
Call to Australia	Shirley Grigg	2,033	2.75	+2.75
Independent	Andrew Owen	1,858	2.52	+2.52
Natural Law	Louise Hargreaves	653	0.88	+0.88
Total formal votes		73,858	94.74	−0.50
Informal votes		4,098	5.26	+0.50
Turnout		77,956	96.04	+0.63
Two-party-preferred result
Labor	Roger Price	47,513	64.54	−8.04
Liberal	Jenny Green	26,109	35.46	+8.04
Labor hold		Swing	−8.04	

=== Cook ===
This section is an excerpt from Electoral results for the Division of Cook § 1996

1996 Australian federal election: Cook
Party	Candidate	Votes	%	±%
Liberal	Stephen Mutch	41,601	55.10	+5.52
Labor	Mark McGrath	23,704	31.40	−9.07
Democrats	Terri Richardson	6,130	8.12	+5.12
Reclaim Australia	Janey Woodger	2,988	3.96	+3.96
Independent	James Ian McDonald	1,078	1.43	+1.43
Total formal votes		75,501	97.52	+0.01
Informal votes		1,922	2.48	−0.01
Turnout		77,423	96.77	−0.02
Two-party-preferred result
Liberal	Stephen Mutch	46,791	62.28	+8.81
Labor	Mark McGrath	28,343	37.72	−8.81
Liberal hold		Swing	+8.81	

=== Cowper ===
This section is an excerpt from Electoral results for the Division of Cowper § 1996

1996 Australian federal election: Cowper
Party	Candidate	Votes	%	±%
National	Garry Nehl	40,825	56.30	+8.24
Labor	Paul Sekfy	23,195	31.98	−7.12
Greens	Jillian Cranny	4,525	6.24	+1.56
Democrats	Allan Quartly	3,974	5.48	+1.89
Total formal votes		72,519	97.70	−0.13
Informal votes		1,709	2.30	+0.13
Turnout		74,228	96.19	+0.37
Two-party-preferred result
National	Garry Nehl	44,465	61.56	+7.50
Labor	Paul Sekfy	27,766	38.44	−7.50
National hold		Swing	+7.50	

=== Cunningham ===
This section is an excerpt from Electoral results for the Division of Cunningham § 1996

1996 Australian federal election: Cunningham
Party	Candidate	Votes	%	±%
Labor	Stephen Martin	37,267	52.59	−6.00
Liberal	Philip Williams	21,124	29.81	+3.45
Greens	Will Douglas	4,139	5.84	+1.13
Democrats	Mark Chilton	3,535	4.99	+0.86
Call to Australia	Robert O'Neill	1,863	2.63	+0.98
	Margaret Perrott	1,675	2.36	+2.36
Independent	Paul Wilcock	939	1.33	+1.33
Natural Law	Fred Misdom	317	0.45	−0.28
Total formal votes		70,859	96.39	−0.27
Informal votes		2,651	3.61	+0.27
Turnout		73,510	96.53	+0.16
Two-party-preferred result
Labor	Stephen Martin	44,302	62.91	−5.00
Liberal	Philip Williams	26,122	37.09	+5.00
Labor hold		Swing	−5.00	

=== Dobell ===
This section is an excerpt from Electoral results for the Division of Dobell § 1996

1996 Australian federal election: Dobell
Party	Candidate	Votes	%	±%
Labor	Michael Lee	32,221	43.86	−9.55
Liberal	Doug Eaton	31,817	43.31	+3.17
Democrats	True Martin	5,223	7.11	+3.76
AAFI	Jeremy Pritchard	2,146	2.92	+2.92
Call to Australia	Graham Freemantle	1,304	1.78	+1.78
Independent	Aldo Katalinic	751	1.02	+1.02
Total formal votes		73,462	97.06	−0.87
Informal votes		2,224	2.94	+0.87
Turnout		75,686	96.74	−0.27
Two-party-preferred result
Labor	Michael Lee	36,675	50.08	−6.74
Liberal	Doug Eaton	36,558	49.92	+6.74
Labor hold		Swing	−6.74	

=== Eden-Monaro ===
This section is an excerpt from Electoral results for the Division of Eden-Monaro § 1996

1996 Australian federal election: Eden-Monaro
Party	Candidate	Votes	%	±%
Liberal	Gary Nairn	33,151	45.95	+7.97
Labor	Jim Snow	27,347	37.90	−9.30
Independent	Robyn Loydell	4,320	5.99	+5.99
Democrats	Nora Endean	2,592	3.59	+3.59
Greens	Robin Tennant-Wood	2,548	3.53	+3.53
AAFI	Irene Brown	1,374	1.90	+1.90
Call to Australia	David Howes	615	0.85	+0.85
Natural Law	Peter Fraser	200	0.28	−0.39
Total formal votes		72,147	97.01	−0.53
Informal votes		2,223	2.99	+0.53
Turnout		74,370	95.97	+0.33
Two-party-preferred result
Liberal	Gary Nairn	39,318	54.76	+9.03
Labor	Jim Snow	32,487	45.24	−9.03
Liberal gain from Labor		Swing	+9.03	

=== Farrer ===
This section is an excerpt from Electoral results for the Division of Farrer § 1996

1996 Australian federal election: Farrer
Party	Candidate	Votes	%	±%
National	Tim Fischer	47,231	66.34	+0.90
Labor	Lynda Summers	17,563	24.67	−5.06
Democrats	John Clancy	3,043	4.27	−0.56
Independent	Peter Whitfield	1,337	1.88	+1.88
Call to Australia	John Everingham	1,047	1.47	+1.47
Independent	Luke Downing	979	1.38	+1.38
Total formal votes		71,200	96.59	−0.63
Informal votes		2,517	3.41	+0.63
Turnout		73,717	96.02	−0.19
Two-party-preferred result
National	Tim Fischer	50,611	71.23	+3.80
Labor	Lynda Summers	20,439	28.77	−3.80
National hold		Swing	+3.80	

=== Fowler ===
This section is an excerpt from Electoral results for the Division of Fowler § 1996

1996 Australian federal election: Fowler
Party	Candidate	Votes	%	±%
Labor	Ted Grace	45,408	61.06	−7.75
Liberal	Stephen Cenatiempo	19,630	26.40	+5.48
Democrats	Mark Stevens	5,476	7.36	+7.36
AAFI	Ken Malone	3,117	4.19	+4.19
Natural Law	Lucia van Oostveen	738	0.99	−0.21
Total formal votes		74,369	91.93	−2.87
Informal votes		6,531	8.07	+2.87
Turnout		80,900	95.86	+0.90
Two-party-preferred result
Labor	Ted Grace	50,648	68.27	−3.73
Liberal	Stephen Cenatiempo	23,544	31.73	+3.73
Labor hold		Swing	−3.73	

=== Gilmore ===
This section is an excerpt from Electoral results for the Division of Gilmore § 1996

1996 Australian federal election: Gilmore
Party	Candidate	Votes	%	±%
Liberal	Joanna Gash	36,261	50.51	+8.76
Labor	Peter Knott	27,503	38.31	−4.38
Democrats	Joanne McGrath	3,449	4.80	+1.35
Greens	David Rothschild	2,039	2.84	−1.88
Independent	Tom Dell	1,195	1.66	+1.66
Call to Australia	Charles Chappell	1,117	1.56	+1.56
Natural Law	Rosemary Keighley	220	0.31	+0.08
Total formal votes		71,784	97.65	−0.18
Informal votes		1,730	2.35	+0.18
Turnout		73,514	97.07	+0.05
Two-party-preferred result
Liberal	Joanna Gash	40,243	56.24	+6.69
Labor	Peter Knott	31,317	43.76	−6.69
Liberal gain from Labor		Swing	+6.69	

=== Grayndler ===
This section is an excerpt from Electoral results for the Division of Grayndler § 1996

1996 Australian federal election: Grayndler
Party	Candidate	Votes	%	±%
Labor	Anthony Albanese	37,623	50.48	−12.57
Liberal	Morris Mansour	17,584	23.59	+0.42
No Aircraft Noise	Kevin Butler	10,142	13.61	+13.61
Democrats	David Mendelssohn	3,715	4.98	+2.20
Greens	Jenny Ryde	3,419	4.59	−1.45
Call to Australia	Alex Sharah	766	1.03	+0.16
Independent	Kate Butler	751	1.01	+1.01
Natural Law	Tom Haynes	321	0.43	−0.24
	Ron Poulsen	208	0.28	+0.28
Total formal votes		74,529	95.24	−0.86
Informal votes		4,286	5.44	+0.86
Turnout		78,815	95.24	+1.54
Two-party-preferred result
Labor	Anthony Albanese	48,910	66.38	−6.43
Liberal	Morris Mansour	24,776	33.62	+6.43
Labor hold		Swing	−6.43	

=== Greenway ===
This section is an excerpt from Electoral results for the Division of Greenway § 1996

1996 Australian federal election: Greenway
Party	Candidate	Votes	%	±%
Labor	Frank Mossfield	32,297	43.69	−15.14
Liberal	Vicki Burakowski	28,122	38.04	+5.89
Democrats	Bill Clancy	6,128	8.29	+3.69
AAFI	John Bates	3,369	4.56	+4.56
Call to Australia	Bob Bawden	2,408	3.26	+0.27
Natural Law	J.S. Ryder	1,602	2.17	+0.73
Total formal votes		73,926	94.70	−1.55
Informal votes		4,138	5.30	+1.55
Turnout		78,064	96.20	−0.08
Two-party-preferred result
Labor	Frank Mossfield	39,299	53.39	−10.03
Liberal	Vicki Burakowski	34,305	46.61	+10.03
Labor hold		Swing	−10.03	

=== Gwydir ===
This section is an excerpt from Electoral results for the Division of Gwydir § 1996

1996 Australian federal election: Gwydir
Party	Candidate	Votes	%	±%
National	John Anderson	43,385	62.32	+5.19
Labor	John Curley	19,680	28.27	−9.28
Democrats	Anne Graham	3,634	5.22	+5.22
Independent	Jim Perrett	2,914	4.19	+4.19
Total formal votes		69,613	97.46	+0.17
Informal votes		1,817	2.54	−0.17
Turnout		71,430	96.72	+0.67
Two-party-preferred result
National	John Anderson	47,552	68.51	+8.24
Labor	John Curley	21,856	31.49	−8.24
National hold		Swing	+8.24	

=== Hughes ===
This section is an excerpt from Electoral results for the Division of Hughes § 1996

1996 Australian federal election: Hughes
Party	Candidate	Votes	%	±%
Liberal	Danna Vale	38,211	48.98	+10.74
Labor	Robert Tickner	29,690	38.05	−13.79
Democrats	Robert Koppelhuber	4,534	5.81	+1.86
Greens	Steve Allen	2,517	3.23	+3.23
Call to Australia	Christopher Derrick	1,571	2.01	−0.37
Independent	Martha Halliday	1,498	1.92	+1.92
Total formal votes		78,021	97.27	−0.12
Informal votes		2,192	2.73	+0.12
Turnout		80,213	97.47	+0.29
Two-party-preferred result
Liberal	Danna Vale	42,669	54.89	+11.31
Labor	Robert Tickner	35,072	45.11	−11.31
Liberal gain from Labor		Swing	+11.31	

=== Hume ===
This section is an excerpt from Electoral results for the Division of Hume § 1996

1996 Australian federal election: Hume
Party	Candidate	Votes	%	±%
National	John Sharp	40,921	57.04	+23.44
Labor	Tony Hewson	24,943	34.77	−7.02
Democrats	Dave Cox	4,001	5.58	+3.02
Greens	Kevin Watchirs	1,876	2.61	+2.61
Total formal votes		71,741	97.40	−0.48
Informal votes		1,912	2.60	+0.48
Turnout		73,653	96.94	+0.00
Two-party-preferred result
National	John Sharp	44,174	61.77	+8.07
Labor	Tony Hewson	27,345	38.23	−8.07
National hold		Swing	+8.07	

=== Hunter ===
This section is an excerpt from Electoral results for the Division of Hunter § 1996

1996 Australian federal election: Hunter
Party	Candidate	Votes	%	±%
Labor	Joel Fitzgibbon	36,674	50.74	−9.85
National	Michael Johnsen	26,767	37.04	+19.64
Democrats	Rod Bennison	3,672	5.08	+5.08
Greens	Jenny Vaughan	3,000	4.15	+4.15
Independent	Bernard Burke	2,160	2.99	+2.99
Total formal votes		72,273	97.34	−0.30
Informal votes		1,976	2.66	+0.30
Turnout		74,249	97.05	+0.52
Two-party-preferred result
Labor	Joel Fitzgibbon	41,003	56.97	−6.95
National	Michael Johnsen	30,976	43.03	+6.95
Labor hold		Swing	−6.95	

=== Kingsford Smith ===
This section is an excerpt from Electoral results for the Division of Kingsford Smith § 1996

1996 Australian federal election: Kingsford-Smith
Party	Candidate	Votes	%	±%
Labor	Laurie Brereton	37,098	51.58	−7.58
Liberal	John Xenos	25,190	35.02	+3.25
Democrats	Christopher Brieger	5,523	7.68	+4.09
Greens	Jeremy Oxley	3,103	4.31	+0.21
Natural Law	Suzi Haynes	484	0.67	+0.10
	Ted Marshall	278	0.39	+0.39
	Yabu Bilyana	254	0.35	+0.35
Total formal votes		71,930	94.95	−0.70
Informal votes		3,825	5.05	+0.70
Turnout		75,755	95.00	+0.07
Two-party-preferred result
Labor	Laurie Brereton	43,028	60.15	−5.09
Liberal	John Xenos	28,511	39.85	+5.09
Labor hold		Swing	−5.09	

=== Lindsay ===
This section is an excerpt from Electoral results for the Division of Lindsay § 1996

1996 Australian federal election: Lindsay
Party	Candidate	Votes	%	±%
Liberal	Jackie Kelly	31,811	42.52	+5.91
Labor	Ross Free	30,168	40.32	−18.23
Democrats	John Wilson	4,929	6.59	+6.59
Greens	Lesley Edwards	3,299	4.41	+4.41
AAFI	Terry Cooksley	2,041	2.73	+2.73
Call to Australia	Brian Grigg	1,614	2.16	−2.68
Independent	Stephen Davidson	956	1.28	+1.28
Total formal votes		74,818	96.42	−0.45
Informal votes		2,778	3.58	+0.45
Turnout		77,596	96.12	−0.52
Two-party-preferred result
Liberal	Jackie Kelly	38,442	51.58	+11.80
Labor	Ross Free	36,088	48.42	−11.80
Liberal gain from Labor		Swing	+11.80	

=== Lowe ===
This section is an excerpt from Electoral results for the Division of Lowe § 1996

1996 Australian federal election: Lowe
Party	Candidate	Votes	%	±%
Liberal	Paul Zammit	33,966	46.68	+5.12
Labor	Mary Easson	28,447	39.10	−8.41
Democrats	Noel Plumb	3,143	4.32	+2.81
Independent	Peter Woods	2,279	3.13	+0.72
No Aircraft Noise	Michelle Calvert	2,137	2.94	+2.94
Greens	Doug Hine	1,367	1.88	+1.88
Call to Australia	Katie Wood	782	1.07	+0.40
Independent	Dave Allen	271	0.37	+0.37
Natural Law	Bob Hughes	204	0.28	+0.07
	Max Lane	167	0.23	+0.23
Total formal votes		72,763	94.77	−0.85
Informal votes		4,016	5.23	+0.85
Turnout		76,779	96.46	+0.64
Two-party-preferred result
Liberal	Paul Zammit	37,978	52.47	+7.48
Labor	Mary Easson	34,405	47.53	−7.48
Liberal gain from Labor		Swing	+7.48	

=== Lyne ===
This section is an excerpt from Electoral results for the Division of Lyne § 1996

1996 Australian federal election: Lyne
Party	Candidate	Votes	%	±%
National	Mark Vaile	44,056	58.85	+32.16
Labor	John Weate	21,717	29.01	−11.62
Democrats	Rodger Riach	3,379	4.51	+1.73
AAFI	Marje Roswell	3,237	4.32	+4.32
Greens	Susie Russell	2,478	3.31	+3.31
Total formal votes		74,867	97.49	−0.44
Informal votes		1,927	2.51	+0.44
Turnout		76,794	96.82	+0.33
Two-party-preferred result
National	Mark Vaile	48,801	65.44	+11.20
Labor	John Weate	25,776	34.56	−11.20
National hold		Swing	+11.20	

=== Macarthur ===
This section is an excerpt from Electoral results for the Division of Macarthur § 1996

1996 Australian federal election: Macarthur
Party	Candidate	Votes	%	±%
Liberal	John Fahey	40,963	53.38	+8.82
Labor	Noel Lowry	24,570	32.02	−14.50
Democrats	Peter Fraser	3,714	4.84	+4.84
Independent	Herb Bethune	2,563	3.34	−1.98
Greens	Vicki Kearney	2,132	2.78	+2.78
AAFI	Janet Watkins	2,090	2.72	+2.72
Independent	Colleen Street	435	0.57	+0.57
Independent	Stephen Agius	275	0.36	+0.36
Total formal votes		76,742	96.48	−0.64
Informal votes		2,799	3.52	+0.64
Turnout		79,541	96.73	+0.60
Two-party-preferred result
Liberal	John Fahey	46,372	60.69	+11.97
Labor	Noel Lowry	30,034	39.31	−11.97
Liberal gain from Labor		Swing	+11.97	

=== Mackellar ===
This section is an excerpt from Electoral results for the Division of Mackellar § 1996

1996 Australian federal election: Mackellar
Party	Candidate	Votes	%	±%
Liberal	Bronwyn Bishop	40,886	54.66	−1.95
Labor	Ross McLoughlin	14,590	19.51	−13.73
Democrats	Vicki Dimond	8,188	10.95	+3.87
Greens	Chris Cairns	3,236	4.33	+4.33
AAFI	John Bridge	2,909	3.89	+3.89
Independent	Anne Ellis	2,848	3.81	+3.81
Call to Australia	Rick Bristow	1,369	1.83	+0.10
Reclaim Australia	Rodney Smith	631	0.84	+0.84
Natural Law	Stephen Doric	144	0.19	−1.16
Total formal votes		74,801	96.71	−0.29
Informal votes		2,547	3.29	+0.29
Turnout		77,348	96.47	+0.69
Two-party-preferred result
Liberal	Bronwyn Bishop	49,341	66.53	+5.37
Labor	Ross McLoughlin	24,827	33.47	−5.37
Liberal hold		Swing	+5.37	

=== Macquarie ===
This section is an excerpt from Electoral results for the Division of Macquarie § 1996

1996 Australian federal election: Macquarie
Party	Candidate	Votes	%	±%
Liberal	Kerry Bartlett	35,199	48.09	+3.73
Labor	Maggie Deahm	24,614	33.63	−8.85
Democrats	Jon Rickard	6,127	8.37	+1.72
Greens	Carol Gaul	2,782	3.80	+0.01
AAFI	Warwick Tyler	1,806	2.47	+2.47
Call to Australia	Heather Kraus	1,753	2.40	+2.40
Independent	John McCall	906	1.24	+1.24
Total formal votes		73,187	96.06	−1.44
Informal votes		3,004	3.94	+1.44
Turnout		76,191	96.58	+0.53
Two-party-preferred result
Liberal	Kerry Bartlett	41,045	56.36	+6.48
Labor	Maggie Deahm	31,780	43.64	−6.48
Liberal gain from Labor		Swing	+6.48	

=== Mitchell ===
This section is an excerpt from Electoral results for the Division of Mitchell § 1996

1996 Australian federal election: Mitchell
Party	Candidate	Votes	%	±%
Liberal	Alan Cadman	48,541	67.43	+2.54
Labor	Erica Lewis	13,790	19.16	−9.03
Democrats	Colleen Krason	5,930	8.24	+2.81
AAFI	Tony Pettitt	2,688	3.73	+3.73
Reclaim Australia	John Hutchinson	699	0.97	+0.97
Natural Law	Penny Price	338	0.47	+0.47
Total formal votes		71,986	97.02	−0.67
Informal votes		2,214	2.98	+0.67
Turnout		74,200	97.13	+0.29
Two-party-preferred result
Liberal	Alan Cadman	53,293	74.32	+5.66
Labor	Erica Lewis	18,410	25.68	−5.66
Liberal hold		Swing	+5.66	

=== New England ===
This section is an excerpt from Electoral results for the Division of New England § 1996

1996 Australian federal election: New England
Party	Candidate	Votes	%	±%
National	Ian Sinclair	42,539	60.50	+7.80
Labor	Herman Beyersdorf	17,477	24.86	−9.35
Democrats	Allan Caswell	6,221	8.85	+8.85
Independent	Terry Larsen	3,333	4.74	+4.74
Natural Law	Frances Letters	743	1.06	+1.06
Total formal votes		70,313	97.71	−0.17
Informal votes		1,649	2.29	+0.17
Turnout		71,962	96.08	−0.54
Two-party-preferred result
National	Ian Sinclair	48,381	69.18	+8.98
Labor	Herman Beyersdorf	21,551	30.82	−8.98
National hold		Swing	+8.98	

=== Newcastle ===
This section is an excerpt from Electoral results for the Division of Newcastle § 1996

1996 Australian federal election: Newcastle
Party	Candidate	Votes	%	±%
Labor	Allan Morris	36,146	50.14	−6.53
Liberal	Ivan Welsh	21,938	30.43	+2.93
Democrats	Barry Boettcher	7,126	9.89	+6.99
Greens	Cathy Burgess	6,288	8.72	+1.38
	Kamala Emanuel	591	0.82	+0.82
Total formal votes		72,089	97.16	+0.11
Informal votes		2,105	2.84	−0.11
Turnout		74,194	96.77	+0.31
Two-party-preferred result
Labor	Allan Morris	43,807	61.19	−5.69
Liberal	Ivan Welsh	27,780	38.81	+5.69
Labor hold		Swing	−5.69	

=== North Sydney ===
This section is an excerpt from Electoral results for the Division of North Sydney § 1996

1996 Australian federal election: North Sydney
Party	Candidate	Votes	%	±%
Liberal	Joe Hockey	45,634	57.29	+11.35
Labor	Julie Owens	20,132	25.27	+8.28
Democrats	Linda Wade	7,947	9.98	+9.98
Greens	George Carter	3,039	3.81	+3.81
Independent	Richard Tanner	2,908	3.65	+3.65
Total formal votes		79,660	97.45	−0.51
Informal votes		2,081	2.55	+0.51
Turnout		81,741	95.14	+0.57
Two-party-preferred result
Liberal	Joe Hockey	51,851	65.56	+6.6
Labor	Julie Owens	27,244	34.44	−6.6
Liberal gain from Independent		Swing	+6.6	

The sitting member Ted Mack (Independent) did not contest the election.

=== Page ===
This section is an excerpt from Electoral results for the Division of Page § 1996

1996 Australian federal election: Page
Party	Candidate	Votes	%	±%
Labor	Harry Woods	28,972	38.04	−3.79
National	Ian Causley	27,927	36.66	+7.84
Liberal	Anne Hunter	12,132	15.93	−1.38
Greens	Sue Higginson	2,971	3.90	+3.90
Democrats	James Page	2,514	3.30	+1.96
Call to Australia	Trevor Arthur	1,119	1.47	+1.47
Greens	Al Oshlack	535	0.70	−1.70
Total formal votes		76,170	98.05	+0.11
Informal votes		1,513	1.95	−0.11
Turnout		77,683	96.59	+0.31
Two-party-preferred result
National	Ian Causley	41,190	54.31	+4.44
Labor	Harry Woods	34,657	45.69	−4.44
National gain from Labor		Swing	+4.44	

=== Parkes ===
This section is an excerpt from Electoral results for the Division of Parkes § 1996

1996 Australian federal election: Parkes
Party	Candidate	Votes	%	±%
National	Michael Cobb	38,264	51.21	+3.71
Labor	Barry Brebner	28,530	38.18	−7.33
Democrats	Ken Graham	1,965	2.63	−0.48
Independent	Edna Cook	1,758	2.35	+2.35
Women's Party	Dianne Decker	1,708	2.29	+2.29
AAFI	Vivian Desmond	1,528	2.08	+2.05
Natural Law	David McLennan	964	1.29	+0.33
Total formal votes		74,717	97.12	−0.41
Informal votes		2,218	2.88	+0.41
Turnout		76,935	95.86	+0.30
Two-party-preferred result
National	Michael Cobb	42,100	56.50	+5.96
Labor	Barry Brebner	32,418	43.50	−5.96
National hold		Swing	+5.96	

=== Parramatta ===
This section is an excerpt from Electoral results for the Division of Parramatta § 1996

1996 Australian federal election: Parramatta
Party	Candidate	Votes	%	±%
Liberal	Ross Cameron	34,310	47.65	+5.45
Labor	Paul Elliott	28,390	39.43	−9.81
Democrats	Eduardo Avila	3,912	5.43	+2.13
AAFI	Peter Krumins	2,005	2.78	+2.78
Independent	Heidi Scott	1,103	1.53	+1.53
Call to Australia	Dee Jonsson	1,066	1.48	+0.04
Natural Law	John Cogger	755	1.08	+0.48
Independent	Joseph Chidiac	440	0.61	+0.61
Total formal votes		72,001	96.14	−0.95
Informal votes		2,887	3.86	+0.95
Turnout		74,888	96.39	+0.32
Two-party-preferred result
Liberal	Ross Cameron	38,671	53.87	+7.11
Labor	Paul Elliott	33,115	46.13	−7.11
Liberal gain from Labor		Swing	+7.11	

=== Paterson ===
This section is an excerpt from Electoral results for the Division of Paterson § 1996

1996 Australian federal election: Paterson
Party	Candidate	Votes	%	±%
Liberal	Bob Baldwin	34,113	45.67	+10.40
Labor	Bob Horne	32,378	43.35	−4.16
Democrats	Bob Symington	3,727	4.99	+2.98
Greens	Jan Davis	2,647	3.54	+0.69
Call to Australia	Trevor Carrick	1,829	2.45	+2.45
Total formal votes		74,694	97.74	+0.11
Informal votes		1,730	2.26	−0.11
Turnout		76,424	97.36	+0.36
Two-party-preferred result
Liberal	Bob Baldwin	37,519	50.43	+3.73
Labor	Bob Horne	36,885	49.57	−3.73
Liberal gain from Labor		Swing	+3.73	

=== Prospect ===
This section is an excerpt from Electoral results for the Division of Prospect § 1996

1996 Australian federal election: Prospect
Party	Candidate	Votes	%	±%
Labor	Janice Crosio	39,318	56.68	−8.69
Liberal	Ron Cameron	22,182	31.97	+5.86
Democrats	Manny Poularas	6,951	10.02	+5.50
Natural Law	Linda Cogger	922	1.33	+0.74
Total formal votes		69,373	94.23	−0.15
Informal votes		4,248	5.77	+0.15
Turnout		73,621	96.28	+0.14
Two-party-preferred result
Labor	Janice Crosio	44,236	63.91	−5.13
Liberal	Ron Cameron	24,984	36.09	+5.13
Labor hold		Swing	−5.13	

=== Reid ===
This section is an excerpt from Electoral results for the Division of Reid § 1996

1996 Australian federal election: Reid
Party	Candidate	Votes	%	±%
Labor	Laurie Ferguson	40,910	57.15	−7.55
Liberal	Lynne McDowell	24,720	34.53	+6.63
Democrats	Alfie Giuliano	4,977	6.95	+6.95
Natural Law	Catherine Doric	975	1.36	+0.43
Total formal votes		71,582	94.65	−0.48
Informal votes		4,047	5.35	+0.48
Turnout		75,629	96.31	+0.77
Two-party-preferred result
Labor	Laurie Ferguson	43,837	61.38	−7.42
Liberal	Lynne McDowell	27,580	38.62	+7.42
Labor hold		Swing	−7.42	

=== Richmond ===
This section is an excerpt from Electoral results for the Division of Richmond § 1996

1996 Australian federal election: Richmond
Party	Candidate	Votes	%	±%
National	Larry Anthony	27,262	35.43	+9.70
Labor	Neville Newell	26,653	34.64	−9.57
Liberal	Keith Johnson	14,180	18.43	−2.68
Democrats	Mindy Thorpe	4,171	5.42	+3.19
Greens	Annette Coyle	4,043	5.25	+0.65
Greens	Robert Corowa	638	0.83	+0.83
Total formal votes		76,947	97.91	+0.98
Informal votes		1,640	2.09	−0.98
Turnout		78,587	96.01	+0.37
Two-party-preferred result
National	Larry Anthony	43,448	56.75	+8.53
Labor	Neville Newell	33,108	43.25	−8.53
National gain from Labor		Swing	+8.53	

=== Riverina ===
This section is an excerpt from Electoral results for the Division of Riverina § 1996

1996 Australian federal election: Riverina
Party	Candidate	Votes	%	±%
National	Noel Hicks	48,994	65.97	+27.51
Labor	Rob Colligan	19,454	26.20	−7.40
Democrats	John Collins	2,977	4.01	+4.01
Independent	Alistair Jones	2,837	3.82	+3.82
Total formal votes		74,262	96.77	−0.89
Informal votes		2,476	3.23	+0.89
Turnout		76,738	97.02	+0.89
Two-party-preferred result
National	Noel Hicks	52,614	71.01	+8.08
Labor	Rob Colligan	21,484	28.99	−8.08
National hold		Swing	+8.08	

=== Robertson ===
This section is an excerpt from Electoral results for the Division of Robertson § 1996

1996 Australian federal election: Robertson
Party	Candidate	Votes	%	±%
Liberal	Jim Lloyd	33,825	46.79	+5.49
Labor	Frank Walker	28,412	39.30	−10.85
Democrats	Andrew Penfold	5,271	7.29	+2.45
AAFI	Roy Whaite	2,472	3.42	+3.42
Greens	Bryan Ellis	1,887	2.61	−0.64
Independent	Valiant Leung	422	0.58	+0.58
Total formal votes		72,289	97.18	−0.58
Informal votes		2,095	2.82	+0.58
Turnout		74,384	97.08	+0.82
Two-party-preferred result
Liberal	Jim Lloyd	38,563	53.56	+9.12
Labor	Frank Walker	33,430	46.44	−9.12
Liberal gain from Labor		Swing	+9.12	

=== Shortland ===
This section is an excerpt from Electoral results for the Division of Shortland § 1996

1996 Australian federal election: Shortland
Party	Candidate	Votes	%	±%
Labor	Peter Morris	36,603	50.88	−10.96
Liberal	David Parker	24,812	34.49	+5.62
Democrats	Kaye Westbury	4,977	6.92	+1.36
Greens	Ian McKenzie	3,102	4.31	+4.31
Independent	Richard Hill	1,898	2.64	+2.65
	Terry Cook	547	0.76	−0.30
Total formal votes		71,939	97.20	−0.25
Informal votes		2,075	2.80	+0.25
Turnout		74,014	97.27	+0.66
Two-party-preferred result
Labor	Peter Morris	41,660	58.15	−9.18
Liberal	David Parker	29,982	41.85	+9.18
Labor hold		Swing	−9.18	

=== Sydney ===
This section is an excerpt from Electoral results for the Division of Sydney § 1996

1996 Australian federal election: Sydney
Party	Candidate	Votes	%	±%
Labor	Peter Baldwin	35,788	48.38	−10.10
Liberal	Peter Fussell	20,430	27.62	+1.63
Democrats	Paul Nederlof	6,471	8.75	+4.81
No Aircraft Noise	Wendy Bacon	5,042	6.82	+6.82
Greens	Sue Stock	4,285	5.79	−1.95
	Karen Fletcher	584	0.79	+0.79
Independent	Peter Bushby	537	0.73	+0.73
Call to Australia	Janne Peterson	483	0.65	+0.65
Natural Law	Michael Lippmann	242	0.33	−0.57
	Donald O'Halloran	112	0.15	−0.11
Total formal votes		73,974	95.48	−1.28
Informal votes		3,502	4.52	+1.28
Turnout		77,476	92.85	+0.40
Two-party-preferred result
Labor	Peter Baldwin	46,703	63.80	−5.67
Liberal	Peter Fussell	26,495	36.20	+5.67
Labor hold		Swing	−5.67	

=== Throsby ===
This section is an excerpt from Electoral results for the Division of Throsby § 1996

1996 Australian federal election: Throsby
Party	Candidate	Votes	%	±%
Labor	Colin Hollis	42,963	60.83	+2.40
Liberal	Albert Galea	15,326	21.70	+4.83
Democrats	Elizabeth Fisher	5,990	8.48	+5.16
Greens	Les Robinson	3,629	5.14	+0.94
Call to Australia	Brian Hughes	2,716	3.85	+1.69
Total formal votes		70,624	96.12	+0.34
Informal votes		2,848	3.88	−0.34
Turnout		73,472	97.10	+0.58
Two-party-preferred result
Labor	Colin Hollis	48,966	69.62	−4.41
Liberal	Albert Galea	21,369	30.38	+4.41
Labor hold		Swing	−4.41	

=== Warringah ===
This section is an excerpt from Electoral results for the Division of Warringah § 1996

1996 Australian federal election: Warringah
Party	Candidate	Votes	%	±%
Liberal	Tony Abbott	42,217	57.72	+1.61
Labor	Julie Heraghty	19,488	26.64	−7.16
Democrats	Wallace Logue	4,919	6.72	+2.46
Greens	Karen Picken	3,551	4.85	+4.85
AAFI	Ian Weatherlake	2,701	3.69	+3.69
Natural Law	Beth Eager	271	0.37	−1.69
Total formal votes		73,147	97.11	−0.51
Informal votes		2,178	2.89	+0.51
Turnout		75,325	96.11	+0.64
Two-party-preferred result
Liberal	Tony Abbott	47,476	65.32	+5.06
Labor	Julie Heraghty	25,208	34.68	−5.06
Liberal hold		Swing	+5.06	

=== Watson ===
This section is an excerpt from Electoral results for the Division of Watson § 1996

1996 Australian federal election: Watson
Party	Candidate	Votes	%	±%
Labor	Leo McLeay	39,329	55.11	−4.45
Liberal	Bruce Larter	23,840	33.41	+2.94
Democrats	Amelia Newman	5,625	7.88	+4.37
Call to Australia	Todd Rahme	2,570	3.60	+3.60
Total formal votes		71,364	94.88	−0.06
Informal votes		3,851	5.12	+0.06
Turnout		75,215	96.05	+0.58
Two-party-preferred result
Labor	Leo McLeay	43,913	61.68	−3.16
Liberal	Bruce Larter	27,281	38.32	+3.16
Labor hold		Swing	−3.16	

=== Wentworth ===
This section is an excerpt from Electoral results for the Division of Wentworth § 1996

1996 Australian federal election: Wentworth
Party	Candidate	Votes	%	±%
Liberal	Andrew Thomson	39,014	52.01	−0.66
Labor	Paul Pearce	23,856	31.80	−5.01
Democrats	Di Happ	6,506	8.67	+5.89
Greens	Fiona McCrossin	4,468	5.96	+5.96
Independent	Rodney Marks	468	0.62	+0.62
Independent	David Synnott	358	0.48	+0.48
Natural Law	Paddy Engelen	225	0.30	+0.30
	John Hooper	122	0.16	+0.16
Total formal votes		75,017	96.55	−0.55
Informal votes		2,684	3.45	+0.55
Turnout		77,701	95.41	+0.86
Two-party-preferred result
Liberal	Andrew Thomson	43,122	57.83	+2.37
Labor	Paul Pearce	31,445	42.17	−2.37
Liberal hold		Swing	+2.37	

=== Werriwa ===
This section is an excerpt from Electoral results for the Division of Werriwa § 1996

1996 Australian federal election: Werriwa
Party	Candidate	Votes	%	±%
Labor	Mark Latham	33,800	47.90	−13.51
Liberal	Andrew Thorn	23,790	33.71	+3.22
Democrats	Emanuela Lang	4,541	6.44	+1.47
AAFI	Vince Townsend	3,973	5.63	+5.63
Independent	James Whitehall	2,722	3.86	+3.86
Reclaim Australia	Edwin Woodger	1,169	1.66	+1.66
	Greg Josling	571	0.81	+0.81
Total formal votes		70,566	94.91	−1.09
Informal votes		3,782	5.09	+1.09
Turnout		74,348	95.82	+0.52
Two-party-preferred result
Labor	Mark Latham	39,489	56.21	−9.56
Liberal	Andrew Thorn	30,761	43.79	+9.56
Labor hold		Swing	−9.56	

== See also ==
- Results of the 1996 Australian federal election (House of Representatives)
- Members of the Australian House of Representatives, 1996–1998
