= Electoral results for the Division of Gilmore =

Australian division election results

This is a list of electoral results for the Division of Gilmore in Australian federal elections from the electorate's creation in 1984 until the present.

== Members ==
| Member | Party | Term |
|---|---|---|
| John Sharp | National | 1984–1993 |
| Peter Knott | Labor | 1993–1996 |
| Joanna Gash | Liberal | 1996–2013 |
| Ann Sudmalis | Liberal | 2013–2019 |
| Fiona Phillips | Labor | 2019–present |

== Election results ==
=== Elections in the 2020s ===
==== 2025 ====
2025 Australian federal election: Gilmore
| Party | Candidate | Votes | % | ±% |
|---|---|---|---|---|
| Labor | Fiona Phillips | | | |
| Independent | Kate Dezarnaulds | | | |
| Trumpet of Patriots | Melissa Wise | | | |
| Greens | Debbie Killian | | | |
| Family First | Graham Brown | | | |
| Liberal | Andrew Constance | | | |
| One Nation | John Hawke | | | |
| Legalise Cannabis | Adrian Richard Carle | | | |
| Total formal votes | | | | |
| Informal votes | | | | |
| Turnout | | | | |

==== 2022 ====
2022 Australian federal election: Gilmore
| Party | Candidate | Votes | % | ±% |
|---|---|---|---|---|
| Liberal | Andrew Constance | 46,941 | 42.02 | +12.83 |
| Labor | Fiona Phillips | 40,175 | 35.97 | −0.22 |
| Greens | Carmel McCallum | 11,417 | 10.22 | +0.25 |
| Independent | Nina Digiglio | 4,721 | 4.23 | +4.23 |
| One Nation | Jerremy Eid | 4,453 | 3.99 | +3.99 |
| United Australia | Jordan Maloney | 3,108 | 2.78 | −0.60 |
| Liberal Democrats | Adrian Fadini | 890 | 0.80 | +0.80 |
| Total formal votes | | 111,705 | 95.58 | +0.83 |
| Informal votes | | 5,170 | 4.42 | −0.83 |
| Turnout | | 116,875 | 91.59 | −1.29 |
Two-party-preferred result
| Labor | Fiona Phillips | 56,039 | 50.17 | −2.44 |
| Liberal | Andrew Constance | 55,666 | 49.83 | +2.44 |
| Labor hold | | Swing | −2.44 | |

Alluvial diagram for preference flows in the seat of Gilmore in the 2022 federal election. indicates at what stage the winning candidate had over 50% of the votes and was declared the winner.

=== Elections in the 2010s ===
==== 2019 ====
2019 Australian federal election: Gilmore
| Party | Candidate | Votes | % | ±% |
|---|---|---|---|---|
| Labor | Fiona Phillips | 38,972 | 36.19 | −3.04 |
| Liberal | Warren Mundine | 31,427 | 29.19 | −16.09 |
| National | Katrina Hodgkinson | 13,462 | 12.50 | +12.50 |
| Greens | Carmel McCallum | 10,740 | 9.97 | −0.52 |
| Independent | Grant Schultz | 7,585 | 7.04 | +7.04 |
| United Australia | Milton Leslight | 3,638 | 3.38 | +3.38 |
| Christian Democrats | Serah Kolukulapally | 1,853 | 1.72 | −3.28 |
| Total formal votes | | 107,677 | 94.75 | −1.12 |
| Informal votes | | 5,970 | 5.25 | +1.12 |
| Turnout | | 113,647 | 92.88 | +0.01 |
Two-party-preferred result
| Labor | Fiona Phillips | 56,652 | 52.61 | +3.34 |
| Liberal | Warren Mundine | 51,025 | 47.39 | −3.34 |
| Labor gain from Liberal | | Swing | +3.34 | |

==== 2016 ====
2016 Australian federal election: Gilmore
| Party | Candidate | Votes | % | ±% |
|---|---|---|---|---|
| Liberal | Ann Sudmalis | 46,713 | 45.28 | −2.15 |
| Labor | Fiona Phillips | 40,476 | 39.23 | +4.97 |
| Greens | Carmel McCallum | 10,820 | 10.49 | +1.43 |
| Christian Democrats | Steve Ryan | 5,160 | 5.00 | +2.16 |
| Total formal votes | | 103,169 | 95.87 | +1.08 |
| Informal votes | | 4,442 | 4.13 | −1.08 |
| Turnout | | 107,611 | 92.87 | −0.27 |
Two-party-preferred result
| Liberal | Ann Sudmalis | 52,336 | 50.73 | −3.05 |
| Labor | Fiona Phillips | 50,833 | 49.27 | +3.05 |
| Liberal hold | | Swing | −3.05 | |

==== 2013 ====
2013 Australian federal election: Gilmore
| Party | Candidate | Votes | % | ±% |
|---|---|---|---|---|
| Liberal | Ann Sudmalis | 41,726 | 46.00 | −4.93 |
| Labor | Neil Reilly | 31,789 | 35.05 | −0.13 |
| Greens | Terry Barratt | 8,438 | 9.30 | −0.27 |
| Palmer United | Lyndal Harris | 5,726 | 6.31 | +6.31 |
| Christian Democrats | Steve Ryan | 3,030 | 3.34 | +0.67 |
| Total formal votes | | 90,709 | 94.83 | −0.06 |
| Informal votes | | 4,946 | 5.17 | +0.06 |
| Turnout | | 95,655 | 94.29 | −0.33 |
Two-party-preferred result
| Liberal | Ann Sudmalis | 47,758 | 52.65 | −2.67 |
| Labor | Neil Reilly | 42,951 | 47.35 | +2.67 |
| Liberal hold | | Swing | −2.67 | |

==== 2010 ====
2010 Australian federal election: Gilmore
| Party | Candidate | Votes | % | ±% |
|---|---|---|---|---|
| Liberal | Joanna Gash | 44,050 | 50.93 | +5.15 |
| Labor | Neil Reilly | 30,430 | 35.18 | −6.83 |
| Greens | Ben van der Wijngaart | 8,279 | 9.57 | +1.49 |
| Christian Democrats | Bohdan Brumerskyj | 2,310 | 2.67 | +0.18 |
| Family First | Elizabeth Cunningham | 781 | 0.90 | +0.50 |
| Liberal Democrats | Don Keys | 374 | 0.43 | +0.28 |
| Secular | Annette Williams | 275 | 0.32 | +0.32 |
| Total formal votes | | 86,499 | 94.89 | −0.87 |
| Informal votes | | 4,658 | 5.11 | +0.87 |
| Turnout | | 91,157 | 94.64 | −1.17 |
Two-party-preferred result
| Liberal | Joanna Gash | 47,850 | 55.32 | +5.73 |
| Labor | Neil Reilly | 38,649 | 44.68 | −5.73 |
| Liberal notional gain from Labor | | Swing | +5.73 | |

=== Elections in the 2000s ===
==== 2007 ====
2007 Australian federal election: Gilmore
| Party | Candidate | Votes | % | ±% |
|---|---|---|---|---|
| Liberal | Joanna Gash | 40,513 | 50.39 | −3.83 |
| Labor | Neil Reilly | 30,386 | 37.79 | +5.71 |
| Greens | Ben van der Wijngaart | 6,070 | 7.55 | +0.32 |
| Christian Democrats | Bohdan Brumerskyj | 1,755 | 2.18 | −1.71 |
| Independent | Of The Above None | 686 | 0.85 | +0.85 |
| Family First | Brett Greenhalgh | 407 | 0.51 | +0.51 |
| Climate Conservatives | Simon Blake | 370 | 0.46 | +0.46 |
| Liberty & Democracy | Kevin Ramsey | 151 | 0.19 | +0.19 |
| Citizens Electoral Council | Warwick Hunt | 59 | 0.07 | −0.09 |
| Total formal votes | | 80,397 | 95.79 | +0.24 |
| Informal votes | | 3,536 | 4.21 | −0.24 |
| Turnout | | 83,933 | 95.88 | +0.61 |
Two-party-preferred result
| Liberal | Joanna Gash | 43,467 | 54.07 | −5.34 |
| Labor | Neil Reilly | 36,930 | 45.93 | +5.34 |
| Liberal hold | | Swing | −5.34 | |

==== 2004 ====
2004 Australian federal election: Gilmore
| Party | Candidate | Votes | % | ±% |
|---|---|---|---|---|
| Liberal | Joanna Gash | 43,723 | 54.58 | −1.53 |
| Labor | Megan Pikett | 24,835 | 31.00 | +4.95 |
| Greens | Ben van der Wijngaart | 6,234 | 7.78 | +2.29 |
| Christian Democrats | Paul Green | 3,381 | 4.22 | +2.59 |
| One Nation | Col Harding | 1,762 | 2.20 | −3.60 |
| Citizens Electoral Council | Jean McClung | 176 | 0.22 | +0.07 |
| Total formal votes | | 80,111 | 95.77 | +0.11 |
| Informal votes | | 3,542 | 4.23 | −0.11 |
| Turnout | | 83,653 | 95.47 | −0.21 |
Two-party-preferred result
| Liberal | Joanna Gash | 48,130 | 60.08 | −4.55 |
| Labor | Megan Pikett | 31,981 | 39.92 | +4.55 |
| Liberal hold | | Swing | −4.55 | |

==== 2001 ====
2001 Australian federal election: Gilmore
| Party | Candidate | Votes | % | ±% |
|---|---|---|---|---|
| Liberal | Joanna Gash | 43,089 | 56.11 | +10.97 |
| Labor | Peter Knott | 20,011 | 26.06 | −9.78 |
| One Nation | Geoff Crocker | 4,454 | 5.80 | −5.24 |
| Greens | Jane Bange | 4,218 | 5.49 | +2.78 |
| Democrats | Michael Hayes | 3,323 | 4.33 | +1.04 |
| Christian Democrats | Steve Ryan | 1,253 | 1.63 | −0.36 |
| Unity | Paul McLeod | 339 | 0.44 | +0.44 |
| Citizens Electoral Council | Jean McClung | 113 | 0.15 | +0.15 |
| Total formal votes | | 76,800 | 95.66 | −2.05 |
| Informal votes | | 3,485 | 4.34 | +2.05 |
| Turnout | | 80,285 | 96.49 | |
Two-party-preferred result
| Liberal | Joanna Gash | 49,634 | 64.63 | +10.08 |
| Labor | Peter Knott | 27,166 | 35.37 | −10.08 |
| Liberal hold | | Swing | +10.08 | |

=== Elections in the 1990s ===
==== 1998 ====
1998 Australian federal election: Gilmore
| Party | Candidate | Votes | % | ±% |
|---|---|---|---|---|
| Liberal | Joanna Gash | 33,390 | 45.09 | −5.42 |
| Labor | Sandra McCarthy | 26,509 | 35.80 | −2.51 |
| One Nation | Tom Dell | 8,206 | 11.08 | +11.08 |
| Democrats | Peter Fraser | 2,444 | 3.30 | −1.50 |
| Greens | Jane Bange | 2,020 | 2.73 | −0.11 |
| Christian Democrats | Steve Ryan | 1,481 | 2.00 | +0.44 |
| Total formal votes | | 74,050 | 97.70 | +0.05 |
| Informal votes | | 1,743 | 2.30 | −0.05 |
| Turnout | | 75,793 | 96.21 | −0.86 |
Two-party-preferred result
| Liberal | Joanna Gash | 40,013 | 54.04 | −2.20 |
| Labor | Sandra McCarthy | 34,037 | 45.96 | +2.20 |
| Liberal hold | | Swing | −2.20 | |

==== 1996 ====
1996 Australian federal election: Gilmore
| Party | Candidate | Votes | % | ±% |
|---|---|---|---|---|
| Liberal | Joanna Gash | 36,261 | 50.51 | +8.76 |
| Labor | Peter Knott | 27,503 | 38.31 | −4.38 |
| Democrats | Joanne McGrath | 3,449 | 4.80 | +1.35 |
| Greens | David Rothschild | 2,039 | 2.84 | −1.88 |
| Independent | Tom Dell | 1,195 | 1.66 | +1.66 |
| Call to Australia | Charles Chappell | 1,117 | 1.56 | +1.56 |
| Natural Law | Rosemary Keighley | 220 | 0.31 | +0.08 |
| Total formal votes | | 71,784 | 97.65 | −0.18 |
| Informal votes | | 1,730 | 2.35 | +0.18 |
| Turnout | | 73,514 | 97.07 | +0.05 |
Two-party-preferred result
| Liberal | Joanna Gash | 40,243 | 56.24 | +6.69 |
| Labor | Peter Knott | 31,317 | 43.76 | −6.69 |
| Liberal gain from Labor | | Swing | +6.69 | |

==== 1993 ====
1993 Australian federal election: Gilmore
| Party | Candidate | Votes | % | ±% |
|---|---|---|---|---|
| Labor | Peter Knott | 28,559 | 42.69 | +3.13 |
| Liberal | Bill Eddy | 27,932 | 41.76 | +23.53 |
| National | Max Atkins | 3,380 | 5.05 | −19.97 |
| Greens | May Leatch | 3,160 | 4.72 | +4.10 |
| Democrats | Greg Butler | 2,312 | 3.46 | −9.65 |
| Independent | Jeff Stanborough | 925 | 1.38 | +1.38 |
| Independent | Ruth Devenney | 475 | 0.71 | +0.71 |
| Natural Law | Rosemary Keighley | 151 | 0.23 | +0.23 |
| Total formal votes | | 66,894 | 97.83 | +0.02 |
| Informal votes | | 1,483 | 2.17 | −0.02 |
| Turnout | | 68,377 | 97.02 | |
Two-party-preferred result
| Labor | Peter Knott | 33,721 | 50.45 | +1.24 |
| Liberal | Bill Eddy | 33,115 | 49.55 | −1.24 |
| Labor gain from National | | Swing | +1.24 | |

==== 1990 ====
1990 Australian federal election: Gilmore
| Party | Candidate | Votes | % | ±% |
|---|---|---|---|---|
| National | John Sharp | 32,819 | 48.7 | −3.6 |
| Labor | Mick Shea | 26,677 | 39.6 | −1.3 |
| Democrats | Susan Nagy | 7,935 | 11.8 | +7.2 |
| Total formal votes | | 67,431 | 97.5 | |
| Informal votes | | 1,745 | 2.5 | |
| Turnout | | 69,176 | 95.8 | |
Two-party-preferred result
| National | John Sharp | 36,655 | 54.4 | −1.8 |
| Labor | Mick Shea | 30,725 | 45.6 | +1.8 |
| National hold | | Swing | −1.8 | |

=== Elections in the 1980s ===
==== 1987 ====
1987 Australian federal election: Gilmore
| Party | Candidate | Votes | % | ±% |
|---|---|---|---|---|
| National | John Sharp | 32,216 | 52.3 | +24.0 |
| Labor | John Wright | 25,207 | 40.9 | −3.5 |
| Democrats | Alan Blackshaw | 2,849 | 4.6 | +1.9 |
| Independent | Reen Dixon | 1,356 | 2.2 | +2.2 |
| Total formal votes | | 61,628 | 97.1 | |
| Informal votes | | 1,826 | 2.9 | |
| Turnout | | 63,454 | 95.2 | |
Two-party-preferred result
| National | John Sharp | 34,643 | 56.2 | +5.0 |
| Labor | John Wright | 26,977 | 43.8 | −5.0 |
| National hold | | Swing | +5.0 | |

==== 1984 ====
1984 Australian federal election: Gilmore
| Party | Candidate | Votes | % | ±% |
|---|---|---|---|---|
| Labor | Bob Stephens | 25,812 | 44.4 | −1.6 |
| National | John Sharp | 16,463 | 28.3 | +13.8 |
| Liberal | Noel Anderson | 12,213 | 21.0 | −11.9 |
| Nuclear Disarmament | Rodney Lander | 2,003 | 3.4 | +3.4 |
| Democrats | John Sanders | 1,595 | 2.7 | −1.6 |
| Independent | Ronald Sarina | 114 | 0.2 | +0.2 |
| Total formal votes | | 58,200 | 95.9 | |
| Informal votes | | 2,458 | 4.1 | |
| Turnout | | 60,658 | 94.8 | |
Two-party-preferred result
| National | John Sharp | 29,800 | 51.2 | +51.2 |
| Labor | Bob Stephens | 28,378 | 48.8 | −1.7 |
| National notional gain from Labor | | Swing | +1.7 | |
