= Electoral results for the Division of Paterson =

Election results for the federal seat of Paterson, New South Wales, Australia

This is a list of electoral results for the Division of Paterson in Australian federal elections from the division's creation in 1949 until its abolition in 1984, and then from its recreation in 1993 until the present.

== Members ==
First incarnation (1949–1984)
Member	Party	Term
Allen Fairhall	Liberal	1949–1969
Frank O'Keefe	Country, National	1969–1984
Second incarnation (1993–present)
Member	Party	Term
Bob Horne	Labor	1993–1996
Bob Baldwin	Liberal	1996–1998
Bob Horne	Labor	1998–2001
Bob Baldwin	Liberal	2001–2016
Meryl Swanson	Labor	2016–present

== Election results ==
=== Elections in the 2020s ===
==== 2025 ====
2025 Australian federal election: Paterson
Party	Candidate	Votes	%	±%
Independent	Hod Holding			
Labor	Meryl Swanson			
One Nation	Arnon Wither			
Independent	Philip Penfold			
Greens	Paul Johns			
Liberal	Laurence Antcliff			
Family First	Sandra Lyn Briggs			
Independent	April Maree Scott			
Trumpet of Patriots	Peter N Arena			
Legalise Cannabis	Daniel Dryden			
Total formal votes				
Informal votes				
Turnout				

==== 2022 ====
2022 Australian federal election: Paterson
Party	Candidate	Votes	%	±%
Labor	Meryl Swanson	46,725	40.67	−0.41
Liberal	Brooke Vitnell	42,142	36.68	+4.16
One Nation	Neil Turner	9,363	8.15	−6.01
Greens	Louise Ihlein	8,677	7.55	+0.65
United Australia	Jason Olbourne	4,474	3.89	+0.28
Informed Medical Options	Angela Ketas	1,883	1.64	+1.64
Liberal Democrats	Sonia Bailey	1,621	1.41	+1.41
Total formal votes		114,885	94.93	+0.78
Informal votes		6,142	5.07	−0.78
Turnout		121,027	91.66	−1.58
Two-party-preferred result
Labor	Meryl Swanson	61,247	53.31	−1.73
Liberal	Brooke Vitnell	53,638	46.69	+1.73
Labor hold		Swing	−1.73	

Alluvial diagram for preference flows in the seat of Paterson in the 2022 federal election. indicates at what stage the winning candidate had over 50% of the votes and was declared the winner.

=== Elections in the 2010s ===
==== 2019 ====
2019 Australian federal election: Paterson
Party	Candidate	Votes	%	±%
Labor	Meryl Swanson	44,288	41.08	−4.98
Liberal	Sachin Joshi	35,059	32.52	+1.01
One Nation	Neil Turner	15,269	14.16	+1.11
Greens	Jan Davis	7,439	6.90	+1.11
United Australia	Graham Burston	3,888	3.61	+3.61
Christian Democrats	Christopher Vale	1,876	1.74	−0.32
Total formal votes		107,819	94.15	−0.96
Informal votes		6,694	5.85	+0.96
Turnout		114,513	93.24	−0.25
Two-party-preferred result
Labor	Meryl Swanson	59,348	55.04	−5.70
Liberal	Sachin Joshi	48,471	44.96	+5.70
Labor hold		Swing	−5.70	

==== 2016 ====
2016 Australian federal election: Paterson
Party	Candidate	Votes	%	±%
Labor	Meryl Swanson	46,090	46.06	+6.22
Liberal	Karen Howard	31,527	31.51	+0.62
One Nation	Graham Burston	13,056	13.05	+11.62
Greens	John Brown	5,797	5.79	−0.56
Christian Democrats	Peter Arena	2,058	2.06	−0.09
Rise Up Australia	Brian Clare	1,007	1.01	+0.45
Citizens Electoral Council	Peter Davis	533	0.53	−0.12
Total formal votes		100,068	95.11	+1.31
Informal votes		5,143	4.89	−1.31
Turnout		105,211	93.49	+0.37
Two-party-preferred result
Labor	Meryl Swanson	60,779	60.74	+10.47
Liberal	Karen Howard	39,289	39.26	−10.47
Labor notional hold		Swing	+10.47	

==== 2013 ====
2013 Australian federal election: Paterson
Party	Candidate	Votes	%	±%
Liberal	Bob Baldwin	46,922	53.86	+2.56
Labor	Bay Marshall	25,811	29.63	−8.63
Greens	John Brown	5,812	6.67	+0.68
Palmer United	Jayson Packett	5,451	6.26	+6.26
Christian Democrats	Anna Balfour	1,854	2.13	+1.07
Rise Up Australia	Bob Holz	877	1.01	+1.01
Citizens Electoral Council	Peter Davis	390	0.45	+0.45
Total formal votes		87,117	94.83	+0.47
Informal votes		4,746	5.17	−0.47
Turnout		91,863	94.60	−0.16
Two-party-preferred result
Liberal	Bob Baldwin	52,080	59.78	+4.45
Labor	Bay Marshall	35,037	40.22	−4.45
Liberal hold		Swing	+4.45	

==== 2010 ====
2010 Australian federal election: Paterson
Party	Candidate	Votes	%	±%
Liberal	Bob Baldwin	42,262	51.30	+4.73
Labor	Jim Arneman	31,522	38.26	−4.69
Greens	Jan Davis	4,936	5.99	+0.72
One Nation	Kevin Leayr	1,044	1.27	+0.32
Christian Democrats	Anna Balfour	870	1.06	−0.15
Independent	Josef Wiedenhorn	699	0.85	+0.85
Family First	Veronica Lambert	674	0.82	+0.16
	Paul Hennelly	379	0.46	+0.46
Total formal votes		82,386	94.36	−2.04
Informal votes		4,924	5.64	+2.04
Turnout		87,310	94.75	−0.98
Two-party-preferred result
Liberal	Bob Baldwin	45,582	55.33	+4.75
Labor	Jim Arneman	36,804	44.67	−4.75
Liberal hold		Swing	+4.75	

=== Elections in the 2000s ===
==== 2007 ====
2007 Australian federal election: Paterson
Party	Candidate	Votes	%	±%
Liberal	Bob Baldwin	40,466	48.22	+1.72
Labor	Jim Arneman	35,291	42.06	+5.76
Greens	Judy Donnelly	4,344	5.18	+0.70
Fishing Party	Paul Hennelly	1,073	1.28	+0.48
Christian Democrats	Heather Haynes	1,010	1.20	+0.81
One Nation	John Hamberger	832	0.99	−0.97
Family First	Christopher Stokes	559	0.67	−0.25
Citizens Electoral Council	Tony King	341	0.41	−0.89
Total formal votes		83,916	96.43	+2.24
Informal votes		3,106	3.57	−2.24
Turnout		87,022	96.15	+0.37
Two-party-preferred result
Liberal	Bob Baldwin	43,228	51.51	−4.81
Labor	Jim Arneman	40,688	48.49	+4.81
Liberal hold		Swing	−4.81	

==== 2004 ====
2004 Australian federal election: Paterson
Party	Candidate	Votes	%	±%
Liberal	Bob Baldwin	41,289	51.99	+12.08
Labor	Giovanna Kozary	28,633	36.05	−4.70
Greens	Aina Ranke	3,303	4.16	+1.44
One Nation	Charlie Griffith	1,417	1.78	−3.71
Veterans	Bruce McKenzie	987	1.24	+1.24
Fishing Party	Paul Hennelly	778	0.98	+0.05
Citizens Electoral Council	Tony King	727	0.92	+0.48
Family First	Larissa Robb	681	0.86	+0.86
Independent	Mike Tuffy	677	0.85	+0.85
Democrats	Brett Paterson	577	0.73	−1.84
Independent	Neil Smith	351	0.44	+0.44
Total formal votes		79,420	93.87	−2.52
Informal votes		5,183	6.13	+2.52
Turnout		84,603	96.08	−0.57
Two-party-preferred result
Liberal	Bob Baldwin	45,244	56.97	+5.55
Labor	Giovanna Kozary	34,178	43.03	−5.55
Liberal hold		Swing	+5.55	

==== 2001 ====
2001 Australian federal election: Paterson
Party	Candidate	Votes	%	±%
Labor	Bob Horne	31,430	40.75	+0.16
Liberal	Bob Baldwin	30,781	39.91	+7.17
National	Ian Shaw	5,544	7.19	−2.47
One Nation	Paul Cary	4,233	5.49	−3.84
Greens	Aina Ranke	2,095	2.72	+0.87
Democrats	Sharon Davies	1,979	2.57	+0.44
Fishing Party	Paul Hennelly	720	0.93	+0.93
Citizens Electoral Council	Tony King	339	0.44	−0.36
Total formal votes		77,121	96.39	−0.20
Informal votes		2,890	3.61	+0.20
Turnout		80,011	97.27	
Two-party-preferred result
Liberal	Bob Baldwin	39,658	51.42	+0.16
Labor	Bob Horne	37,463	48.58	−0.16
Liberal notional hold		Swing	+0.16	

=== Elections in the 1990s ===
==== 1998 ====
1998 Australian federal election: Paterson
Party	Candidate	Votes	%	±%
Labor	Bob Horne	33,066	43.13	−0.22
Liberal	Bob Baldwin	31,212	40.71	−4.96
One Nation	Paul Fuller	6,355	8.29	+8.29
Greens	Jan Davis	1,577	2.06	−1.49
Democrats	Geoffrey Rutledge	1,467	1.91	−3.08
Christian Democrats	David Murray	957	1.25	−1.20
Citizens Electoral Council	Anthony King	666	0.87	+0.87
Independent	Michelle Moffat	608	0.79	+0.79
Independent	Andrew Buchan	448	0.58	+0.58
Democratic Socialist	Alison Dellit	164	0.21	+0.21
Independent	Paul Unger	145	0.19	+0.19
Total formal votes		76,665	96.67	−1.07
Informal votes		2,643	3.33	+1.07
Turnout		79,308	96.69	−0.66
Two-party-preferred result
Labor	Bob Horne	39,268	51.22	+1.65
Liberal	Bob Baldwin	37,397	48.78	−1.65
Labor gain from Liberal		Swing	+1.65	

==== 1996 ====
1996 Australian federal election: Paterson
Party	Candidate	Votes	%	±%
Liberal	Bob Baldwin	34,113	45.67	+10.40
Labor	Bob Horne	32,378	43.35	−4.16
Democrats	Bob Symington	3,727	4.99	+2.98
Greens	Jan Davis	2,647	3.54	+0.69
Call to Australia	Trevor Carrick	1,829	2.45	+2.45
Total formal votes		74,694	97.74	+0.11
Informal votes		1,730	2.26	−0.11
Turnout		76,424	97.36	+0.36
Two-party-preferred result
Liberal	Bob Baldwin	37,519	50.43	+3.73
Labor	Bob Horne	36,885	49.57	−3.73
Liberal gain from Labor		Swing	+3.73	

==== 1993 ====
1993 Australian federal election: Paterson
Party	Candidate	Votes	%	±%
Labor	Bob Horne	33,012	47.50	+7.05
Liberal	Bob Roberts	24,510	35.27	+19.95
National	Gary Watson	4,719	6.79	−22.47
Greens	Bernadette Smith	1,981	2.85	+2.85
Democrats	Rodger Riach	1,396	2.01	−12.74
Independent	Bruce MacKenzie	1,348	1.94	+1.94
Independent	Bernie Neville	1,295	1.86	+1.86
Natural Law	Alan McDonald	810	1.17	+1.17
Confederate Action	Ron Franks	421	0.61	+0.61
Total formal votes		69,492	97.63	−0.05
Informal votes		1,688	2.37	+0.05
Turnout		71,180	96.99	
Two-party-preferred result
Labor	Bob Horne	37,006	53.30	+3.27
Liberal	Bob Roberts	32,421	46.70	−3.27
Labor notional hold		Swing	+3.27	

Division re-created

==== 1984 - 1993 ====
District abolished Division abolished

=== Elections in the 1980s ===
==== 1983 ====
1983 Australian federal election: Paterson
Party	Candidate	Votes	%	±%
National	Frank O'Keefe	37,028	54.1	−1.0
Labor	Michael Williams	28,412	41.5	+3.8
Democrats	Darrel Woodhouse	3,048	4.5	−1.9
Total formal votes		68,488	98.6	
Informal votes		938	1.4	
Turnout		69,426	95.0	
Two-party-preferred result
National	Frank O'Keefe		55.9	−1.8
Labor	Michael Williams		44.1	+1.8
National hold		Swing	−1.8	

==== 1980 ====
1980 Australian federal election: Paterson
Party	Candidate	Votes	%	±%
National Country	Frank O'Keefe	36,416	55.1	−2.5
Labor	Francis Murray	24,946	37.7	+3.4
Democrats	Denis Driver	4,265	6.4	−0.3
Independent	William Reeve-Parker	516	0.8	+0.8
Total formal votes		66,143	98.3	
Informal votes		1,124	1.7	
Turnout		67,267	95.3	
Two-party-preferred result
National Country	Frank O'Keefe		57.7	−4.5
Labor	Francis Murray		42.3	+4.5
National Country hold		Swing	−4.5	

=== Elections in the 1970s ===
==== 1977 ====
1977 Australian federal election: Paterson
Party	Candidate	Votes	%	±%
National Country	Frank O'Keefe	36,740	57.6	+0.9
Labor	Kerry Scott	21,862	34.3	−6.6
Democrats	Paul Baker	4,250	6.7	+6.7
Independent	William O'Donnell	923	1.4	+1.4
Total formal votes		63,775	98.2	
Informal votes		1,188	1.8	
Turnout		64,963	95.7	
Two-party-preferred result
National Country	Frank O'Keefe		62.2	+3.8
Labor	Kerry Scott		37.8	−3.8
National Country hold		Swing	+3.8	

==== 1975 ====
1975 Australian federal election: Paterson
Party	Candidate	Votes	%	±%
National Country	Frank O'Keefe	30,985	55.6	+6.3
Labor	Noel Unicomb	23,397	42.0	−7.0
Independent	Barnard Hassett	861	1.5	+1.5
Independent	Marc Aussie-Stone	505	0.9	+0.9
Total formal votes		55,748	98.6	
Informal votes		780	1.4	
Turnout		56,528	96.0	
Two-party-preferred result
National Country	Frank O'Keefe		57.3	+7.0
Labor	Noel Unicomb		42.7	−7.0
National Country hold		Swing	+7.0	

==== 1974 ====
1974 Australian federal election: Paterson
Party	Candidate	Votes	%	±%
Country	Frank O'Keefe	26,418	49.3	+2.2
Labor	Noel Unicomb	26,261	49.0	+1.0
Australia	Robert Fowler	916	1.7	−0.4
Total formal votes		53,595	98.8	
Informal votes		658	1.2	
Turnout		54,253	95.9	
Two-party-preferred result
Country	Frank O'Keefe	26,935	50.3	−0.1
Labor	Noel Unicomb	26,660	49.7	+0.1
Country hold		Swing	−0.1	

==== 1972 ====
1972 Australian federal election: Paterson
Party	Candidate	Votes	%	±%
Labor	Noel Unicomb	23,430	48.0	+10.5
Country	Frank O'Keefe	22,970	47.1	+17.7
Democratic Labor	Aubrey Barr	1,376	2.8	−1.2
Australia	Alan Capp	1,005	2.1	+1.6
Total formal votes		48,781	98.6	
Informal votes		682	1.4	
Turnout		49,463	96.9	
Two-party-preferred result
Country	Frank O'Keefe	24,609	50.4	−7.1
Labor	Noel Unicomb	24,172	49.6	+7.1
Country hold		Swing	−7.1	

=== Elections in the 1960s ===
==== 1969 ====
1969 Australian federal election: Paterson
Party	Candidate	Votes	%	±%
Labor	Francis Murray	16,741	37.5	+4.4
Country	Frank O'Keefe	13,150	29.4	+29.4
Liberal	John Jobling	12,500	28.0	−31.7
Democratic Labor	Jack Collins	1,805	4.0	−3.2
Independent	Adrian Edwards	252	0.6	+0.6
Australia	Ted Fletcher	227	0.5	+0.5
Total formal votes		44,675	96.9	
Informal votes		1,451	3.1	
Turnout		46,126	96.6	
Two-party-preferred result
Country	Frank O'Keefe	25,692	57.5	+57.5
Labor	Francis Murray	18,983	42.5	+9.1
Country gain from Liberal		Swing	−9.1	

==== 1966 ====
1966 Australian federal election: Paterson
Party	Candidate	Votes	%	±%
Liberal	Allen Fairhall	25,437	63.0	+1.6
Labor	Francis Murray	12,045	29.8	−8.8
Democratic Labor	Aubrey Barr	2,889	7.2	+7.2
Total formal votes		40,371	97.7	
Informal votes		965	2.3	
Turnout		41,336	96.6	
Two-party-preferred result
Liberal	Allen Fairhall		69.0	+7.6
Labor	Francis Murray		31.0	−7.6
Liberal hold		Swing	+7.6	

==== 1963 ====
1963 Australian federal election: Paterson
Party	Candidate	Votes	%	±%
Liberal	Allen Fairhall	24,695	61.4	+10.5
Labor	Archibald Jones	15,503	38.6	−4.2
Total formal votes		40,198	99.0	
Informal votes		396	1.0	
Turnout		40,594	96.6	
Liberal hold		Swing	+6.3	

==== 1961 ====
1961 Australian federal election: Paterson
Party	Candidate	Votes	%	±%
Liberal	Allen Fairhall	20,155	50.9	−2.7
Labor	Bob Brown	16,952	42.8	+6.5
Democratic Labor	Aubrey Barr	2,490	6.3	−3.8
Total formal votes		39,597	98.2	
Informal votes		733	1.8	
Turnout		40,330	96.3	
Two-party-preferred result
Liberal	Allen Fairhall		55.1	−6.8
Labor	Bob Brown		44.9	+6.8
Liberal hold		Swing	−6.8	

=== Elections in the 1950s ===
==== 1958 ====
1958 Australian federal election: Paterson
Party	Candidate	Votes	%	±%
Liberal	Allen Fairhall	21,064	53.6	−6.6
Labor	Alan Lloyd	14,248	36.3	−3.5
Democratic Labor	Douglas Drinkwater	3,969	10.1	+10.1
Total formal votes		39,281	97.7	
Informal votes		933	2.3	
Turnout		40,214	96.7	
Two-party-preferred result
Liberal	Allen Fairhall		61.9	+1.7
Labor	Alan Lloyd		38.1	−1.7
Liberal hold		Swing	+1.7	

==== 1955 ====
1955 Australian federal election: Paterson
Party	Candidate	Votes	%	±%
Liberal	Allen Fairhall	23,623	60.2	+6.9
Labor	William Harvey	15,601	39.8	−6.4
Total formal votes		39,224	98.0	
Informal votes		800	2.0	
Turnout		40,024	96.8	
Liberal hold		Swing	+6.7	

==== 1954 ====
1954 Australian federal election: Paterson
Party	Candidate	Votes	%	±%
Liberal	Allen Fairhall	21,870	54.5	−2.6
Labor	Kevin Barlow	18,255	45.5	+2.6
Total formal votes		40,125	99.0	
Informal votes		422	1.0	
Turnout		40,547	96.9	
Liberal hold		Swing	−2.6	

==== 1951 ====
1951 Australian federal election: Paterson
Party	Candidate	Votes	%	±%
Liberal	Allen Fairhall	21,677	57.1	+27.0
Labor	Cecil Robinson	16,312	42.9	+5.0
Total formal votes		37,989	98.1	
Informal votes		736	1.9	
Turnout		38,725	97.1	
Liberal hold		Swing	−1.4	

=== Elections in the 1940s ===
==== 1949 ====
1949 Australian federal election: Paterson
Party	Candidate	Votes	%	±%
Labor	Cecil Robinson	14,089	37.9	−7.8
Liberal	Allen Fairhall	11,189	30.1	+12.2
Country	Arsie Dorsman	5,293	14.2	+0.6
Country	John McGirr	3,842	10.3	+10.3
Country	Robert Clendinning	2,101	5.7	+5.7
Country	Ernest Slater	656	1.8	+1.8
Total formal votes		37,170	96.7	
Informal votes		1,267	3.3	
Turnout		38,437	97.4	
Two-party-preferred result
Liberal	Allen Fairhall	21,741	58.5	+58.5
Labor	Cecil Robinson	15,429	41.5	−8.6
Liberal notional gain from Labor		Swing	+8.6	
