= Fiona Phillips (politician) =

Australian politician (born 1970)

Fiona Phillips MP
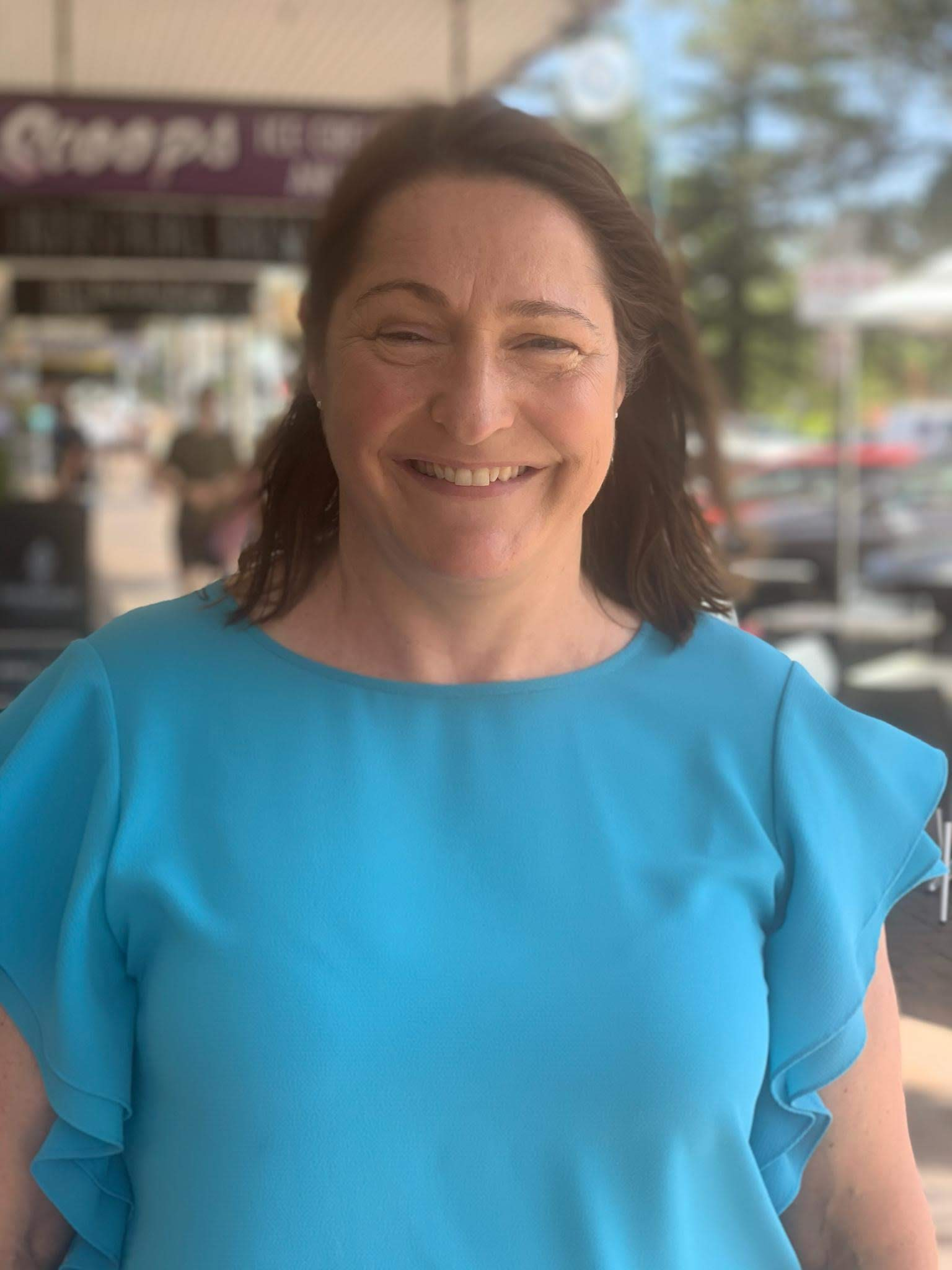

Member of Parliament for Gilmore
- Incumbent
- Assumed office 18 May 2019
- Preceded by: Ann Sudmalis

Personal details
- Born: Fiona Evon Boyd; 18 February 1970 (age 56) Nowra, New South Wales, Australia
- Party: Australian Labor Party
- Education: University of Newcastle; University of New South Wales
- Occupation: Business operations manager and TAFE lecturer
- Website: fionaphillips.com.au

Fiona Evon Phillips (née Boyd, born 18 February 1970) is an Australian politician who has been the Labor member for Gilmore in the House of Representatives since the 2019 Australian federal election.

In 2022, Phillips was re-elected over Liberal candidate Andrew Constance by 373 votes. Her narrow victory made Gilmore the most marginal electorate in Australia for this election. She won the seat again at the 2025 election this time by almost 10,000 votes.

== Early life ==
Phillips was born on 18 February 1970 in Nowra, New South Wales. She grew up on dairy farms in Terara and Worrigee, and attended Terara Public School and Nowra High School. Her father died of heart disease when she was 21. She holds the degrees of Bachelor of Economics from the University of Newcastle and Master of Business from the University of New South Wales.

Before entering parliament Phillips worked as a senior industrial relations officer for Westpac (1991–1995), human resources officer for the City of Shoalhaven (1996–1997), placement coordinator for the Shoalhaven Schools Workplace Learning Program (1997–2002), lecturer at TAFE NSW (2002–2017), commerce tutor at the University of Wollongong (2002–2015), and business operations manager in the Navy Aviation Systems Program Office at HMAS Albatross (2007–2009).

== Politics ==
Phillips became involved in politics as part of a campaign to save a local swimming pool. After joining the ALP she served as president of the South Coast state electoral council and as a member of the state administrative committee and Country Labor committee. She also worked as an electorate officer for Stephen Jones from 2016 to 2017.

Phillips unsuccessfully stood for the ALP in South Coast at the 2015 state election and in Gilmore at the 2016 federal election. She was elected in Gilmore at the 2019 election with a two-party-preferred swing of just over 3 points, defeating the high-profile Liberal candidate Warren Mundine after the retirement of the incumbent Liberal MP Ann Sudmalis.

Phillips is a member of the Labor Left faction.
