= Ann Sudmalis =

Australian politician (born 1955)

Member of the Australian Parliament for Gilmore
- In office 7 September 2013 – 11 April 2019
- Preceded by: Joanna Gash
- Succeeded by: Fiona Phillips

Personal details
- Born: Ann Elizabeth Hardinge; 16 September 1955 (age 71) Milton, New South Wales, Australia
- Party: Liberal Party of Australia
- Children: 3
- Profession: Teacher and politician
- Website: annsudmalismp.com.au

Ann Elizabeth Sudmalis (née Hardinge; born 16 September 1955) is an Australian former politician. She was a Liberal member of the Australian House of Representatives, representing the Division of Gilmore in New South Wales, from September 2013 until April 2019.

== Early life ==
Sudmalis was born in Milton, New South Wales. Her father, Norris Hardinge, was a manual arts teacher and freelance photographer for the local newspaper. Her mother, Valerie, was a British immigrant. Sudmalis has one brother, Stuart. As a child, Sudmalis and her family moved to Sydney to live with her grandmother.

Sudmalis completed an undergraduate Bachelor of Science degree at Australian National University and a diploma in Education at Canberra College of Advanced Education.

Sudmalis worked as a waitress, cook and cleaner from 1974 to 1977, and as a science teacher for 10 years, from 1979 to 1988, in Canberra.

Sudmalis and her family moved to Kiama where she started a fudge business, Gran's Fudge, with her husband in 1988. In her maiden speech, Sudmalis said of this business "We changed a small cottage industry with just three employees to a business with over 40 staff, exporting to six international destinations." She was company director for 17 years, from 1988 to 2005.

In 2003 Sudmalis spent six months in India as a volunteer teacher. In she 2006 worked as a community art teacher. Sudmalis completed a master's degree in education at Charles Sturt University and in 2011 taught part-time at the University of Wollongong as a tutor for the Diploma of Education program. Sudmalis worked as an electorate officer from 2007 to 2012. She undertook a Certificate IV in Visual Arts in 2012.

Sudmalis has three adult children.

== Political career ==
Sudmalis served as a councillor on the Kiama Council and worked as an advisor to Joanna Gash, the member for Gilmore between 1996 and 2013. At the 2007 New South Wales state election, Sudmalis contested the seat of Kiama, running unsuccessfully against Labor incumbent Matt Brown.

Following Gash's decision to retire from politics at the 2013 federal election, Sudmalis won Liberal pre-selection for Gilmore in April 2012, and was elected with 52.65% of the two-party preferred vote.

In November 2014 it was announced that the Australian government would be reducing the ABC budget by $254 million, in spite of a pre-election promise by Tony Abbott not to cut the ABC's funding. The ABC managing director, Mark Scott, later announced where the cuts would affect, one area of which was the ABC's Nowra office. Sudmalis released an open letter to Mark Scott declaring his decision "appalling", "deplorable" and that he was "taking the easy way out" by allowing the Nowra branch to be closed and not targeting more cuts to metropolitan areas.

In 2015 Sudmalis claimed that her opposition to same-sex marriage was based on the views of her conservative constituents. A survey that Sudmalis sent to her own mailing list resulted in 1552 community members in support of marriage equality versus 893 opposing it. Sudmalis made clear her support for a national plebiscite to decide the issue.

At the end of 2015, the NSW Liberal Government proposed the forced council amalgamation between Kiama Council and Shoalhaven City Council. Sudmalis condemned the proposal along with the Liberal State member for Kiama, Gareth Ward. At a community meeting in April 2016, Sudmalis accidentally signed a petition that indicated that she would vote against herself and her Liberal state party colleagues at subsequent federal and state elections in protest. A preselection challenge was discussed at local liberal branch level but did not eventuate.

Sudmalis was narrowly re-elected at the 2016 federal election with a margin of 0.7%, making Gilmore the most marginal federal seat in New South Wales.

Following the decision of the Australian Fair Work Commission to reduce penalty rates of hospitality, retail, fast-food and pharmacy workers, Sudmalis described the change as a "gift" to young people, prompting a sustained attack from the Opposition in question time.

On 15 August 2017, it was confirmed that Sudmalis was seeking confirmation of her possible British citizenship, which would render her unable to be a member of parliament.

During her time as local member the Liberal party branches in the Gilmore electorate have collapsed in numbers. A preselection challenge was again discussed prior to the next Australian federal election due to her rising unpopularity. However, Prime Minister Malcolm Turnbull, treasurer Scott Morrison, and other senior Liberal party members, personally intervened to ensure Sudmalis was preselected for the next election. Despite that, she announced on 17 September 2018 that she would not contest the coming election, blaming what she called ego-driven bullying, betrayal and backstabbing by Gareth Ward, a Liberal member of state parliament for an electorate that overlaps hers.

Parliament of Australia
Preceded by Joanna Gash	Member for Gilmore; 2013–2019	Succeeded by Fiona Phillips
