= Meryl Swanson =

Australian politician and radio host

Meryl Swanson MP
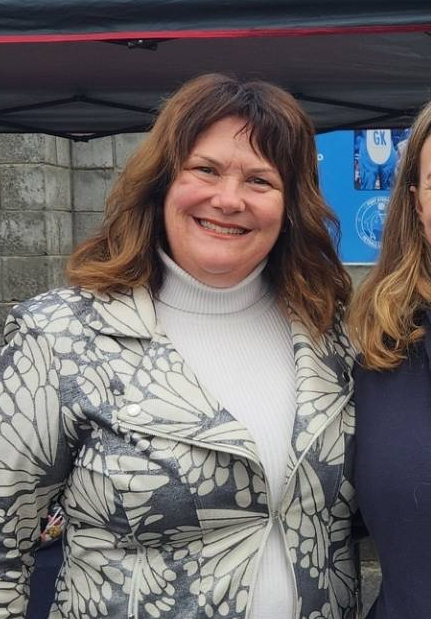
- Swanson in 2025

Member of the Australian Parliament for Paterson
- Incumbent
- Assumed office 2 July 2016
- Preceded by: Bob Baldwin

Personal details
- Born: Meryl Jane Partridge; 3 September 1970 (age 56) Kurri Kurri, New South Wales, Australia
- Citizenship: Australian
- Party: Australian Labor Party
- Spouse: Nick Swanson
- Education: University of Newcastle
- Website: www.merylswanson.com.au

Meryl Jane Swanson (née Partridge; born 3 September 1970) is an Australian politician and former radio presenter. She is a member of the Australian Labor Party (ALP) and has represented the Division of Paterson in the Australian House of Representatives since the 2016 federal election.

== Early life ==
Swanson was born on 3 September 1970 in Kurri Kurri, New South Wales. She grew up in nearby Heddon Greta. She holds the degrees of Bachelor of Commerce and Bachelor of Arts from the University of Newcastle. After graduating she worked in broadcasting for several years, as a researcher, producer and reporter for NBN Television and as a presenter with 2KO. She later worked as a business manager for the Hunter Region Organisation of Councils (1993–1996), as an electorate officer for Joel Fitzgibbon (1996–1997), and as executive director of Hunter Tourism (1997). After starting a family she operated a café for several years and then returned to radio with 2HD and 2NUR.

== Politics ==
Swanson was elected to parliament at the 2016 federal election, winning the seat for the Labor Party following the retirement of incumbent Liberal MP Bob Baldwin. She was assisted by a favourable redistribution prior to the election. She retained the seat at the 2019 election despite a five-point swing against the ALP.

After the 2019 election, Swanson stated that she would support Joel Fitzgibbon for the leadership of the ALP if he decided to stand. In August 2020 she was appointed Shadow Assistant Minister for Defence in Anthony Albanese's shadow ministry.

Following the ALP's victory at the 2022 election, Swanson was appointed chair of the House Standing Committee on Agriculture. She oversaw what she described as "the most substantial inquiry into Australia's food systems in a decade", with its report delivered in December 2023 recommending the government develop a national food plan, appoint a minister for food and establish a food council.

After the 2025 election, the Agriculture Committee was renamed the Primary Industries Committee and Swanson was retained as its Chair.

=== Political positions ===
Swanson is a member of the Labor Right faction. In March 2021 she "urged MPs [...] to be careful about the way they talked about taking action on climate change, arguing that coal workers should not feel demonised as Australia transitions to a low-emissions future".

== Personal life ==
Swanson has two daughters with her husband Nick and lives on a 50-acre (20 ha) property in Buchanan. As of 2019 she was a co-owner and director of Swanridge Investments Pty Ltd, which sells horse rugs.

Australian House of Representatives
Preceded by Bob Baldwin	Member for Paterson; 2016–present	Incumbent
