= Division of Gilmore =

Australian federal electoral division

Coordinates: 35.067°S 150.398°E

Gilmore Australian House of Representatives Division
- Interactive map of electorate boundaries from the 2025 federal election
- Created: 1984
- MP: Fiona Phillips
- Party: Labor
- Namesake: Dame Mary Gilmore
- Electors: 129,095 (2025)
- Area: 6,322 km^{2} (2,440.9 sq mi)
- Demographic: Rural
Electorates around Gilmore:
Hume	Whitlam	Pacific Ocean
Eden-Monaro	Gilmore	Fenner (Jervis Bay exclave)
Eden-Monaro	Eden-Monaro	Pacific Ocean

The Division of Gilmore is an Australian electoral division in the state of New South Wales. It lies on the South Coast between Kiama and Moruya.

== History ==
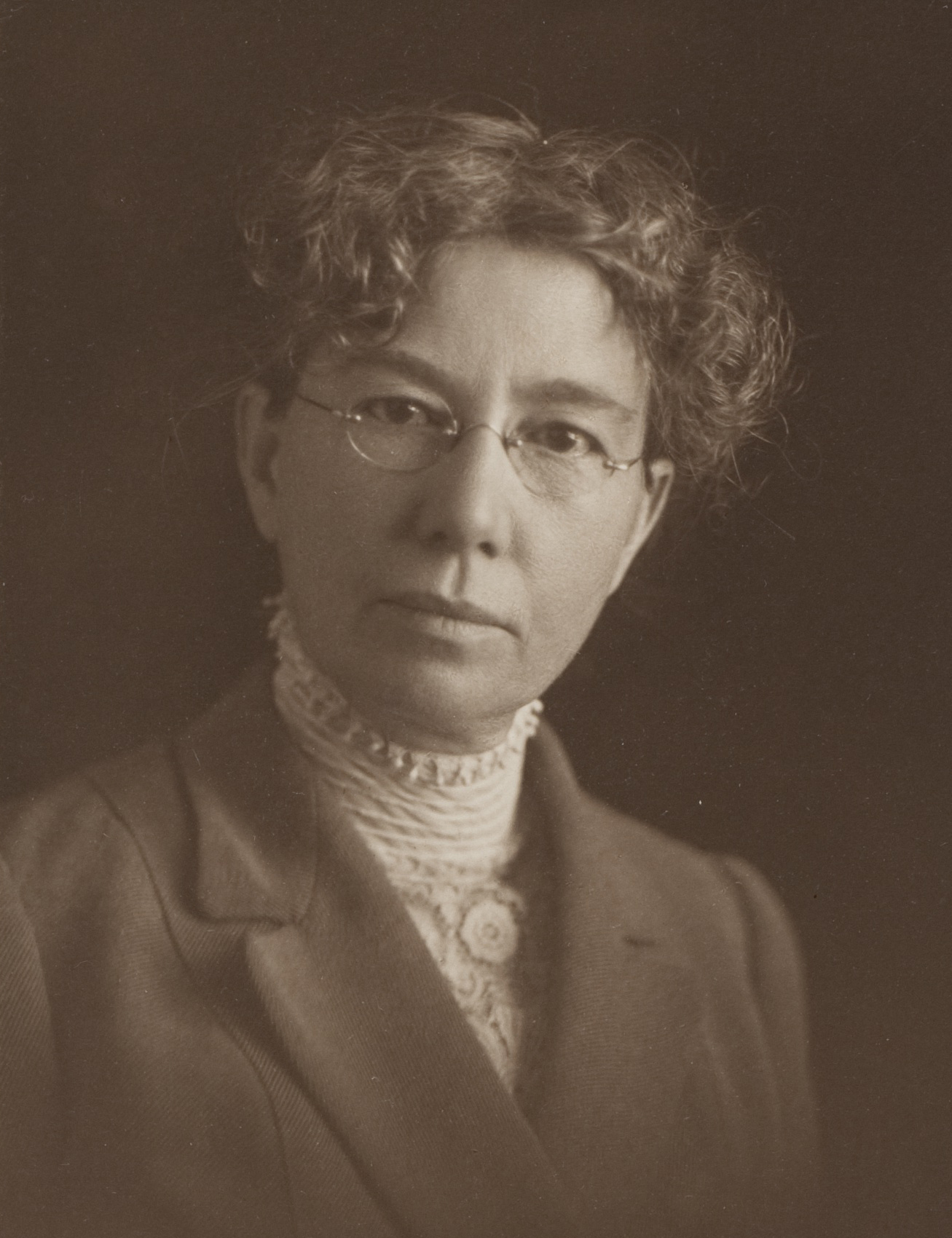
Dame Mary Gilmore, the division's namesake

The Division of Gilmore was created in 1984 when the House of Representatives was expanded, and was named after Dame Mary Gilmore, the poet and author. The seat was first won by John Sharp of the National Party. A redistribution in 1992 shrunk the seat to cover just the New South Wales South Coast, with majority of the area in the west ceded to the adjacent seat of Hume. Following the redistribution, Sharp moved to Hume in the 1993 election. He would later be in the First Howard Ministry until he resigned in 1997 due to the "travel rorts affair".

The seat was won by the ALP's Peter Knott in 1993, but he was defeated at the 1996 election by Joanna Gash of the Liberal Party. The seat was considered marginal after the 1996 and 1998 elections, but a big swing in 2001 saw Gash hold the seat by a much larger margin. That was cut back to a margin of about 4 points in 2007.

Gilmore's boundaries were redrawn before the 2010 election, making the seat a notional Labor one, but Gash gained a 5.7-point swing. She announced her retirement in 2012, and was later elected Mayor of Shoalhaven.

At the 2013 federal election, Gash was succeeded by Liberal candidate Ann Sudmalis, who won despite a 2.7-point swing to Labor. Sudmalis suffered a further 3-point swing in the 2016 election, but narrowly won a second term by only 1,503 of the two-party-preferred vote. On 17 September 2018 Sudmalis announced that she would not contest the forthcoming election, blaming what she called ego-driven bullying, betrayal, and backstabbing by Gareth Ward, a Liberal member of state parliament for an electorate that overlaps hers.

On 22 January 2019 prime minister Scott Morrison announced that Warren Mundine would be the Liberal Party's candidate for the seat in the 2019 election, after Mundine joined the party that same day. Mundine, and former Liberal party member Grant Schultz, who ran as an independent, were defeated by the ALP's Fiona Phillips. She won the seat at the 2022 election by 379 votes and retained it in 2025 with an increased margin.

== Boundaries ==
Since 1984, federal electoral division boundaries in Australia have been determined at redistributions by a redistribution committee appointed by the Australian Electoral Commission. Redistributions occur for the boundaries of divisions in a particular state, and they occur every seven years, or sooner if a state's representation entitlement changes or when divisions of a state are malapportioned.

When the division was created in 1984, it originally included the areas of Goulburn, Southern Highlands and New South Wales South Coast, which were previously in the divisions of Hume, Eden-Monaro and Macarthur. In the 1992 redistribution, the seat was significantly shrunk in area, with most of the areas in the west lost to Hume, but gained further areas in the South Coast from the Throsby and Eden-Monaro.

Gilmore lost all remaining areas in the Southern Highlands in the 2006 redistribution, but also gained Batemans Bay from Eden-Monaro. As a result, Gilmore was shrunk to cover only the South Coast, which it still covers as of 2026. In 2009, Gilmore lost Batemans Bay back to Eden-Monaro but gained the southern portion of Shellharbour from Throsby. These changes were largely reversed in 2016, losing Shellharbour to Whitlam (which replaced Throsby) and regaining Batemans Bay.

In the 2024 redistribution, there were largely no changes to the boundaries. The only change was the loss of the small town of Tuross Head to Eden-Monaro.

The division is located in the Shoalhaven and the southern Illawarra regions. It covers all of the Kiama and Shoalhaven local government areas, and the northern and central parts of the Eurobodalla. The most northerly part of the electorate is Minnamurra and the most southerly part is in the northern outskirts of Tuross Head. The western boundary includes much of the Budawang and Morton National Parks.

Towns and suburbs includes Nowra, Minnamurra, Kiama, Gerringong, Berry, Kangaroo Valley, Bomaderry, Worrigee, Greenwell Point, Culburra Beach, Callala Bay, Sussex Inlet, Milton, Ulladulla, Batemans Bay and Moruya.

== Members ==
Image	Member	Party	Term	Notes
	John Sharp (1954–)	Nationals	1 December 1984 – 13 March 1993	Transferred to the Division of Hume
	Peter Knott (1956–2015)	Labor	13 March 1993 – 2 March 1996	Lost seat
	Joanna Gash (1944–)	Liberal	2 March 1996 – 5 August 2013	Retired
	Ann Sudmalis (1955–)	Liberal	7 September 2013 – 11 April 2019	Retired
	Fiona Phillips (1970–)	Labor	18 May 2019 – present	Incumbent

== Election results ==
2025 Australian federal election: Gilmore
Party	Candidate	Votes	%	±%
Labor	Fiona Phillips	42,342	38.13	+2.19
Liberal	Andrew Constance	38,247	34.44	−7.56
Independent	Kate Dezarnaulds	8,371	7.54	+7.54
Greens	Debbie Killian	7,932	7.14	−3.09
One Nation	John Hawke	5,557	5.00	+1.00
Legalise Cannabis	Adrian Carle	4,124	3.71	+3.71
Trumpet of Patriots	Melissa Wise	2,476	2.23	+2.23
Family First	Graham Brown	2,004	1.80	+1.80
Total formal votes		111,053	93.10	−2.47
Informal votes		8,225	6.90	+2.47
Turnout		119,278	92.47	+1.81
Two-party-preferred result
Labor	Fiona Phillips	61,223	55.13	+4.96
Liberal	Andrew Constance	49,830	44.87	−4.96
Labor hold		Swing	+4.96	
