= Paul Green (Australian politician) =

Australian politician

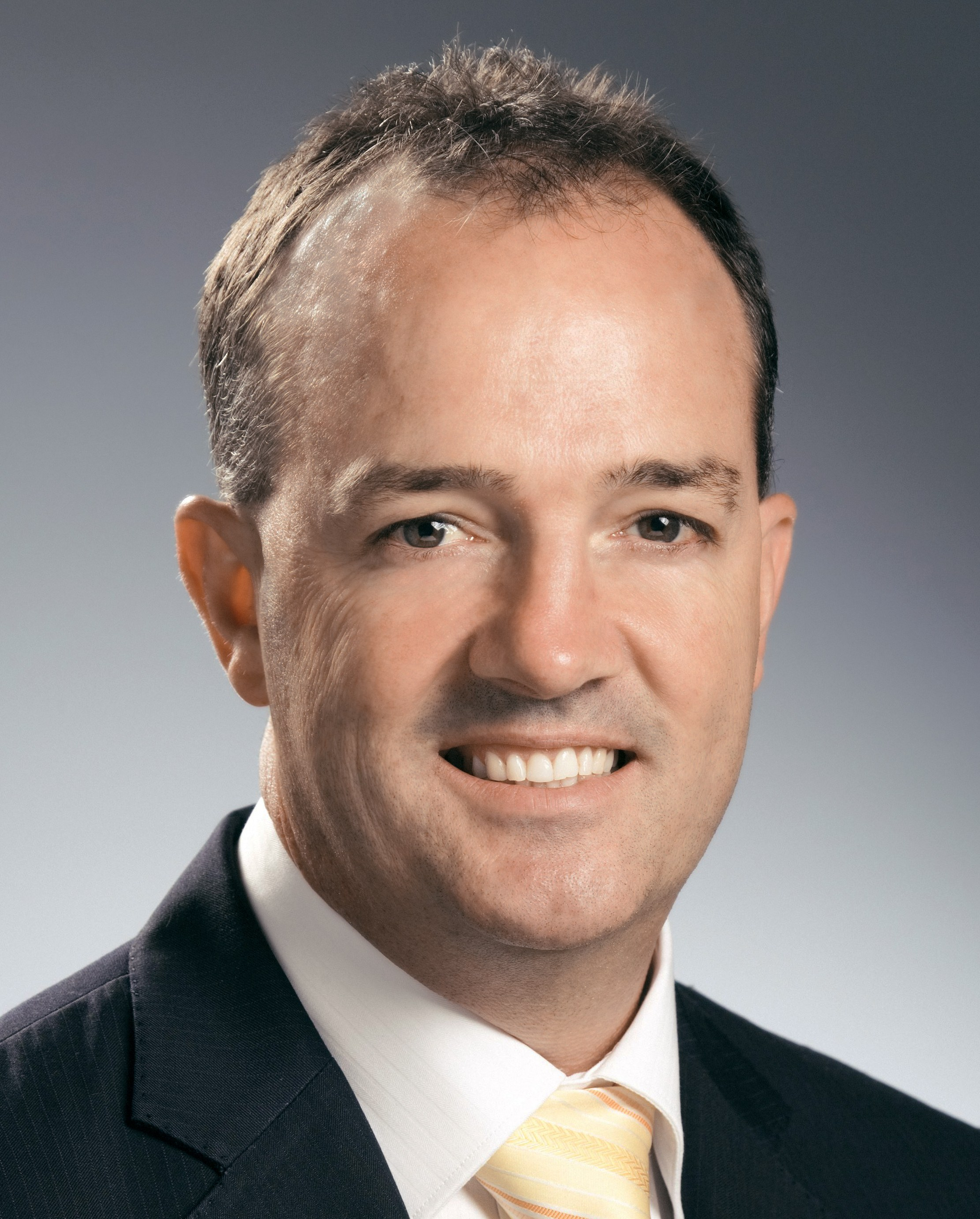

Member of Legislative Council of New South Wales
- In office 26 March 2011 – 23 March 2019

Mayor of Shoalhaven
- In office 13 September 2008 – 8 September 2012
- Preceded by: Greg Watson
- Succeeded by: Joanna Gash

Personal details
- Born: 28 May 1966 (age 60) Liverpool, New South Wales
- Party: Christian Democratic Party (2004−2019)
- Occupation: Registered nurse, businessman and pastor
- Website: paulgreen.com.au

Paul Green (born 28 May 1966 in Liverpool, New South Wales), an Australian former politician, was a member of the New South Wales Legislative Council representing the Christian Democratic Party (CDP) from 2011 to 2019.

== Early years and background ==
Green is a Christian and was a Pastor at the Mannahouse Ministries from 1994 to 2005. He completed a Bachelor of Nursing at the University of Wollongong and practiced as a registered nurse before starting a small business. He is also a photographer and videographer and studied leadership at Hillsong Bible College.

Paul Green has been a member of the South Coast Branch of the Christian Democratic Party since 2004.

== Political career ==
Prior to being elected to Parliament Paul Green was a Councillor for the City of Shoalhaven (2004–2012), Deputy Mayor from 2007 to 2008 and Mayor from 2008 to October 2012. He contested election to the Australian Senate in 2007 and 2010, however was unsuccessful in attaining a quota on both occasions. He also ran for the NSW Legislative Assembly seat of South Coast and received over 2,700 first preference votes – a +4% swing for the CDP.

At the 2011 election, Green was elected 19th out of 21 members elected to the Legislative Council. He, alongside Christian Democratic Party leader, Fred Nile, holds the balance of power in the New South Wales Legislative Council. The party advocates "a Christian response to policy and laws" and say that they are "committed to working with the Government of the day". At the 2019 election, Green was defeated after being overtaken by the Animal Justice Party on preferences. On 15 April he made a concession announcement after the release of final preference distribution results.

In November 2019, it was revealed that he is under suspension from the CDP.

Paul Green has been the chair or deputy chair of numerous Parliamentary committees including the Committee on the State Senate Bill 2015, Committee No. 6 – Planning and Environment, Committee No. 2 – Health and Community Services and the Committee on Electricity Supply, Demand and Prices in New South Wales.

In the 2021 local government elections, Green unsuccessfully attempted to reenter local politics by running for mayor of the City of Shoalhaven. He received 25.5% of the vote, placing second the Greens candidate.

== Political views ==
=== Modern Slavery Bill 2018 ===
Paul Green has been outspoken on the issue of modern slavery and slavery-like practices in Australia and New South Wales. In 2018, after chairing a committee looking into the issue, Green, and the Christian Democratic Party introduced Australia's first anti-modern slavery bill to the New South Wales Parliament. Paul Green said:

"The Bill paves the way for the appointment of the Anti-Slavery Commissioner, empowers government and commercial organisations to slave-proof supply-lines, and ensures a victim-centred approach for those who have fallen prey to this heinous crimes in our state. This Bill also strengthens laws with regard to child forced marriage and cybersex trafficking."

Introduced into the Legislative Assembly by Premier Gladys Berejiklian and supported by all sides of Parliament, the Modern Slavery Bill 2018 passed the Third Reading stage in the Lower House on 6 June 2018. The Sydney Archbishop, Glenn Davies, was one of those to strongly support the bill, saying:

“Human trafficking is an abhorrent form of modern slavery. It is a trans-national crime which preys upon the most vulnerable. Human trafficking should be abolished in all its forms from our world, along with other practices of enslavement, such as servitude, forced labour, debt bondage, organ trafficking, deceptive recruiting, as well as forced marriage and childhood brides. “Such practices are a blight on our society, as they were in the days of William Wilberforce, and I urge all people, especially Christians, to join the fight to eradicate slavery in all its forms.”

=== Other Issues ===
Besides modern slavery, Green has been outspoken on many other issues. These include housing affordability, electricity prices, regional water affordability, religious freedoms, animal justice, cyber-bullying, chaplains and scripture teachers in schools as well as SRE. In 2018, Paul Green was part of the Affordable Housing Conference and spoke about issues such as "homelessness, first home buyers’ housing affordability, social housing, impacts of rental stress collaborating to establish innovative ways to address the growing concerns within" the Australian housing industry. He has also been a vocal supporter of farmers – especially during the severe 2018 drought.

== In the Media ==
Paul Green and the Christian Democratic Party receive limited coverage in the Australian media. Mostly, this has come from mainstream Christian outlets such as Vision Christian Radio and Eternity News.

In mid-2018, Green was invited to speak on the US-based Arabic Christian Network, AlkarmaTV, that broadcasts to around 100 million people. He spoke about Christianity, the Christian worldview, and the Christian Democratic Party – in particular, the Modern Slavery Bill 2018.
