= Division of Paterson =

Australian federal electoral division

Paterson Australian House of Representatives Division
- Interactive map of electorate boundaries from the 2025 federal election
- Created: 1949
- Dates current: 1949–84, 1992–present
- MP: Meryl Swanson
- Party: Labor
- Namesake: Banjo Paterson
- Electors: 128,005 (2025)
- Area: 948 km^{2} (366.0 sq mi)
- Demographic: Provincial
- Coordinates: 32°24′25″S 151°55′5″E

The Division of Paterson is an Australian electoral division in the state of New South Wales. It is located just north of Newcastle, on the coast of the Tasman Sea. The division is named after federation-era poet and author Banjo Paterson and was originally created in 1949 and abolished in 1984. It was recreated after a redistribution in 1992.

The division is centred on the lower Hunter Valley and the outer suburbs of Greater Newcastle. It includes the city of Maitland and the towns of Kurri Kurri, Nelson Bay, Raymond Terrace and Salamander Bay. It covers most of the Port Stephens, and Maitland local government areas along with a small outer part of the City of Newcastle and parts of the northern end of the City of Cessnock.

== Geography ==
Since 1984, federal electoral division boundaries in Australia have been determined at redistributions by a redistribution committee appointed by the Australian Electoral Commission. Redistributions occur for the boundaries of divisions in a particular state, and they occur every seven years, or sooner if a state's representation entitlement changes or when divisions of a state are malapportioned.

== History ==
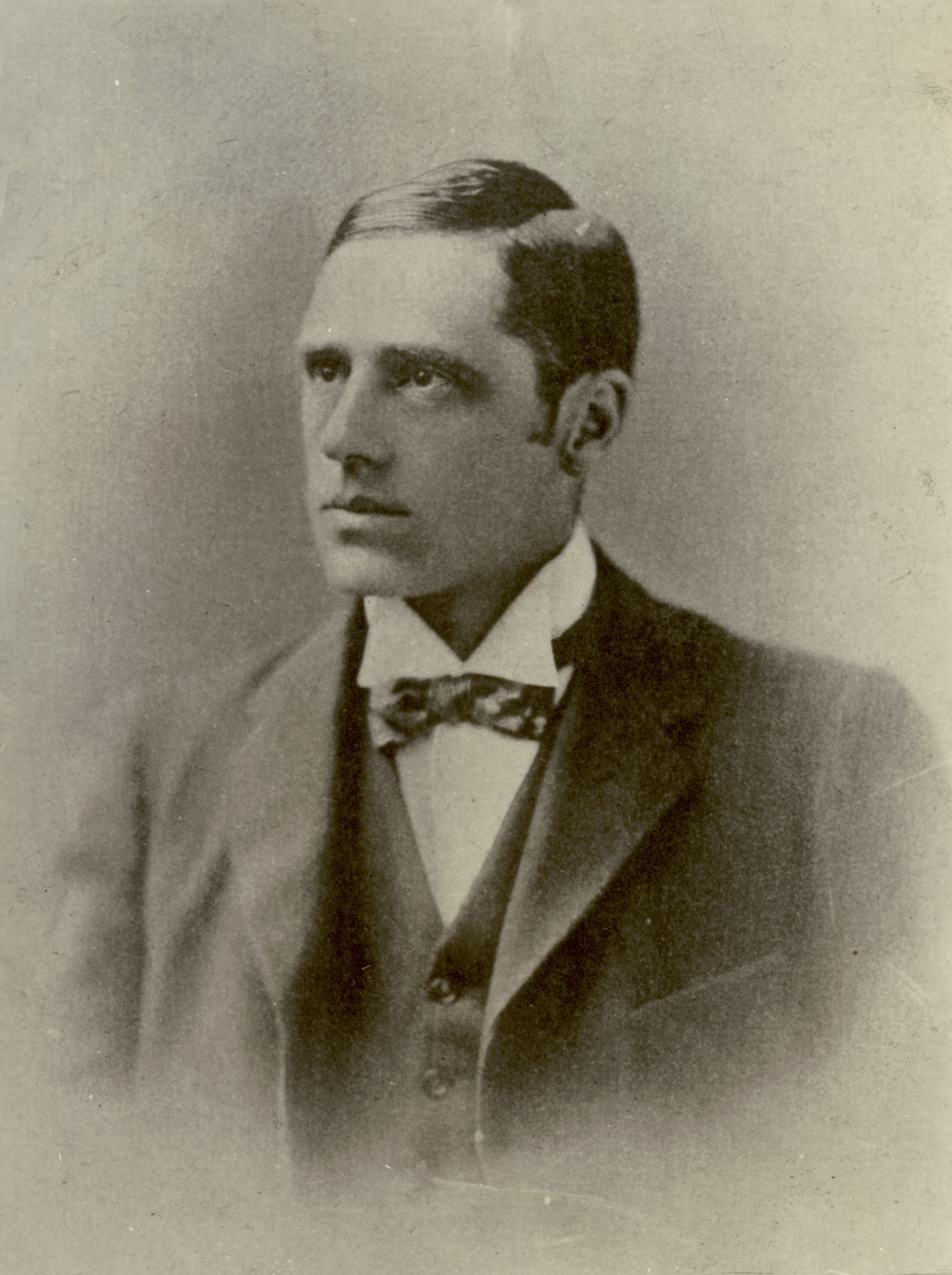
Banjo Paterson, the division's namesake

Paterson was first created at the redistribution of 11 May 1949. It was named after Banjo Paterson although there is conjecture that it was originally named after Colonel William Paterson who also gave his name to the Paterson River and the town of Paterson, both of which were situated within the electorate. It was first contested at the 1949 election. At the time it included the towns of Singleton, Maitland and Muswellbrook. Redistributions eventually moved the electorate north until it included Gunnedah and Mudgee. This incarnation was held by the conservative parties—Liberal and National—for its entire existence, and for most of that time was safely conservative. The original electorate was abolished at the 11 October 1984 redistribution.

At the redistribution of 31 January 1992 the electorate was recreated, covering a similar area to the original electorate. It extended from the lower Hunter Valley in the south to the Manning River in the north, and the Great Dividing Range in the west. It included the towns of Forster, Nelson Bay, Raymond Terrace and Paterson.

It was first contested at the 1993 federal election and was narrowly won by Bob Horne (Labor). After 1993 the seat was continuously exchanged between Horne and Liberal Bob Baldwin; the seat changed hands in 1996, in 1998 and again in 2001. During this period both Bobs became so well known that name recognition in the division was often in excess of 90% in private party polling.

Horne did not contest the seat at the 2004 election at which Baldwin comfortably defeated a new Labor candidate, former Port Stephens councillor Giovanna Kozary, to retain the seat for the first time. At the 2007 election, Baldwin narrowly defeated new Labor candidate Jim Arneman, a Health Services Union organiser. Baldwin faced Arneman again in 2010 election and was reelected on a swing of 4 points, garnering enough votes to win on the first count. At the 2013 election, Baldwin further consolidated his hold on the seat, again winning enough votes to win on the first count. His nearest competitor was Bay Marshall (Labor).

=== 2015 redistribution ===
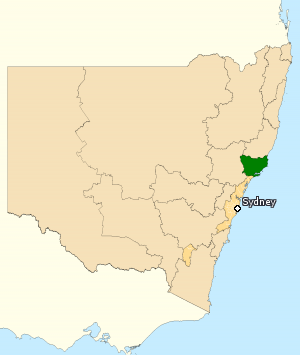
Division of Paterson (green) within New South Wales, prior to the 2015 redistribution

In 2015 the Australian Electoral Commission announced plans to abolish the federation seat of Hunter. Electors in the north of Hunter would have joined the safe National seat of New England. The roughly 40 percent remainder would have become part of Paterson, where the Liberal margin was to be notionally reduced from 9.8 points to 0.5 points as a result.

However, the new map saw Paterson radically reconfigured into a more compact coastal-based seat in the lower Hunter, covering only 1,123 km^{2} (434 sq mi) – only one-sixth of its previous territory. It also absorbed some territory previously in the Labor strongholds of Hunter and Newcastle. The new map completely erased the Liberal majority; on its new boundaries, it had a paper-thin notional Labor majority of 0.3 percent. Baldwin opted not to contest the 2016 election. ABC election analyst Antony Green wrote that even with the knife-edge notional Labor majority, the Liberals would have found it extremely difficult to hold the reconfigured Paterson. Not only had the Liberals lost Baldwin's personal vote, but the Liberals had been late in finding a replacement. The seat was won by the Labor candidate, Meryl Swanson, on a swing of over 10 points, turning it into a safe Labor seat for the first time in its current incarnation.

== Members ==
First incarnation (1949–1984)
Image	Member	Party	Term	Notes
	Allen Fairhall (1909–2006)	Liberal	10 December 1949 – 29 September 1969	Served as minister under Menzies, Holt, McEwen and Gorton. Retired
	Frank O'Keefe (1912–1989)	Country	25 October 1969 – 2 May 1975	Previously held the New South Wales Legislative Assembly seat of Upper Hunter. Retired after Paterson was abolished in 1984
	Frank O'Keefe (1912–1989)	National Country	2 May 1975 – 16 October 1982	Previously held the New South Wales Legislative Assembly seat of Upper Hunter. Retired after Paterson was abolished in 1984
	Frank O'Keefe (1912–1989)	Nationals	16 October 1982 – 26 October 1984	Previously held the New South Wales Legislative Assembly seat of Upper Hunter. Retired after Paterson was abolished in 1984
Second incarnation (1993–present)
Image	Member	Party	Term	Notes
	Bob Horne (1939–)	Labor	13 March 1993 – 2 March 1996	Lost seat
	Bob Baldwin (1955–)	Liberal	2 March 1996 – 3 October 1998	Lost seat
	Bob Horne (1939–)	Labor	3 October 1998 – 10 November 2001	Lost seat
	Bob Baldwin (1955–)	Liberal	10 November 2001 – 9 May 2016	Retired
	Meryl Swanson (1970–)	Labor	2 July 2016 – present	Incumbent

== Election results ==
2025 Australian federal election: Paterson
Party	Candidate	Votes	%	±%
Labor	Meryl Swanson	40,290	37.06	−2.99
Liberal	Laurence Antcliff	29,602	27.23	−10.34
Independent	Philip Penfold	10,565	9.72	+9.72
One Nation	Arnon Wither	8,254	7.59	−0.29
Greens	Paul Johns	8,219	7.56	−0.11
Legalise Cannabis	Daniel Dryden	4,223	3.88	+3.88
Trumpet of Patriots	Peter N. Arena	2,766	2.54	+2.54
Family First	Sandra Briggs	2,205	2.03	+2.03
Independent	Rod Holding	1,360	1.25	+1.25
Independent	April Maree Scott	1,220	1.12	+1.12
Total formal votes		108,704	91.61	−3.41
Informal votes		9,957	8.39	+3.41
Turnout		118,661	92.76	+4.39
Two-party-preferred result
Labor	Meryl Swanson	61,841	56.89	+4.29
Liberal	Laurence Antcliff	46,863	43.11	−4.29
Labor hold		Swing	+4.29	
