= Peter Knott =

Australian politician

Member of the Australian Parliament for Gilmore
- In office 13 March 1993 – 2 March 1996
- Preceded by: John Sharp
- Succeeded by: Joanna Gash

Personal details
- Born: 8 August 1956 Sydney, New South Wales
- Died: 29 October 2015 (aged 59) Laurieton, New South Wales
- Party: Australian Labor Party
- Parent: Bill Knott (father)
- Education: University of Wollongong
- Occupation: Teacher

Peter John Knott (8 August 1956 – 29 October 2015) was an Australian politician, elected as a member of the Australian House of Representatives. He represented Gilmore from 1993 to 1996 for the Australian Labor Party (ALP).

Knott was a librarian and teacher before entering Parliament. His father was New South Wales Labor MP Bill Knott, who represented the seats of Wollondilly and Kiama in state parliament from 1978 to 1986.

Knott was considered an eccentric character by his colleagues and the media, with a number of colourful stories to his name. During the 1993 election campaign, he was asked to organise a visit to a local bakery for prime minister Paul Keating, so that Keating could capitalise on confusion over opposition leader John Hewson's proposed goods and services tax, exemplified by Hewson's own garbled explanation during the birthday cake interview. When they arrived at the bakery, the owner proceeded to loudly harangue the prime minister over payroll tax (a state tax) in front of the media, causing Keating to leave in embarrassment.

Knott was defeated at the 1996 election, but contested the 2001 election for the ALP. In the 2001 campaign, he caused controversy by suggesting that the 11 September 2001 attacks were a result of United States foreign policy. He later withdrew this comment. Nevertheless, there was an 11-point swing against the ALP at the election—the largest swing to the Liberal Party in 2001.

Knott died in late 2015, aged 59.

Parliament of Australia
Preceded by John Sharp	Member for Gilmore; 1993–1996	Succeeded by Joanna Gash
