= John Sharp (Australian politician) =

Australian politician (born 1954)

The Honourable John Sharp AM

Minister for Transport and Regional Development
- In office 11 March 1996 – 25 September 1997
- Prime Minister: John Howard
- Preceded by: Laurie Brereton (Transport); Brian Howe (Regional Development)
- Succeeded by: Mark Vaile

Member of the Australian Parliament for Gilmore
- In office 1 December 1984 – 13 March 1993
- Preceded by: New seat
- Succeeded by: Peter Knott

Member of the Australian Parliament for Hume
- In office 13 March 1993 – 31 August 1998
- Preceded by: Wal Fife
- Succeeded by: Alby Schultz

Personal details
- Born: 15 December 1954 (age 71) Sydney
- Party: National Party of Australia
- Occupation: Farmer

John Randall Sharp AM (born 15 December 1954) is an Australian former politician who served as a National Party member of the Australian House of Representatives representing the Division of Gilmore from 1984 to 1993; and the Division of Hume from 1993 to 1998. Both Divisions are in New South Wales. Sharp has also served as the Minister for Transport and Regional Development between 1996 and 1997 in the Howard government.

== Political career ==
In 1985 Sharp was appointed Chairman of the Coalition Task Force on Drugs. From 1987 he held the following Shadow Portfolios: Sport, Tourism and Youth Affairs, Transport, and Transport and Waterfront Reform. He was Deputy Leader of the House from 1991 to 1993. In 1996 he became Minister for Transport and Regional Development when the Coalition government under John Howard took office after the 1996 federal election.

In the first ten days of office Sharp re-opened the East West Runway at Sydney's Kingsford Smith Airport (KSA), which had been closed by the previous Keating Government. He then reformed the flight paths for KSA under a noise-sharing policy that resolved the issue of aircraft noise complaints that had led to the creation of the No Aircraft Noise Party, who had run candidates in Sydney electorates in the 1996 Federal election. Sharp was responsible for the privatisation of Australia's capital city airports (with the exception of Sydney Airport, which was sold after the 2000 Olympic Games), raising more than $12 billion. He privatised the Commonwealth-owned Australian National Rail in 1997. In 1996 he started the privatisation of the National Rail Corporation (NRC), a Commonwealth, Victorian and NSW government owned rail operator. In 1997 he created the Australian Rail Track Corporation, to overcome the historic and different rail regulatory and access regimes imposed by state governments. Sharp reformed the Australian National Shipping Line (ANL) which was then privatised. In 1996 he initiated a complete rewrite of the Civil Aviation Safety Authority's regulations. During 1996 and 1997, in conjunction with Peter Reith, Minister for Industrial Relations, he was tasked to develop a plan to reform Australia's waterfront. Sharp initiated a National Drivers License Scheme, linking all Australian drivers licenses in each state. In 1996 Sharp created the Roads of National Importance program (RONI) enabling the Commonwealth to fund the upgrade of roads that were not part of the National Highway System, such as the Kidman Way and the Pacific Highway.

=== Controversy ===
Sharp resigned from the ministry on 24 September 1997 after becoming involved in the parliamentary travel allowances affair. The "Travel Rorts Affair" – which also claimed the ministerial careers of Peter McGauran and David Jull – when an audit of parliamentary expense claims revealed that a number of MPs had submitted incorrect travel claims. Sharp said he “depended on memory to a great extent” in preparing the claims, and the audit found he had certified claims when he could not be certain they were accurate. He retired from Parliament on 31 August 1998, prior to the 1998 election.

== Later career ==
After retiring from politics, Sharp worked for the Linfox Group (1999 to 2001). He also founded a transport consultancy company, Thenford Consulting. In 2000 he helped establish European Aeronautic Defence and Space (EADS) in Australia. This company later became known as the Airbus Group. He became a director of Eurocopter International Pacific, a director of Australian Aerospace and then a director of Airbus Group Australia Pacific, from which he retired in 2015. In 2005 Sharp became deputy chairman of Regional Express Airlines. Later he became Chairman of Pel-Air. He continues in those roles today. Sharp was Chairman of Parsons Brinkerhoff Advisory Board for a period of six years, retiring in 2010. He was also Chairman of the Aviation Safety Foundation of Australasia, later renamed Flight Safety International, for seven years from 2003 to 2010. He was the first Australian awarded a Presidential Citation for Aviation Safety. in 2005 he became a director of Skytraders, a specialist aviation company, retiring as a director in 2013. From 2004 to 2015 he was Chairman of Power and Data Corporation.In 2018 Sharp became a director of Luerssen Australia and the Australian Maritime Shipbuilding Export Group.

In 2000 Sharp became the Honorary Federal Treasurer of the National Party of Australia until 2017. He has been a director of John McEwen House since 1999. In 2009 at the Federal Nationals Annual Conference he was presented with the Earle Page Award, the Party's highest honour. From 2002 to 2009 Sharp was a director and then Chairman of the Winifred West Schools Foundation. He was appointed as director of the Tudor House Foundation in 2009. Sharp was Co-Convenor of the Southern Highlands Cancer Council from 2005 to 2009. He established, with Michele Scamps, the Relay for Life in the Southern Highlands of NSW and was Co-Convenor for two of the relays. He is Patron of the JB Sharp Cup Regatta Series, which was founded by his great-grandfather in 1924. The Series conducts rowing regattas during the winter months in Sydney. It is open to all rowers and has been the breeding ground of many famous Australian oarsmen. Sharp was elected a director of the France-Australia Chamber of Commerce and Industry, from 2004 to 2009. In 2019 Sharp was made a director of the Foundation for Rural and Regional Renal (FRRR), a not-for-profit organization whose purpose is to ensure the long term vitality of rural and remote Australia. Also in 2022 Sharp was appointed as a director of the Bundanon Trust, which is the legacy of Arthur Boyd, one of Australia's greatest artists.

In 2015 Sharp was appointed to the Climate Change Authority. In 2016 he was appointed to the Northern Australia Transport Study.

Sharp is a fixed-wing and rotary-wing pilot.

In 2014 it was revealed in the ABC programme A Country Road: The Nationals that sometime before the 1998 Federal election, Sharp had met with then National Party leader Tim Fischer and his deputy John Anderson for a luncheon and they were surprised to learn from each other that they all intended to retire at the forthcoming election. They did not think it was a good idea for all of them to retire at the same time as it did not give a positive image to the party, which is battling against perceptions that it does not have a certain future. In the end, only Sharp retired, with Fischer and Anderson delaying their own retirements by successfully recontesting the election.

Political offices
Preceded by Laurie Brereton (Transport); Brian Howe (Regional Development)	Minister for Transport and Regional Development; 1996–1997	Succeeded by Mark Vaile
Parliament of Australia
New division	Member for Gilmore; 1984–1993	Succeeded by Peter Knott
Preceded by Wal Fife	Member for Hume; 1993–98	Succeeded by Alby Schultz
