= Bob Horne =

Australian politician

Member of the Australian Parliament for Paterson
- In office 13 March 1993 – 2 March 1996
- Preceded by: New seat
- Succeeded by: Bob Baldwin
- In office 3 October 1998 – 10 November 2001
- Preceded by: Bob Baldwin
- Succeeded by: Bob Baldwin

Personal details
- Born: 18 December 1939 (age 86) Newcastle, New South Wales
- Party: Australian Labor Party
- Children: Melissa Horne
- Occupation: Teacher

Robert Hodges Horne (born 18 December 1939) is a former Australian politician. Born in Newcastle, New South Wales, he attended the University of Newcastle before becoming a teacher. He served on Dungog Shire Council from 1987 to 1990 and Port Stephens Council from 1991 to 1993. In 1993 he was elected to the Australian House of Representatives as the Labor member for Paterson. He was defeated in 1996 by Liberal candidate Bob Baldwin, but defeated Baldwin in 1998. After his defeat by Baldwin in 2001, Horne retired from politics.

Parliament of Australia
Preceded by New seat	Member for Paterson; 1993–1996	Succeeded by Bob Baldwin
Preceded by Bob Baldwin	Member for Paterson; 1998–2001	Succeeded by Bob Baldwin
