= Joanna Gash =

Australian politician

Joanna Gash AM

Mayor of Shoalhaven
- In office 8 September 2012 – 17 September 2016
- Preceded by: Paul Green
- Succeeded by: Amanda Findley

Member of the Australian Parliament for Gilmore
- In office 2 March 1996 – 5 August 2013
- Preceded by: Peter Knott
- Succeeded by: Ann Sudmalis

Personal details
- Born: 21 July 1944 (age 82) Groningen, Netherlands
- Party: Liberal; Nationals (2019–)
- Awards: Order of Australia

Joanna Gash AM (born 21 July 1944) is an Australian former politician who served as a member of the House of Representatives representing the Division of Gilmore for the Liberal Party from 1996 to 2013.

In 2012, Gash was directly elected as Mayor of Shoalhaven in the south-eastern coastal region of New South Wales. In 2016, she lost the mayoralty to Greens candidate Amanda Findley.

== Personal life ==
Gash was born in Groningen in the Netherlands, and emigrated to Australia when she was six. She was educated at Institute of Administration in Sydney. Before entering politics she was a Regional Manager with the Tourism Commission of New South Wales, a guest house co-proprietor, and a Councillor of the Wingecarribee Shire Council. She was for many years a scripture and Sunday School teacher and spent many weekends at the Church of England Camps at the Port Hacking River (Camp Howard).

== Political career ==
Gash was elected to Federal Parliament at the 1996 federal election. In January 2012, she announced that she would not be contesting the next federal election. At the same time, she announced her intention to stand for the mayoral position at the Shoalhaven City Council elections, due to be held in September 2012. Gash was successful, winning the directly elected role with 63.19% of the vote. She also led a ticket that saw nine other Councillors elected to the thirteen–member Shoalhaven City Council. Following her election as mayor, there was criticism about her constitutional ability to hold office as a federal Member of Parliament and to hold an office of profit under the crown, as Mayor. Gash vigorously defended her position.

She sought re-election as mayor of City of Shoalhaven at the 2016 NSW Local Council Elections, but lost her position following a massive swing, which saw her lose about half of the vote she won at the 2012 election. Amanda Findley of the Australian Greens was elected as mayor, with Gash being elected as a Ward 2 councillor.

In the 2019 federal election contest for the seat of Gilmore, which she formerly represented, Gash, together with her successor Ann Sudmalis, endorsed the National Party candidate Katrina Hodgkinson over the Prime Minister Scott Morrison's "captain's pick" candidate for the Liberal Party, Warren Mundine. The seat was the only one gained by the Labor Party in the election.

== Honours and awards ==
In 2017, Gash was appointed a member of the Order of Australia for significant service to the Parliament of Australia, to local government, and to the community of the Shoalhaven.

Parliament of Australia
Preceded by Peter Knott	Member for Gilmore; 1996–2013	Succeeded by Ann Sudmalis
