= Bob Baldwin (politician) =

Australian politician

The Honourable Bob Baldwin
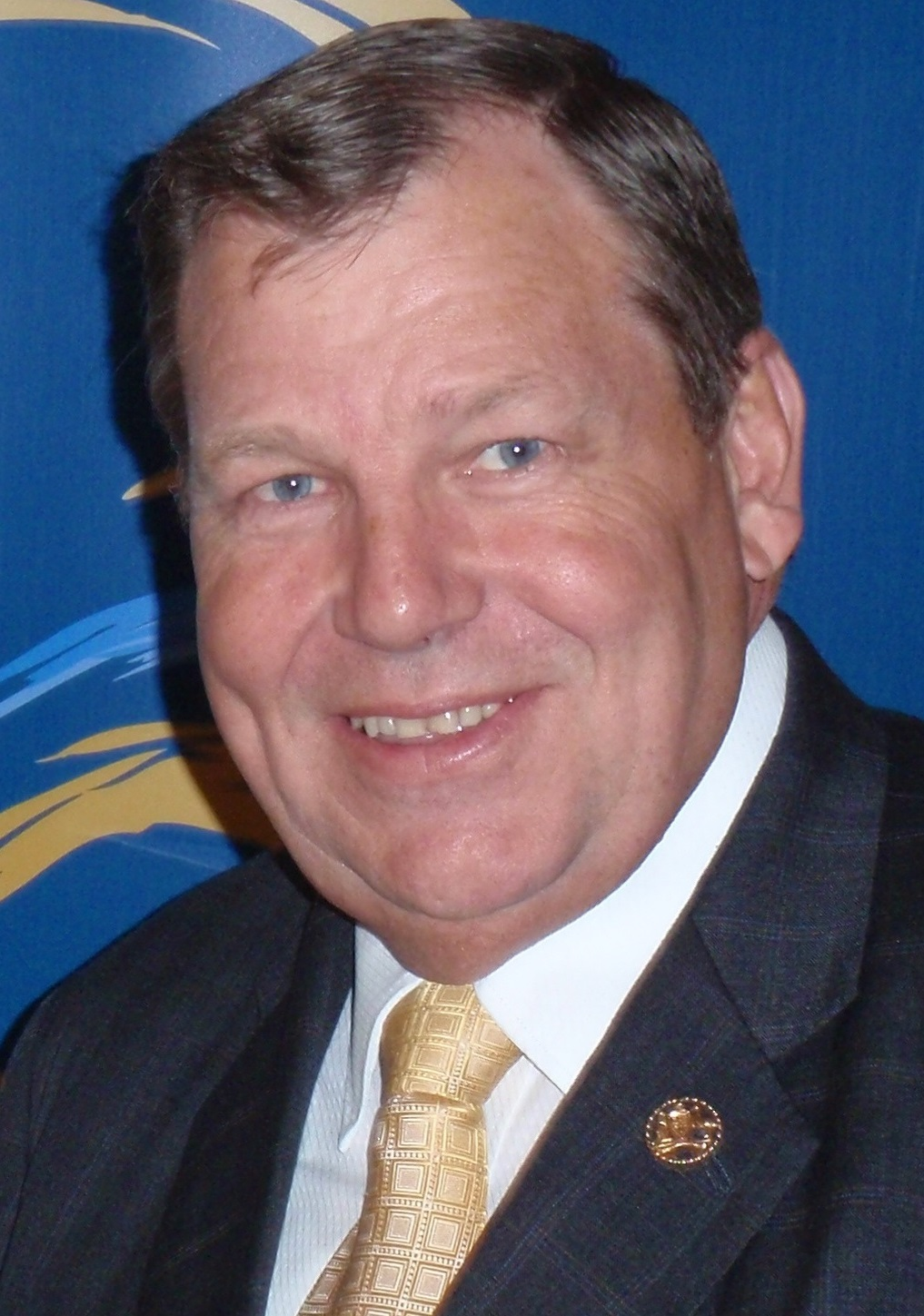
- Baldwin in 2010

Member of the Australian Parliament for Paterson
- In office 10 November 2001 – 9 May 2016
- Preceded by: Bob Horne
- Succeeded by: Meryl Swanson
- In office 2 March 1996 – 3 October 1998
- Preceded by: Bob Horne
- Succeeded by: Bob Horne

Personal details
- Born: Robert Charles Baldwin; 9 March 1955 (age 71) Gloucester, England
- Party: Liberal Party of Australia
- Spouse: Cynthia
- Children: 3
- Occupation: Politician
- Profession: Company director

Robert Charles Baldwin (born 9 March 1955) is a former Australian politician who was a member of the Australian House of Representatives for Paterson in New South Wales from March 1996 to October 1998 and again from November 2001 until May 2016, representing the Liberal Party. Baldwin served in the Abbott Ministry as a Parliamentary Secretary to the Minister for Industry from September 2013 to December 2014; and as a Parliamentary Secretary to the Minister for the Environment from December 2014 to September 2015.

== Background and early years ==
Baldwin was born in Gloucester, England. At the age of three, he moved with his family to Australia, arriving at the Villawood migrant camp in Sydney. His family were not well off, with Baldwin in his final parliamentary speech reflecting on the fact "I would have been happy to sit on a fruit box with a clipboard as my desk, such is the honour to be the 889th person ever elected to the House of Representatives in just on 95 years." Baldwin was a company director before entering politics. He gained Australian citizenship as a child, and renounced his British citizenship prior to standing for Parliament.

== Political career ==
He held the position of Parliamentary Secretary to the Minister for Industry, Tourism & Resources from January 2006 until December 2007 when the Australian Labor Party was elected to govern Australia. After the election, on 6 December 2007 Opposition Leader Brendan Nelson announced that Baldwin would be the new Shadow Minister for Defence Science, Personnel and Assisting Shadow Minister for Defence. On 16 April 2008 he represented the Federal Opposition leader, Brendan Nelson at the commemoration service for HMAS Sydney and HSK Kormoran personnel who lost their lives on 19 November 1941.

After Malcolm Turnbull became leader, he remained in his job. When the 2009 Liberal Party of Australia leadership election was held and Tony Abbott replaced Turnbull he kept his roles. On 14 September 2010 after the 2010 federal election he was promoted to Shadow Minister for Regional Development and Shadow Minister for Tourism.

Baldwin was appointed as Parliamentary Secretary to the Minister for Industry in the Abbott Ministry on 18 September 2013; and appointed as the Parliamentary Secretary to the Minister for the Environment on 23 December 2014. He was not appointed to a position in the First Turnbull Ministry from September 2015.

On 16 April 2016, Baldwin announced he would be retiring from politics and would not contest the 2016 federal election. This came after a redistribution erased his majority in Paterson. He had previously enjoyed a majority of nine percent, but the reconfigured Paterson had a notional thin Labor majority of 0.3 percent. Labor went on to take the seat on a large swing.

Parliament of Australia
Preceded by Bob Horne; Bob Horne	Member for Paterson; 2001–2016; 1996–1998	Succeeded by Meryl Swanson; Bob Horne
