= Electoral results for the Division of Newcastle =

Australian division election results

This is a list of electoral results for the Division of Newcastle in Australian federal elections from the electorate's creation in 1901 until the present.

== Members ==
| Member | Party | Term |
|---|---|---|
| David Watkins | Labor | 1901–1935 |
| David Oliver Watkins | Labor | 1935 by–1958 |
| Charles Jones | Labor | 1958–1983 |
| Allan Morris | Labor | 1983–2001 |
| Sharon Grierson | Labor | 2001–2013 |
| Sharon Claydon | Labor | 2013–present |

== Election results ==
=== Elections in the 2020s ===
==== 2025 ====
2025 Australian federal election: Newcastle
| Party | Candidate | Votes | % | ±% |
|---|---|---|---|---|
| Labor | Sharon Claydon | 49,054 | 45.31 | +1.25 |
| Greens | Charlotte McCabe | 24,061 | 22.22 | +2.21 |
| Liberal | Asarri McPhee | 20,638 | 19.06 | −5.23 |
| One Nation | Phillip Heyne | 5,789 | 5.35 | +0.83 |
| Trumpet of Patriots | Jennifer Stefanac | 3,861 | 3.57 | +2.53 |
| Family First | Jason Briggs | 2,319 | 2.14 | +2.14 |
| Socialist Alliance | Steve O'Brien | 1,656 | 1.53 | +1.53 |
| | Robert Creech | 888 | 0.82 | +0.82 |
| Total formal votes | | 108,266 | 93.00 | −1.57 |
| Informal votes | | 8,145 | 7.00 | +1.57 |
| Turnout | | 116,411 | 92.22 | +1.52 |
Notional two-party-preferred count
| Labor | Sharon Claydon | 76,644 | 70.79 | +2.85 |
| Liberal | Asarri McPhee | 31,622 | 29.21 | −2.85 |
Two-candidate-preferred result
| Labor | Sharon Claydon | 71,244 | 65.80 | −2.14 |
| Greens | Charlotte McCabe | 37,022 | 34.20 | +34.20 |
| Labor hold | | Swing | –2.14 | |

==== 2022 ====
2022 Australian federal election: Newcastle
| Party | Candidate | Votes | % | ±% |
|---|---|---|---|---|
| Labor | Sharon Claydon | 46,551 | 44.07 | −1.66 |
| Liberal | Katrina Wark | 25,816 | 24.44 | −4.77 |
| Greens | Charlotte McCabe | 21,195 | 20.07 | +4.51 |
| One Nation | Mark Watson | 4,757 | 4.50 | +4.50 |
| Animal Justice | Emily Brollo | 2,549 | 2.41 | −0.79 |
| United Australia | Amanda Cook | 2,517 | 2.38 | −0.99 |
| Informed Medical Options | William Hussey | 1,140 | 1.08 | +1.08 |
| Federation | Garth Pywell | 1,102 | 1.04 | +1.04 |
| Total formal votes | | 105,627 | 94.59 | +0.10 |
| Informal votes | | 6,038 | 5.41 | −0.10 |
| Turnout | | 111,665 | 91.19 | −1.53 |
Two-party-preferred result
| Labor | Sharon Claydon | 71,807 | 67.98 | +4.15 |
| Liberal | Katrina Wark | 33,820 | 32.02 | −4.15 |
| Labor hold | | Swing | +4.15 | |

Alluvial diagram for preference flows in the seat of Newcastle in the 2022 federal election. indicates at what stage the winning candidate had over 50% of the votes and was declared the winner.

=== Elections in the 2010s ===
==== 2019 ====
2019 Australian federal election: Newcastle
| Party | Candidate | Votes | % | ±% |
|---|---|---|---|---|
| Labor | Sharon Claydon | 47,137 | 45.73 | −1.39 |
| Liberal | Katrina Wark | 30,107 | 29.21 | −0.71 |
| Greens | John Mackenzie | 16,038 | 15.56 | +1.90 |
| United Australia | Geoffrey Scully | 3,471 | 3.37 | +3.37 |
| Animal Justice | Darren Brollo | 3,300 | 3.20 | +3.20 |
| Christian Democrats | Pam Wise | 1,928 | 1.87 | −0.28 |
| Great Australian | Barry Futter | 1,086 | 1.05 | +1.05 |
| Total formal votes | | 103,067 | 94.49 | −0.77 |
| Informal votes | | 6,014 | 5.51 | +0.77 |
| Turnout | | 109,081 | 92.72 | +0.80 |
Two-party-preferred result
| Labor | Sharon Claydon | 65,784 | 63.83 | −0.01 |
| Liberal | Katrina Wark | 37,283 | 36.17 | +0.01 |
| Labor hold | | Swing | −0.01 | |

==== 2016 ====
2016 Australian federal election: Newcastle
| Party | Candidate | Votes | % | ±% |
|---|---|---|---|---|
| Labor | Sharon Claydon | 46,762 | 47.12 | +2.83 |
| Liberal | David Compton | 29,689 | 29.92 | −3.26 |
| Greens | John Mackenzie | 13,558 | 13.66 | +2.06 |
| Drug Law Reform | Karen Burge | 3,391 | 3.42 | +3.42 |
| Independent | Rod Holding | 2,735 | 2.76 | +2.17 |
| Christian Democrats | Milton Caine | 2,132 | 2.15 | +0.43 |
| Democratic Labour | Stuart Southwell | 968 | 0.98 | +0.98 |
| Total formal votes | | 99,235 | 95.26 | +1.56 |
| Informal votes | | 4,939 | 4.74 | −1.56 |
| Turnout | | 104,174 | 91.92 | −2.35 |
Two-party-preferred result
| Labor | Sharon Claydon | 63,348 | 63.84 | +4.44 |
| Liberal | David Compton | 35,887 | 36.16 | −4.44 |
| Labor hold | | Swing | +4.44 | |

==== 2013 ====
2013 Australian federal election: Newcastle
| Party | Candidate | Votes | % | ±% |
|---|---|---|---|---|
| Labor | Sharon Claydon | 37,391 | 43.73 | −4.16 |
| Liberal | Jaimie Abbott | 29,632 | 34.66 | +3.33 |
| Greens | Michael Osborne | 10,258 | 12.00 | −3.47 |
| Palmer United | Yegon McLellan | 3,518 | 4.11 | +4.11 |
| Christian Democrats | Milton Caine | 1,091 | 1.28 | −0.52 |
| Progressive Labour | Susanna Scurry | 1,026 | 1.20 | +1.20 |
| Australia First | Michael Chehoff | 922 | 1.08 | +1.08 |
| Independent | Rod Holding | 674 | 0.79 | +0.79 |
| Socialist Alliance | Zane Alcorn | 616 | 0.72 | −0.29 |
| Australian Independents | Lawrence Higgins | 367 | 0.43 | +0.43 |
| Total formal votes | | 85,495 | 93.80 | −0.51 |
| Informal votes | | 5,653 | 6.20 | +0.51 |
| Turnout | | 91,148 | 93.60 | 0.00 |
Two-party-preferred result
| Labor | Sharon Claydon | 50,298 | 58.83 | −3.66 |
| Liberal | Jaimie Abbott | 35,197 | 41.17 | +3.66 |
| Labor hold | | Swing | −3.66 | |

==== 2010 ====
2010 Australian federal election: Newcastle
| Party | Candidate | Votes | % | ±% |
|---|---|---|---|---|
| Labor | Sharon Grierson | 39,253 | 47.89 | −2.88 |
| Liberal | Brad Luke | 25,680 | 31.33 | +5.77 |
| Greens | Michael Osborne | 12,677 | 15.47 | +5.45 |
| Christian Democrats | Milton Caine | 1,479 | 1.80 | +0.54 |
| Democrats | Dean Winter | 1,419 | 1.73 | +0.68 |
| Socialist Alliance | Zane Alcorn | 829 | 1.01 | +0.62 |
| Socialist Equality | Noel Holt | 627 | 0.76 | +0.43 |
| Total formal votes | | 81,964 | 94.31 | −1.26 |
| Informal votes | | 4,948 | 5.69 | +1.26 |
| Turnout | | 86,912 | 93.56 | −1.69 |
Two-party-preferred result
| Labor | Sharon Grierson | 51,220 | 62.49 | −3.42 |
| Liberal | Brad Luke | 30,744 | 37.51 | +3.42 |
| Labor hold | | Swing | −3.42 | |

=== Elections in the 2000s ===
==== 2007 ====
2007 Australian federal election: Newcastle
| Party | Candidate | Votes | % | ±% |
|---|---|---|---|---|
| Labor | Sharon Grierson | 42,936 | 50.78 | +5.21 |
| Liberal | Krysia Walker | 21,611 | 25.56 | −10.71 |
| Greens | Charmian Eckersley | 8,463 | 10.01 | −1.30 |
| Independent | Aaron Buman | 6,343 | 7.50 | +7.50 |
| Family First | Malcolm East | 1,926 | 2.28 | +2.12 |
| Christian Democrats | Milton Caine | 1,064 | 1.26 | +1.26 |
| Democrats | Aaron Johnson | 891 | 1.05 | −1.25 |
| Independent | Joel Curry | 701 | 0.83 | +0.83 |
| Socialist Alliance | Geoff Payne | 333 | 0.39 | −0.14 |
| Socialist Equality | Noel Holt | 277 | 0.33 | +0.33 |
| Total formal votes | | 84,545 | 95.56 | +0.75 |
| Informal votes | | 3,930 | 4.44 | −0.75 |
| Turnout | | 88,475 | 94.67 | −0.82 |
Two-party-preferred result
| Labor | Sharon Grierson | 55,725 | 65.91 | +6.82 |
| Liberal | Krysia Walker | 28,820 | 34.09 | −6.82 |
| Labor hold | | Swing | +6.82 | |

==== 2004 ====
2004 Australian federal election: Newcastle
| Party | Candidate | Votes | % | ±% |
|---|---|---|---|---|
| Labor | Sharon Grierson | 37,392 | 45.98 | +5.03 |
| Liberal | Josephine Barfield | 28,902 | 35.54 | +5.17 |
| Greens | Annie Rooke-Frizell | 9,701 | 11.93 | +4.41 |
| Democrats | Eddie Smith | 2,018 | 2.48 | −3.27 |
| Progressive Labour | Harry Williams | 2,001 | 2.46 | −2.65 |
| Citizens Electoral Council | Don Bower | 813 | 1.00 | +1.00 |
| Socialist Alliance | Peter Robson | 491 | 0.60 | +0.60 |
| Total formal votes | | 81,318 | 95.01 | −0.19 |
| Informal votes | | 4,271 | 4.99 | +0.19 |
| Turnout | | 85,589 | 94.72 | +0.45 |
Two-party-preferred result
| Labor | Sharon Grierson | 48,771 | 59.98 | +3.07 |
| Liberal | Josephine Barfield | 32,547 | 40.02 | −3.07 |
| Labor hold | | Swing | +3.07 | |

==== 2001 ====
2001 Australian federal election: Newcastle
| Party | Candidate | Votes | % | ±% |
|---|---|---|---|---|
| Labor | Sharon Grierson | 32,790 | 40.95 | −8.12 |
| Liberal | David M Williams | 24,312 | 30.37 | +27.56 |
| Greens | John Sutton | 6,022 | 7.52 | −0.95 |
| One Nation | Barrie Lawn | 4,753 | 5.94 | −9.52 |
| Democrats | Mary Kavanagh | 4,601 | 5.75 | −2.31 |
| Progressive Labour | Harry Williams | 4,093 | 5.11 | +3.59 |
| Independent | Harry Criticos | 1,899 | 2.37 | −1.29 |
| Christian Democrats | Elaine Battersby | 1,238 | 1.55 | −1.14 |
| | Erin Killion-DelCastillo | 354 | 0.44 | +0.44 |
| Total formal votes | | 80,052 | 95.20 | −0.12 |
| Informal votes | | 4,037 | 4.80 | +0.12 |
| Turnout | | 84,089 | 94.61 | |
Two-party-preferred result
| Labor | Sharon Grierson | 45,555 | 56.91 | −10.42 |
| Liberal | David M Williams | 34,497 | 43.09 | +43.09 |
| Labor hold | | Swing | −10.42 | |

=== Elections in the 1990s ===
==== 1998 ====
1998 Newcastle supplementary election
| Party | Candidate | Votes | % | ±% |
|---|---|---|---|---|
| Labor | Allan Morris | 31,441 | 48.21 | −1.94 |
| One Nation | Kate Taylor | 10,466 | 16.05 | +16.05 |
| Greens | Carrie Jacobi | 5,965 | 9.15 | +0.42 |
| Democrats | Stephen Bisgrove | 5,607 | 8.60 | −1.29 |
| Independent | Ivan Welsh | 4,398 | 6.74 | +6.74 |
| Independent | Harry Criticos | 2,718 | 4.17 | +4.17 |
| Christian Democrats | Greg Budworth | 1,798 | 2.76 | +2.76 |
| Progressive Labour | Harry Williams | 1,131 | 1.73 | +1.73 |
| Independent | Peter Boyd | 757 | 1.16 | +1.16 |
| Democratic Socialist | Geoff Payne | 662 | 1.01 | +1.01 |
| Citizens Electoral Council | Tony King | 280 | 0.43 | +0.43 |
| Total formal votes | | 65,223 | 95.12 | −2.04 |
| Informal votes | | 3,347 | 4.88 | +2.04 |
| Turnout | | 68,570 | 88.37 | −8.40 |
Two-candidate-preferred result
| Labor | Allan Morris | 43,917 | 67.33 | +6.14 |
| Greens | Carrie Jacobi | 21,306 | 32.67 | +32.67 |
| Labor hold | | Swing | +6.14 | |

==== 1996 ====
1996 Australian federal election: Newcastle
| Party | Candidate | Votes | % | ±% |
|---|---|---|---|---|
| Labor | Allan Morris | 36,146 | 50.14 | −6.53 |
| Liberal | Ivan Welsh | 21,938 | 30.43 | +2.93 |
| Democrats | Barry Boettcher | 7,126 | 9.89 | +6.99 |
| Greens | Cathy Burgess | 6,288 | 8.72 | +1.38 |
| | Kamala Emanuel | 591 | 0.82 | +0.82 |
| Total formal votes | | 72,089 | 97.16 | +0.11 |
| Informal votes | | 2,105 | 2.84 | −0.11 |
| Turnout | | 74,194 | 96.77 | +0.31 |
Two-party-preferred result
| Labor | Allan Morris | 43,807 | 61.19 | −5.69 |
| Liberal | Ivan Welsh | 27,780 | 38.81 | +5.69 |
| Labor hold | | Swing | −5.69 | |

==== 1993 ====
1993 Australian federal election: Newcastle
| Party | Candidate | Votes | % | ±% |
|---|---|---|---|---|
| Labor | Allan Morris | 41,268 | 56.67 | +4.82 |
| Liberal | Glenn Turner | 20,030 | 27.51 | +8.48 |
| Greens | James Whelan | 5,349 | 7.35 | +7.35 |
| Independent | Ivan Welsh | 2,658 | 3.65 | +3.65 |
| Democrats | Greg Baines | 2,109 | 2.90 | −8.92 |
| Call to Australia | Jim Kendall | 762 | 1.05 | +1.05 |
| | Lewina Jackson | 354 | 0.49 | +0.49 |
| Independent | Frank Blefari | 292 | 0.40 | +0.40 |
| Total formal votes | | 72,822 | 97.05 | −0.35 |
| Informal votes | | 2,212 | 2.95 | +0.35 |
| Turnout | | 75,034 | 96.46 | |
Two-party-preferred result
| Labor | Allan Morris | 48,683 | 66.88 | +4.08 |
| Liberal | Glenn Turner | 24,107 | 33.12 | +33.12 |
| Labor hold | | Swing | +4.08 | |

==== 1990 ====
1990 Australian federal election: Newcastle
| Party | Candidate | Votes | % | ±% |
|---|---|---|---|---|
| Labor | Allan Morris | 33,650 | 53.7 | +2.2 |
| Independent | Leigh Maughan | 11,108 | 17.7 | +17.7 |
| Liberal | Mark Hallett | | 14.8 | −1.7 |
| Democrats | Malcolm Martin | 7,273 | 11.6 | +6.7 |
| Independent | Frank Blefari | 972 | 1.6 | +1.6 |
| Independent | Con Forster | 352 | 0.6 | +0.6 |
| Total formal votes | | 62,624 | 97.2 | |
| Informal votes | | 1,792 | 2.8 | |
| Turnout | | 64,416 | 96.2 | |
Notional two-party-preferred count
| Labor | Allan Morris | | 69.1 | +5.0 |
| Liberal | Mark Hallett | | 30.9 | −5.0 |
Two-candidate-preferred result
| Labor | Allan Morris | 39,211 | 62.8 | +7.5 |
| Independent | Leigh Maughan | 23,198 | 37.2 | +37.2 |
| Labor hold | | Swing | +7.5 | |

=== Elections in the 1980s ===
==== 1987 ====
1987 Australian federal election: Newcastle
| Party | Candidate | Votes | % | ±% |
|---|---|---|---|---|
| Labor | Allan Morris | 31,095 | 51.5 | −5.2 |
| Independent | George Keegan | 16,362 | 27.1 | +27.1 |
| Liberal | Alan Taggart | 9,978 | 16.5 | −1.7 |
| Democrats | Rae Rendle | 2,948 | 4.9 | −1.1 |
| Total formal votes | | 60,383 | 95.7 | |
| Informal votes | | 2,741 | 4.3 | |
| Turnout | | 63,124 | 95.2 | |
Notional two-party-preferred count
| Labor | Allan Morris | 38,670 | 64.1 | –0.4 |
| Liberal | Alan Taggart | 21,671 | 35.9 | –0.4 |
Two-candidate-preferred result
| Labor | Allan Morris | | 55.3 (Note: Estimate based on a notional distribution of Taggart's votes.) | |
| Independent | George Keegan | | 44.7 | |
| Labor hold | | Swing | −9.2 | |

==== 1984 ====
1984 Australian federal election: Newcastle
| Party | Candidate | Votes | % | ±% |
|---|---|---|---|---|
| Labor | Allan Morris | 33,715 | 56.7 | −6.0 |
| Liberal | Ashley Saunders | 10,840 | 18.2 | −6.0 |
| Independent | Don Geddes | 10,460 | 17.6 | +17.6 |
| Democrats | Steve Jeffries | 3,570 | 6.0 | +1.5 |
| Independent | Jim Campbell | 837 | 1.4 | +1.4 |
| Total formal votes | | 59,422 | 94.1 | |
| Informal votes | | 3,705 | 5.9 | |
| Turnout | | 63,127 | 95.2 | |
Two-party-preferred result
| Labor | Allan Morris | 38,283 | 64.5 | −6.1 |
| Liberal | Ashley Saunders | 21,076 | 35.5 | +6.1 |
| Labor hold | | Swing | −6.1 | |

==== 1983 ====
1983 Australian federal election: Newcastle
| Party | Candidate | Votes | % | ±% |
|---|---|---|---|---|
| Labor | Allan Morris | 39,003 | 59.6 | +1.6 |
| Liberal | Stan Hayward | 17,842 | 27.3 | −7.2 |
| Democrats | Wayne Jarman | 2,951 | 4.5 | +1.3 |
| Independent | Frank Blefari | 2,355 | 3.6 | +3.6 |
| Communist | Darrell Dawson | 1,732 | 2.6 | +0.1 |
| Independent | Brian McDermott | 959 | 1.5 | +1.5 |
| Socialist Workers | Geoffrey Payne | 573 | 0.9 | +1.0 |
| Total formal votes | | 65,415 | 97.3 | |
| Informal votes | | 1,838 | 2.7 | |
| Turnout | | 67,253 | 95.6 | |
Two-party-preferred result
| Labor | Allan Morris | | 67.5 | +3.7 |
| Liberal | Stan Hayward | | 32.5 | −3.7 |
| Labor hold | | Swing | +3.7 | |

==== 1980 ====
1980 Australian federal election: Newcastle
| Party | Candidate | Votes | % | ±% |
|---|---|---|---|---|
| Labor | Charles Jones | 38,321 | 58.0 | +0.7 |
| Liberal | Richard Bevan | 22,823 | 34.5 | +1.1 |
| Democrats | John Cleverly | 2,132 | 3.2 | −2.1 |
| Communist | Darrell Dawson | 1,629 | 2.5 | −1.6 |
| Socialist Workers | Geoffrey Payne | 1,204 | 1.8 | +1.8 |
| Total formal votes | | 66,109 | 97.8 | |
| Informal votes | | 1,504 | 2.2 | |
| Turnout | | 67,613 | 94.9 | |
Two-party-preferred result
| Labor | Charles Jones | | 63.8 | +0.1 |
| Liberal | Richard Bevan | | 36.2 | −0.1 |
| Labor hold | | Swing | +0.1 | |

=== Elections in the 1970s ===
==== 1977 ====
1977 Australian federal election: Newcastle
| Party | Candidate | Votes | % | ±% |
|---|---|---|---|---|
| Labor | Charles Jones | 38,620 | 57.3 | −2.8 |
| Liberal | Elaine Samuels | 22,485 | 33.4 | −4.7 |
| Democrats | Ian Hay | 3,546 | 5.3 | +5.3 |
| Communist | Darrell Dawson | 2,763 | 4.1 | +2.2 |
| Total formal votes | | 67,414 | 97.7 | |
| Informal votes | | 1,606 | 2.3 | |
| Turnout | | 69,020 | 96.6 | |
Two-party-preferred result
| Labor | Charles Jones | | 63.7 | +1.9 |
| Liberal | Elaine Samuels | | 36.3 | −1.9 |
| Labor hold | | Swing | +1.9 | |

==== 1975 ====
1975 Australian federal election: Newcastle
| Party | Candidate | Votes | % | ±% |
|---|---|---|---|---|
| Labor | Charles Jones | 34,170 | 61.9 | −8.1 |
| Liberal | Arthur Thomas | 20,045 | 36.3 | +9.2 |
| Communist | David Ross | 1,027 | 1.9 | +1.9 |
| Total formal votes | | 55,242 | 98.0 | |
| Informal votes | | 1,140 | 2.0 | |
| Turnout | | 56,382 | 96.2 | |
Two-party-preferred result
| Labor | Charles Jones | | 63.6 | −8.1 |
| Liberal | Arthur Thomas | | 36.4 | +8.1 |
| Labor hold | | Swing | −8.1 | |

==== 1974 ====
1974 Australian federal election: Newcastle
| Party | Candidate | Votes | % | ±% |
|---|---|---|---|---|
| Labor | Charles Jones | 38,554 | 70.0 | +5.1 |
| Liberal | Arthur Thomas | 14,947 | 27.1 | −1.4 |
| Australia | Ellen Rose | 1,590 | 2.9 | +2.9 |
| Total formal votes | | 55,091 | 98.4 | |
| Informal votes | | 919 | 1.6 | |
| Turnout | | 56,010 | 96.1 | |
Two-party-preferred result
| Labor | Charles Jones | | 71.7 | +3.7 |
| Liberal | Arthur Thomas | | 28.3 | −3.7 |
| Labor hold | | Swing | +3.7 | |

==== 1972 ====
1972 Australian federal election: Newcastle
| Party | Candidate | Votes | % | ±% |
|---|---|---|---|---|
| Labor | Charles Jones | 33,451 | 64.9 | +2.0 |
| Liberal | Malcolm Blackshaw | 14,683 | 28.5 | −5.7 |
| Communist | Harry Anderson | 1,951 | 3.8 | +3.8 |
| Democratic Labor | Robert Godfrey | 1,441 | 2.8 | +2.8 |
| Total formal votes | | 51,526 | 98.3 | |
| Informal votes | | 880 | 1.7 | |
| Turnout | | 52,406 | 96.2 | |
Two-party-preferred result
| Labor | Charles Jones | | 68.0 | +3.4 |
| Liberal | Malcolm Blackshaw | | 32.0 | −3.4 |
| Labor hold | | Swing | +3.4 | |

=== Elections in the 1960s ===
==== 1969 ====
1969 Australian federal election: Newcastle
| Party | Candidate | Votes | % | ±% |
|---|---|---|---|---|
| Labor | Charles Jones | 32,469 | 62.9 | +7.6 |
| Liberal | Alfred Appleby | 17,662 | 34.2 | −0.7 |
| Australia | Wlodzimierz Bohakto | 1,505 | 2.9 | +2.9 |
| Total formal votes | | 51,636 | 98.1 | |
| Informal votes | | 1,027 | 1.9 | |
| Turnout | | 52,663 | 95.0 | |
Two-party-preferred result
| Labor | Charles Jones | | 64.6 | +6.6 |
| Liberal | Alfred Appleby | | 35.4 | −6.6 |
| Labor hold | | Swing | +6.6 | |

==== 1966 ====
1966 Australian federal election: Newcastle
| Party | Candidate | Votes | % | ±% |
|---|---|---|---|---|
| Labor | Charles Jones | 19,682 | 56.0 | −2.7 |
| Liberal | Frances Clack | 12,000 | 34.2 | −0.1 |
| Democratic Labor | Jack Collins | 2,054 | 5.8 | −1.2 |
| Independent | Warren Bridge | 1,392 | 4.0 | +4.0 |
| Total formal votes | | 35,128 | 96.9 | |
| Informal votes | | 1,136 | 3.1 | |
| Turnout | | 36,264 | 95.6 | |
Two-party-preferred result
| Labor | Charles Jones | | 58.7 | −1.2 |
| Liberal | Frances Clack | | 41.3 | +1.2 |
| Labor hold | | Swing | −1.2 | |

==== 1963 ====
1963 Australian federal election: Newcastle
| Party | Candidate | Votes | % | ±% |
|---|---|---|---|---|
| Labor | Charles Jones | 21,434 | 58.7 | −4.1 |
| Liberal | Eric Cupit | 12,518 | 34.3 | +6.1 |
| Democratic Labor | Jack Collins | 2,559 | 7.0 | −2.0 |
| Total formal votes | | 36,511 | 98.4 | |
| Informal votes | | 597 | 1.6 | |
| Turnout | | 37,108 | 95.9 | |
Two-party-preferred result
| Labor | Charles Jones | | 59.9 | −5.5 |
| Liberal | Eric Cupit | | 40.1 | +5.5 |
| Labor hold | | Swing | +1.9 | |

==== 1961 ====
1961 Australian federal election: Newcastle
| Party | Candidate | Votes | % | ±% |
|---|---|---|---|---|
| Labor | Charles Jones | 23,315 | 62.8 | +2.9 |
| Liberal | Henry Wansey | 10,488 | 28.2 | −1.4 |
| Democratic Labor | Hugh Ansell | 3,330 | 9.0 | +0.7 |
| Total formal votes | | 37,133 | 97.7 | |
| Informal votes | | 878 | 2.3 | |
| Turnout | | 38,011 | 95.6 | |
Two-party-preferred result
| Labor | Charles Jones | | 65.4 | +2.0 |
| Liberal | Henry Wansey | | 34.6 | −2.0 |
| Labor hold | | Swing | +2.0 | |

=== Elections in the 1950s ===
==== 1958 ====
1958 Australian federal election: Newcastle
| Party | Candidate | Votes | % | ±% |
|---|---|---|---|---|
| Labor | Charles Jones | 23,235 | 59.9 | +0.7 |
| Liberal | Alwyn Watkins | 11,486 | 29.6 | −7.7 |
| Democratic Labor | Jack Collins | 3,226 | 8.3 | +8.3 |
| Independent | Mary Pepperall | 676 | 1.7 | +1.7 |
| Independent | Sidney Monroe | 151 | 0.4 | −0.9 |
| Total formal votes | | 38,774 | 97.0 | |
| Informal votes | | 1,198 | 3.0 | |
| Turnout | | 39,972 | 96.1 | |
Two-party-preferred result
| Labor | Charles Jones | | 63.4 | +1.6 |
| Liberal | Alwyn Watkins | | 36.6 | −1.6 |
| Labor hold | | Swing | +1.6 | |

==== 1955 ====
1955 Australian federal election: Newcastle
| Party | Candidate | Votes | % | ±% |
|---|---|---|---|---|
| Labor | David Watkins | 23,801 | 59.2 | −1.0 |
| Liberal | Eric Cupit | 15,017 | 37.3 | +1.5 |
| Communist | Doug Olive | 879 | 2.2 | +0.9 |
| Independent | Sidney Monroe | 522 | 1.3 | −0.1 |
| Total formal votes | | 40,219 | 96.5 | |
| Informal votes | | 1,479 | 3.5 | |
| Turnout | | 41,698 | 95.9 | |
Two-party-preferred result
| Labor | David Watkins | | 61.8 | +0.0 |
| Liberal | Eric Cupit | | 38.2 | +0.0 |
| Labor hold | | Swing | +0.0 | |

==== 1954 ====
1954 Australian federal election: Newcastle
| Party | Candidate | Votes | % | ±% |
|---|---|---|---|---|
| Labor | David Watkins | 20,854 | 57.8 | −2.7 |
| Liberal | Matthew Tapp | 14,011 | 38.8 | +3.6 |
| Communist | Doug Olive | 716 | 2.0 | −2.3 |
| Independent | Sidney Monroe | 490 | 1.4 | +1.4 |
| Total formal votes | | 36,071 | 98.9 | |
| Informal votes | | 384 | 1.1 | |
| Turnout | | 36,445 | 96.8 | |
Two-party-preferred result
| Labor | David Watkins | | 59.8 | −3.6 |
| Liberal | Matthew Tapp | | 40.2 | +3.6 |
| Labor hold | | Swing | −3.6 | |

==== 1951 ====
1951 Australian federal election: Newcastle
| Party | Candidate | Votes | % | ±% |
|---|---|---|---|---|
| Labor | David Watkins | 23,152 | 60.5 | +4.8 |
| Liberal | Roy Stewart | 13,485 | 35.2 | −4.7 |
| Communist | Laurie Aarons | 1,645 | 4.3 | +1.1 |
| Total formal votes | | 38,282 | 98.4 | |
| Informal votes | | 606 | 1.6 | |
| Turnout | | 38,888 | 96.9 | |
Two-party-preferred result
| Labor | David Watkins | | 63.4 | +5.1 |
| Liberal | Roy Stewart | | 36.6 | −5.1 |
| Labor hold | | Swing | +5.1 | |

=== Elections in the 1940s ===
==== 1949 ====
1949 Australian federal election: Newcastle
| Party | Candidate | Votes | % | ±% |
|---|---|---|---|---|
| Labor | David Watkins | 21,705 | 55.7 | −1.4 |
| Liberal | Harry Quinlan | 15,529 | 39.9 | +14.6 |
| Communist | Laurie Aarons | 1,257 | 3.2 | −3.7 |
| Independent | Grahame Bland | 445 | 1.1 | −1.2 |
| Total formal votes | | 38,936 | 98.2 | |
| Informal votes | | 711 | 1.8 | |
| Turnout | | 39,647 | 97.8 | |
Two-party-preferred result
| Labor | David Watkins | | 58.3 | −10.8 |
| Liberal | Harry Quinlan | | 41.7 | +10.8 |
| Labor hold | | Swing | −10.8 | |

==== 1946 ====
1946 Australian federal election: Newcastle
| Party | Candidate | Votes | % | ±% |
|---|---|---|---|---|
| Labor | David Watkins | 38,203 | 58.9 | −10.3 |
| Liberal | Allen Fairhall | 15,124 | 23.3 | +23.3 |
| Communist | Stan Deacon | 4,616 | 7.1 | −4.2 |
| Lang Labor | Charles Dicker | 2,474 | 3.8 | +3.8 |
| Services | Grahame Bland | 1,466 | 2.3 | +2.3 |
| Independent | Edwin Dark | 923 | 1.4 | +1.4 |
| Independent | Frederick Wilson | 723 | 1.1 | +1.1 |
| Independent | Isabel Longworth | 626 | 1.0 | +1.0 |
| Social Credit | Arthur Clarke | 360 | 0.6 | +0.6 |
| Service | Harry Ellis | 336 | 0.5 | +0.5 |
| Total formal votes | | 64,851 | 94.7 | |
| Informal votes | | 3,653 | 5.3 | |
| Turnout | | 68,504 | 95.8 | |
Two-party-preferred result
| Labor | David Watkins | | 71.3 | ? |
| Liberal | Allen Fairhall | | 28.7 | +28.7 |
| Labor hold | | Swing | ? | |

==== 1943 ====
1943 Australian federal election: Newcastle
| Party | Candidate | Votes | % | ±% |
|---|---|---|---|---|
| Labor | David Watkins | 44,379 | 69.2 | −5.2 |
| Communist | Stan Deacon | 7,271 | 11.3 | +11.3 |
| Independent | James Bayley | 5,616 | 8.8 | +8.8 |
| Independent Labor | Fred Wright | 4,753 | 7.4 | +7.4 |
| Independent Labor | John Cain | 2,067 | 3.2 | +3.2 |
| Total formal votes | | 64,086 | 96.3 | |
| Informal votes | | 2,448 | 3.7 | |
| Turnout | | 66,534 | 97.0 | |
Two-party-preferred result
| Labor | David Watkins | | incalculable | ? |
| Labor hold | | Swing | ? | |

==== 1940 ====
1940 Australian federal election: Newcastle
| Party | Candidate | Votes | % | ±% |
|---|---|---|---|---|
| Labor | David Watkins | 44,170 | 74.4 | −4.9 |
| State Labor | Tom Hickey | 9,029 | 15.2 | +15.2 |
| Independent | Arthur Clarke | 6,190 | 10.4 | +10.4 |
| Total formal votes | | 59,389 | 97.3 | |
| Informal votes | | 1,649 | 2.7 | |
| Turnout | | 61,038 | 95.6 | |
Two-party-preferred result
| Labor | David Watkins | | 78.6 | −0.7 |
| State Labor | Tom Hickey | | 21.4 | +21.4 |
| Labor hold | | Swing | −0.7 | |

=== Elections in the 1930s ===
==== 1937 ====
1937 Australian federal election: Newcastle
| Party | Candidate | Votes | % | ±% |
|---|---|---|---|---|
| Labor | David Watkins | 44,085 | 79.3 | +21.2 |
| Independent | Hilton Sykes | 11,579 | 20.7 | +20.7 |
| Total formal votes | | 55,579 | 95.9 | |
| Informal votes | | 2,379 | 4.1 | |
| Turnout | | 57,958 | 97.3 | |
| Labor hold | | Swing | +21.2 | |

==== 1935 by-election ====
1935 Newcastle by-election
| Party | Candidate | Votes | % | ±% |
|---|---|---|---|---|
| Labor | David Watkins | 25,374 | 49.0 | −8.2 |
| Labor (NSW) | James Smith | 22,135 | 42.7 | +8.2 |
| Social Credit | Hilton Sykes | 4,302 | 8.3 | +8.3 |
| Total formal votes | | 51,811 | 98.3 | |
| Informal votes | | 908 | 1.7 | |
| Turnout | | 52,719 | 93.7 | |
Two-candidate-preferred result
| Labor | David Watkins | 27,867 | 53.8 | −4.3 |
| Labor (NSW) | James Smith | 23,944 | 46.2 | +4.3 |
| Labor hold | | Swing | −4.3 | |

David Watkins Sr. (Labor) died. The by-election was won by Watkins' son, David Oliver Watkins.

==== 1934 ====
1934 Australian federal election: Newcastle
| Party | Candidate | Votes | % | ±% |
|---|---|---|---|---|
| Labor | David Watkins | 29,600 | 57.2 | +25.1 |
| Labor (NSW) | James Smith | 17,853 | 34.5 | +7.6 |
| Communist | Sidney Bethune | 4,326 | 8.4 | +6.5 |
| Total formal votes | | 51,779 | 96.8 | |
| Informal votes | | 1,697 | 3.2 | |
| Turnout | | 53,476 | 97.1 | |
Two-party-preferred result
| Labor | David Watkins | | 58.1 | −6.0 |
| Labor (NSW) | James Smith | | 41.9 | +41.9 |
| Labor hold | | Swing | −6.0 | |

==== 1931 ====
1931 Australian federal election: Newcastle
| Party | Candidate | Votes | % | ±% |
|---|---|---|---|---|
| Labor | David Watkins | 15,290 | 30.5 | −69.5 |
| Labor (NSW) | James Kidd | 13,233 | 26.4 | +26.4 |
| All for Australia | Rowland Clark | 10,726 | 21.4 | +21.4 |
| Independent Labor | Walter Skelton | 10,037 | 20.0 | +20.0 |
| Communist | Jack Simpson | 910 | 1.8 | +1.8 |
| Total formal votes | | 50,196 | 95.0 | |
| Informal votes | | 2,665 | 5.0 | |
| Turnout | | 52,861 | 96.6 | |
Two-party-preferred result
| Labor | David Watkins | 32,194 | 64.1 | −35.9 |
| All for Australia | Rowland Clark | 18,002 | 35.9 | +35.9 |
| Labor hold | | Swing | −35.9 | |

=== Elections in the 1920s ===
==== 1929 ====
1929 Australian federal election: Newcastle
| Party | Candidate | Votes | % | ±% |
|---|---|---|---|---|
| Labor | David Watkins | unopposed | | |
| Labor hold | | Swing | | |

==== 1928 ====
1928 Australian federal election: Newcastle
| Party | Candidate | Votes | % | ±% |
|---|---|---|---|---|
| Labor | David Watkins | 26,952 | 57.1 | −5.4 |
| Protestant Labour | Walter Skelton | 20,212 | 42.9 | +42.9 |
| Total formal votes | | 47,164 | 95.9 | |
| Informal votes | | 2,028 | 4.1 | |
| Turnout | | 49,192 | 94.3 | |
| Labor hold | | Swing | −5.4 | |

==== 1925 ====
1925 Australian federal election: Newcastle
| Party | Candidate | Votes | % | ±% |
|---|---|---|---|---|
| Labor | David Watkins | 27,291 | 62.5 | +7.9 |
| Nationalist | George Waller | 16,378 | 37.5 | +12.9 |
| Total formal votes | | 43,669 | 98.2 | |
| Informal votes | | 805 | 1.8 | |
| Turnout | | 44,474 | 92.0 | |
| Labor hold | | Swing | −6.9 | |

==== 1922 ====
1922 Australian federal election: Newcastle
| Party | Candidate | Votes | % | ±% |
|---|---|---|---|---|
| Labor | David Watkins | 12,362 | 54.6 | −45.4 |
| Nationalist | John Willings | 5,580 | 24.6 | +24.6 |
| Independent Labor | Arthur Gardiner | 4,695 | 20.7 | +20.7 |
| Total formal votes | | 22,637 | 96.0 | |
| Informal votes | | 932 | 4.0 | |
| Turnout | | 23,569 | 55.7 | |
Two-party-preferred result
| Labor | David Watkins | | 69.4 | −30.6 |
| Nationalist | John Willings | | 30.6 | +30.6 |
| Labor hold | | Swing | −30.6 | |

=== Elections in the 1910s ===
==== 1919 ====
1919 Australian federal election: Newcastle
| Party | Candidate | Votes | % | ±% |
|---|---|---|---|---|
| Labor | David Watkins | unopposed | | |
| Labor hold | | Swing | | |

==== 1917 ====
1917 Australian federal election: Newcastle
| Party | Candidate | Votes | % | ±% |
|---|---|---|---|---|
| Labor | David Watkins | 17,643 | 58.0 | −42.0 |
| Nationalist | Arthur Griffith | 12,784 | 42.0 | +42.0 |
| Total formal votes | | 30,427 | 97.5 | |
| Informal votes | | 789 | 2.5 | |
| Turnout | | 31,216 | 69.5 | |
| Labor hold | | Swing | −42.0 | |

==== 1914 ====
1914 Australian federal election: Newcastle
| Party | Candidate | Votes | % | ±% |
|---|---|---|---|---|
| Labor | David Watkins | unopposed | | |
| Labor hold | | Swing | | |

==== 1913 ====
1913 Australian federal election: Newcastle
| Party | Candidate | Votes | % | ±% |
|---|---|---|---|---|
| Labor | David Watkins | 17,865 | 73.8 | −7.6 |
| Liberal | Thomas Collins | 6,334 | 26.2 | +7.6 |
| Total formal votes | | 24,199 | 96.8 | |
| Informal votes | | 812 | 3.2 | |
| Turnout | | 25,011 | 67.6 | |
| Labor hold | | Swing | −7.6 | |

==== 1910 ====
1910 Australian federal election: Newcastle
| Party | Candidate | Votes | % | ±% |
|---|---|---|---|---|
| Labour | David Watkins | 15,920 | 76.7 | +9.5 |
| Liberal | Frank Pulsford | 4,825 | 23.3 | −9.5 |
| Total formal votes | | 20,745 | 99.1 | |
| Informal votes | | 194 | 0.9 | |
| Turnout | | 20,939 | 66.7 | |
| Labour hold | | Swing | +9.5 | |

=== Elections in the 1900s ===
==== 1906 ====
1906 Australian federal election: Newcastle
| Party | Candidate | Votes | % | ±% |
|---|---|---|---|---|
| Labour | David Watkins | 11,952 | 67.2 | +4.7 |
| Anti-Socialist | John Hawthorne | 5,833 | 32.8 | −4.7 |
| Total formal votes | | 17,785 | 97.4 | |
| Informal votes | | 479 | 2.6 | |
| Turnout | | 18,264 | 61.3 | |
| Labour hold | | Swing | +4.7 | |

==== 1903 ====
1903 Australian federal election: Newcastle
| Party | Candidate | Votes | % | ±% |
|---|---|---|---|---|
| Labour | David Watkins | 9,839 | 62.5 | −1.8 |
| Free Trade | Richard Bowles | 5,899 | 37.5 | +2.6 |
| Total formal votes | | 15,738 | 96.0 | |
| Informal votes | | 653 | 4.0 | |
| Turnout | | 16,391 | 46.0 | |
| Labour hold | | Swing | −2.2 | |

==== 1901 ====
1901 Australian federal election: Newcastle
| Party | Candidate | Votes | % | ±% |
|---|---|---|---|---|
| Labour | David Watkins | 7,495 | 64.3 | +64.3 |
| Free Trade | Owen Gilbert | 4,072 | 34.9 | +34.9 |
| Independent Labour | John Bailey | 95 | 0.8 | +0.8 |
| Total formal votes | | 11,662 | 98.2 | |
| Informal votes | | 218 | 1.8 | |
| Turnout | | 11,880 | 97.0 | |
| Labour win | | (new seat) | | |
