= 1998 Newcastle supplementary election =

← Oct. 1998	21 November 1998	2001 →

Division of Newcastle (NSW) in the House of Representatives

	First party	Second party	Third party
Candidate	Allan Morris	Kate Taylor	Carrie Jacobi
Party	Labor	One Nation	Greens
Primary vote	31,441	10,466	5,965
Percentage	48.21%	16.05%	9.15%
Swing	▼1.94	▲16.05	▲0.42
TCP	67.33%		32.67%
TCP swing	▲6.14		▲32.67
MP before election
Allan Morris
Labor
Elected MP
Allan Morris
Labor

The 1998 Newcastle supplementary election was held on 21 November 1998 to elect the next member for the division of Newcastle in the Australian House of Representatives, following the death of a candidate during the 1998 federal election campaign.

Incumbent Labor MP Allan Morris was re-elected.

== Background ==
Australian Democrats candidate Kaye Westbury died on 1 October, two days before the federal election. As it was after the close of nominations, the election was declared 'failed' and a supplementary election had to be held.

The Liberal Party, who had Clive Jensen as their candidate, chose not to contest the supplementary election.

== Results ==
1998 Newcastle supplementary election
Party	Candidate	Votes	%	±%
Labor	Allan Morris	31,441	48.21	−1.94
One Nation	Kate Taylor	10,466	16.05	+16.05
Greens	Carrie Jacobi	5,965	9.15	+0.42
Democrats	Stephen Bisgrove	5,607	8.60	−1.29
Independent	Ivan Welsh	4,398	6.74	+6.74
Independent	Harry Criticos	2,718	4.17	+4.17
Christian Democrats	Greg Budworth	1,798	2.76	+2.76
Progressive Labour	Harry Williams	1,131	1.73	+1.73
Independent	Peter Boyd	757	1.16	+1.16
Democratic Socialist	Geoff Payne	662	1.01	+1.01
Citizens Electoral Council	Tony King	280	0.43	+0.43
Total formal votes		65,223	95.12	−2.04
Informal votes		3,347	4.88	+2.04
Turnout		68,570	88.37	−8.40
Two-candidate-preferred result
Labor	Allan Morris	43,917	67.33	+6.14
Greens	Carrie Jacobi	21,306	32.67	+32.67
Labor hold				
