= Wallsend railway line =

Former railway line in New South Wales

Wallsend Line
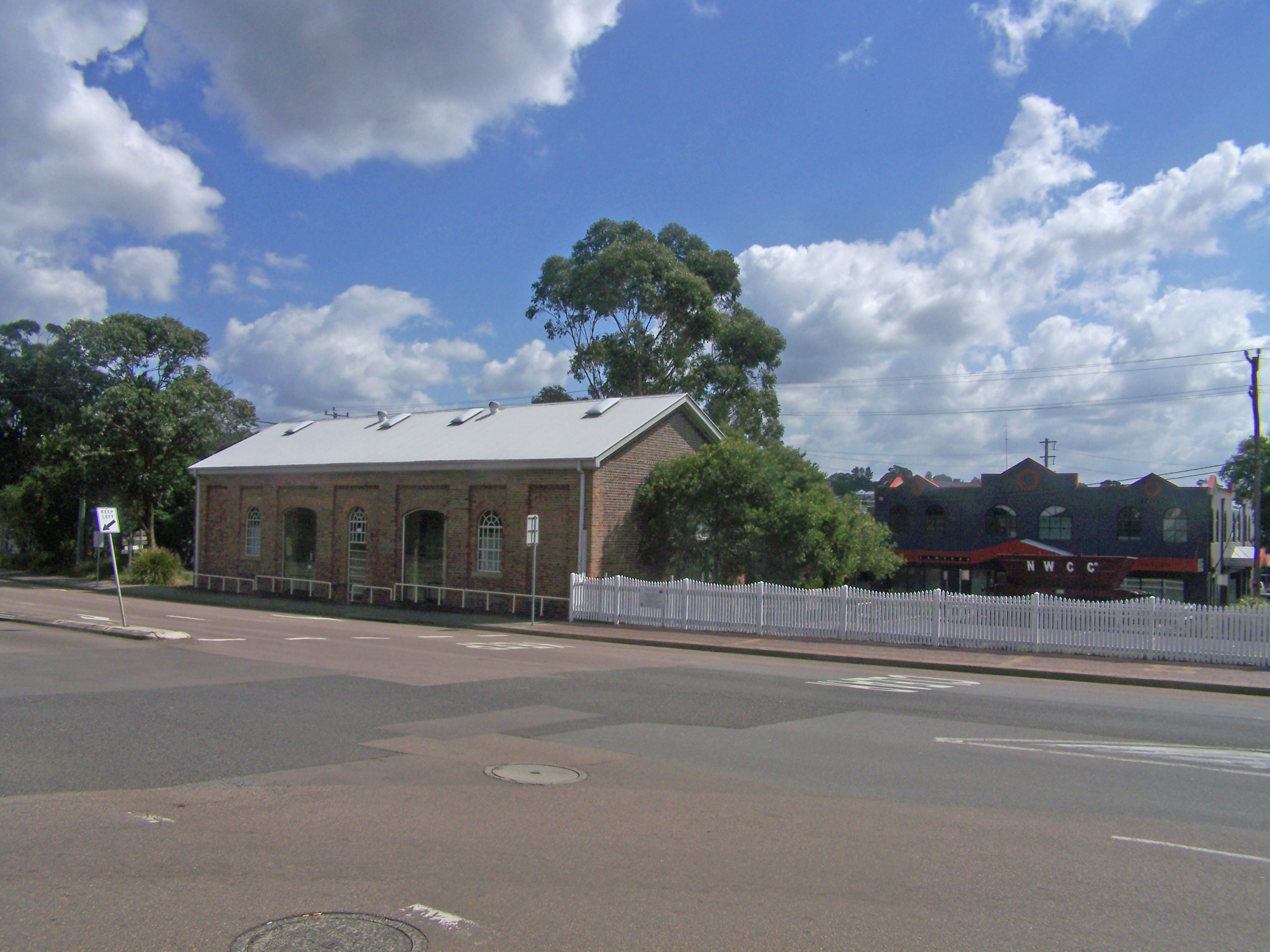
- Railway goods shed, Wallsend

Technical
Track gauge
1,435 mm (4 ft 8 1/2 in)

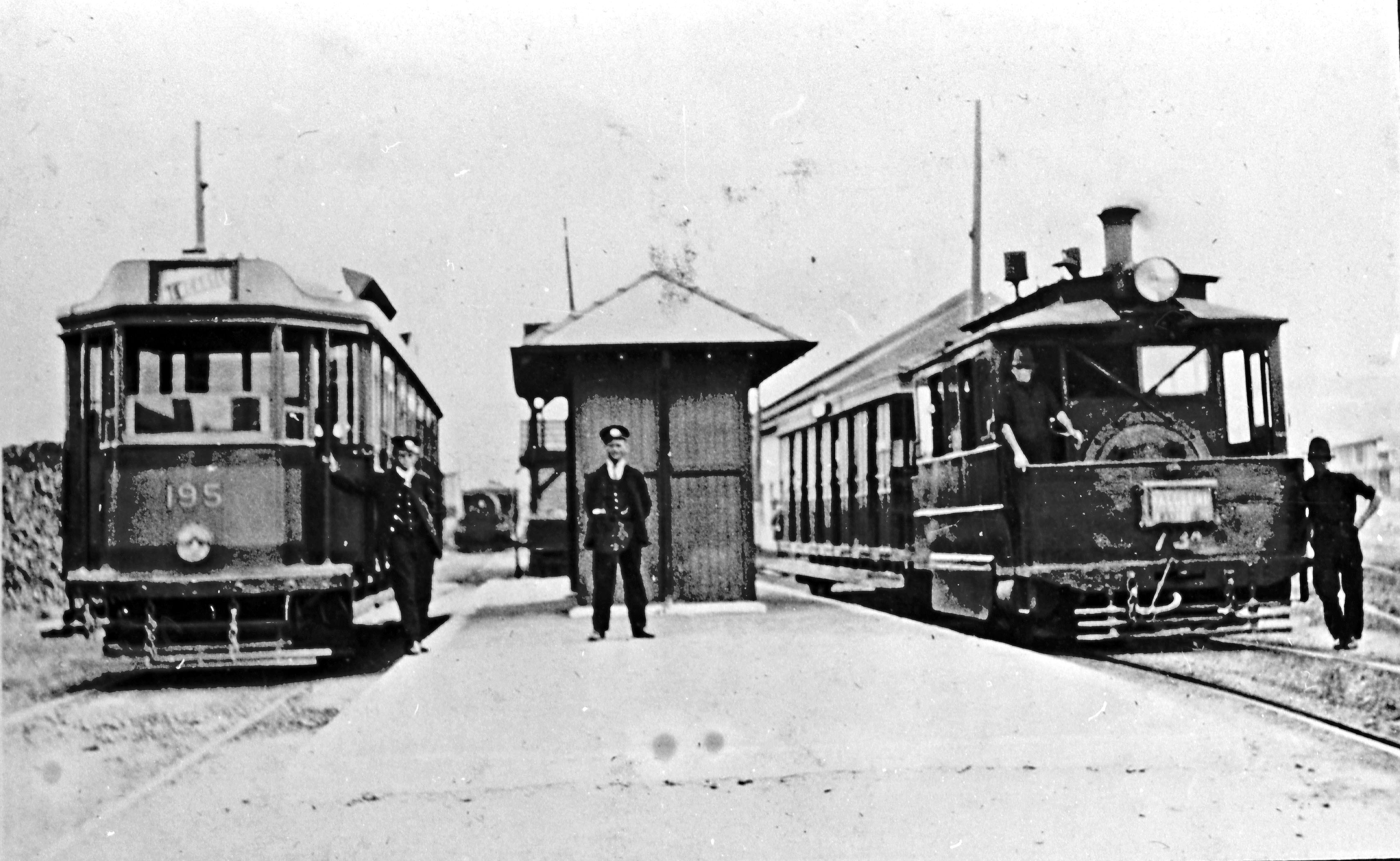
Electric tram car 195 and steam tram 73A with trailer at Wallsend terminus in 1930.

The Wallsend branch railway line is a closed branch railway line in New South Wales, Australia. It was standard gauge and 6.1 kilometres (3.8 mi) in length. The line was privately owned and built by the Newcastle Wallsend Coal Company in the early 1860s to service their collieries, and was enabled by the passage of the Newcastle Wallsend Coal Co. Railway Act 1860 in the New South Wales Parliament. Passenger services on the line were also provided by New South Wales Government Railways from Newcastle and terminated at Wallsend Railway Station adjoining the Nelson Street level crossing.

It branched off from the Main North line at Hanbury Junction at Waratah, and ran to and beyond the town of Wallsend. The line's main purpose was the transportation of coal from the Wallsend A B and C collieries and Wallsend Borehole collieries to the port of Newcastle. Upon the sinking of the Co-operative Colliery at Plattsburg (where Wallsend High School stands today) a branch from the line, with its junction at Stapleton Street, Wallsend, to that colliery was constructed. Another line also left the main Wallsend line at Moore Street, Jesmond, in order to service the Jesmond (later Elermore Vale) Colliery, the New Tunnel Colliery, and the coke ovens complex, on either side of Newcastle Road.

The Wallsend section had ceased to function by 1939 and all rails as far as the Jesmond Junction were lifted. The Jesmond branch continued operations till the mid-1950s. The level crossing gates (c1860) at Nelson Street, Wallsend are still extant, and the Wallsend Railway Goods Shed built in 1877 at the corner of Cowper and Nelson Streets has been converted into an office building.

== See also ==
- Rail transport in New South Wales
