= Kerry Thompson =

Kerry Thompson may refer to:

- Kerry Thompson-Moore, female English field hockey player
- Kerry Thompson (cricketer), male Australian cricketer
