= Post-election pendulum for the 2022 Australian federal election =

The Australian Labor Party won the 2022 federal election, winning 77 of 151 seats in the House of Representatives. The Coalition holds 58 seats, and crossbenchers hold the remaining 16.

Classification of seats as marginal, fairly safe or safe is applied by the independent Australian Electoral Commission using the following definition: "Where a winning party receives less than 56% of the vote, the seat is classified as 'marginal', 56–60% is classified as 'fairly safe' and more than 60% is considered 'safe'." Here, 'the vote' is defined as the vote after preferences, where the distribution of preferences has continued to the point where there are only 2 candidates left.

== Pendulum ==
The Mackerras pendulum was devised by the Australian psephologist Malcolm Mackerras as a way of predicting the outcome of an election contested between two major parties in a Westminster style lower house legislature such as the Australian House of Representatives, which is composed of single-member electorates and which uses a preferential voting system such as a Condorcet method or instant-runoff voting.

The pendulum works by lining up all of the seats held in Parliament for the government, the opposition and the crossbenches according to the percentage point margin they are held by on a two party preferred basis. This is also known as the swing required for the seat to change hands. Given a uniform swing to the opposition or government parties, the number of seats that change hands can be predicted.

Government seats - 77
Marginal
Gilmore	NSW	Fiona Phillips	ALP	0.17
Lyons	Tas	Brian Mitchell	ALP	0.92
Lingiari	NT	Marion Scrymgour	ALP	0.95
Bennelong	NSW	Jerome Laxale	ALP	0.97
Higgins	Vic	Michelle Ananda-Rajah	ALP	2.06
Robertson	NSW	Gordon Reid	ALP	2.27
Tangney	WA	Sam Lim	ALP	2.37
McEwen	Vic	Rob Mitchell	ALP	3.24
Paterson	NSW	Meryl Swanson	ALP	3.27
Boothby	SA	Louise Miller-Frost	ALP	3.28
Hunter	NSW	Daniel Repacholi	ALP	4.08
Parramatta	NSW	Andrew Charlton	ALP	4.30
Blair	Qld	Shayne Neumann	ALP	5.23
Reid	NSW	Sally Sitou	ALP	5.24
Shortland	NSW	Pat Conroy	ALP	5.25
Dobell	NSW	Emma McBride	ALP	5.61
Werriwa	NSW	Anne Stanley	ALP	5.89
Hasluck	WA	Tania Lawrence	ALP	5.95
Fairly safe
Dunkley	Vic	Peta Murphy	ALP	6.27
Chisholm	Vic	Carina Garland	ALP	6.34
Bruce	Vic	Julian Hill	ALP	6.58
Isaacs	Vic	Mark Dreyfus	ALP	6.90
Holt	Vic	Cassandra Fernando	ALP	7.12
Hawke	Vic	Sam Rae	ALP	7.63
Corangamite	Vic	Libby Coker	ALP	7.64
Richmond	NSW	Justine Elliot	ALP	7.76
Macquarie	NSW	Susan Templeman	ALP	7.73
Eden-Monaro	NSW	Kristy McBain	ALP	8.09
Wills	Vic	Peter Khalil	ALP vs. GRN	8.53
Cooper	Vic	Ged Kearney	ALP vs. GRN	8.68
Macarthur	NSW	Mike Freelander	ALP	8.69
Hindmarsh	SA	Mark Butler	ALP	8.95
Pearce	WA	Tracey Roberts	ALP	8.98
Swan	WA	Zaneta Mascarenhas	ALP	8.99
Rankin	Qld	Jim Chalmers	ALP	9.09
Moreton	Qld	Graham Perrett	ALP	9.09
Solomon	NT	Luke Gosling	ALP	9.37
McMahon	NSW	Chris Bowen	ALP	9.49
Gorton	Vic	Brendan O'Connor	ALP	9.97
Safe
Whitlam	NSW	Stephen Jones	ALP	10.07
Lilley	Qld	Anika Wells	ALP	10.54
Cowan	WA	Anne Aly	ALP	10.79
Makin	SA	Tony Zappia	ALP	10.80
Gellibrand	Vic	Tim Watts	ALP	11.41
Greenway	NSW	Michelle Rowland	ALP	11.54
Oxley	Qld	Milton Dick	ALP	11.59
Adelaide	SA	Steve Georganas	ALP	11.91
Bendigo	Vic	Lisa Chesters	ALP	12.11
Canberra	ACT	Alicia Payne	ALP vs. GRN	12.20
Macnamara	Vic	Josh Burns	ALP	12.25
Jagajaga	Vic	Kate Thwaites	ALP	12.34
Maribyrnong	Vic	Bill Shorten	ALP	12.38
Calwell	Vic	Maria Vamvakinou	ALP	12.39
Lalor	Vic	Joanne Ryan	ALP	12.82
Spence	SA	Matt Burnell	ALP	12.90
Bean	ACT	David Smith	ALP	12.95
Ballarat	Vic	Catherine King	ALP	12.97
Corio	Vic	Richard Marles	ALP	13.01
Chifley	NSW	Ed Husic	ALP	13.36
Franklin	Tas	Julie Collins	ALP	13.70
Hotham	Vic	Clare O'Neil	ALP	14.25
Kingsford Smith	NSW	Matt Thistlethwaite	ALP	14.51
Cunningham	NSW	Alison Byrnes	ALP	14.70
Perth	WA	Patrick Gorman	ALP	14.80
Blaxland	NSW	Jason Clare	ALP	14.94
Burt	WA	Matt Keogh	ALP	15.21
Watson	NSW	Tony Burke	ALP	15.21
Barton	NSW	Linda Burney	ALP	15.54
Scullin	Vic	Andrew Giles	ALP	15.58
Fenner	ACT	Andrew Leigh	ALP	15.69
Kingston	SA	Amanda Rishworth	ALP	16.35
Sydney	NSW	Tanya Plibersek	ALP vs. GRN	16.56
Brand	WA	Madeleine King	ALP	16.71
Fraser	Vic	Daniel Mulino	ALP	16.73
Fremantle	WA	Josh Wilson	ALP	16.89
Grayndler	NSW	Anthony Albanese	ALP vs. GRN	17.06
Newcastle	NSW	Sharon Claydon	ALP	17.98

Opposition seats - 58
Marginal
Deakin	Vic	Michael Sukkar	LIB	0.19
Sturt	SA	James Stevens	LIB	0.45
Moore	WA	Ian Goodenough	LIB	0.66
Menzies	Vic	Keith Wolahan	LIB	0.68
Bass	Tas	Bridget Archer	LIB	1.43
Casey	Vic	Aaron Violi	LIB	1.48
Dickson	Qld	Peter Dutton	LNP	1.70
Cowper	NSW	Pat Conaghan	NAT vs. IND	2.32
Aston	Vic	Alan Tudge (Note: Alan Tudge resigned from parliament in 2023 and the ensuing by-election was won by Labor candidate Mary Doyle)	LIB	2.81
Monash	Vic	Russell Broadbent (Note: Broadbent resigned from the Liberal party after losing preselection in November 2023, and now sits as an independent)	LIB	2.90
Longman	Qld	Terry Young	LNP	3.08
Banks	NSW	David Coleman	LIB	3.20
Bonner	Qld	Ross Vasta	LNP	3.41
Leichhardt	Qld	Warren Entsch	LNP	3.44
Canning	WA	Andrew Hastie	LIB	3.59
Nicholls	Vic	Sam Birrell	NAT vs. IND	3.81
Flynn	Qld	Colin Boyce	LNP	3.82
Wannon	Vic	Dan Tehan	LIB vs. IND	3.92
Bradfield	NSW	Paul Fletcher	LIB vs. IND	4.21
Forde	Qld	Bert Van Manen	LNP	4.23
Durack	WA	Melissa Price	LIB	4.27
Forrest	WA	Nola Marino	LIB	4.29
Petrie	Qld	Luke Howarth	LNP	4.44
Bowman	Qld	Henry Pike	LNP	5.51
Fairly safe
Lindsay	NSW	Melissa McIntosh	LIB	6.34
Capricornia	Qld	Michelle Landry	LNP	6.59
Flinders	Vic	Zoe McKenzie	LIB	6.70
Groom	Qld	Garth Hamilton	LNP vs. IND	6.89
O'Connor	WA	Rick Wilson	LIB	6.97
Hughes	NSW	Jenny Ware	LIB	7.01
Hume	NSW	Angus Taylor	LIB	7.72
Braddon	Tas	Gavin Pearce	LIB	8.03
Fisher	Qld	Andrew Wallace	LNP	8.67
La Trobe	Vic	Jason Wood	LIB	8.69
Fairfax	Qld	Ted O'Brien	LNP	8.97
McPherson	Qld	Karen Andrews	LNP	9.34
Calare	NSW	Andrew Gee (Note: Andrew Gee resigned in 2022 to sit as an independent.)	NAT vs. IND	9.68
Berowra	NSW	Julian Leeser	LIB	9.77
Safe
Grey	SA	Rowan Ramsey	LIB	10.07
Hinkler	Qld	Keith Pitt	LNP	10.07
Dawson	Qld	Andrew Willcox	LNP	10.42
Fadden	Qld	Stuart Robert (Note: Stuart Robert resigned from parliament in 2023 and the ensuing by-election was won by LNP candidate Cameron Caldwell)	LNP	10.63
Mitchell	NSW	Alex Hawke	LIB	10.69
Page	NSW	Kevin Hogan	NAT	10.74
Wright	Qld	Scott Buchholz	LNP	10.89
Moncrieff	Qld	Angie Bell	LNP	11.19
Wide Bay	Qld	Llew O'Brien	LNP	11.34
Herbert	Qld	Phillip Thompson	LNP	11.77
Cook	NSW	Scott Morrison	LIB	12.44
Lyne	NSW	David Gillespie	NAT	13.80
Riverina	NSW	Michael McCormack	NAT	14.85
Farrer	NSW	Sussan Ley	LIB	16.35
New England	NSW	Barnaby Joyce	NAT	16.43
Barker	SA	Tony Pasin	LIB	16.62
Parkes	NSW	Mark Coulton	NAT	17.84
Mallee	Vic	Anne Webster	NAT	18.99
Gippsland	Vic	Darren Chester	NAT	20.57
Maranoa	Qld	David Littleproud	LNP	22.12

Crossbench seats - 16
Greens seats - 4
Marginal
Ryan	Qld	Elizabeth Watson-Brown	GRN vs. LNP	2.65
Brisbane	Qld	Stephen Bates	GRN vs. LNP	3.73
Safe
Melbourne	Vic	Adam Bandt	GRN vs. ALP	10.15
Griffith	Qld	Max Chandler-Mather	GRN vs. LNP	10.46
Other Crossbench - 12
Marginal
Curtin	WA	Kate Chaney	IND vs. LIB	1.26
Fowler	NSW	Dai Le	IND vs. ALP	1.63
Mackellar	NSW	Sophie Scamps	IND vs. LIB	2.50
Goldstein	Vic	Zoe Daniel	IND vs. LIB	2.87
North Sydney	NSW	Kylea Tink	IND vs. LIB	2.91
Kooyong	Vic	Monique Ryan	IND vs. LIB	2.94
Wentworth	NSW	Allegra Spender	IND vs. LIB	4.19
Fairly safe
Indi	Vic	Helen Haines	IND vs. LIB	9.08
Safe
Warringah	NSW	Zali Steggall	IND vs. LIB	10.92
Mayo	SA	Rebekha Sharkie	CA vs. LIB	12.27
Kennedy	Qld	Bob Katter	KAP vs. LNP	13.10
Clark	Tas	Andrew Wilkie	IND vs. ALP	20.82

== Analysis ==
ABC psephologist Antony Green observed that due to the considerably expanded size of the crossbench following this election, the traditional two-column format of the Mackerras pendulum had become strained, and that the crossbench deserved more attention than its position at the bottom-right of the table suggested.

Election analyst Ben Raue observed that the use of the two-party-preferred count in the Mackerras Pendulum also had the effect of classifying several seats as safer than they really were: for example, the seat of Macnamara ended up with a 12.25% margin of victory for the Labor candidate, but if just 0.64% of voters had changed their preference to rank the Greens higher than Labor, Labor would have finished third, with the Greens winning the seat by a similarly large margin.

To overcome some of these limitations, the pollster Jim Reed produced a new Reed Pendulum after the 2022 election. This uses a two-candidate-preferred margin to classify each seat instead of a notional two-party preference count for the major parties, and has three arms so that contests involving minor parties and independent candidates are more clearly identified. One or two swing figures can be used to calculate seat changes along the arms.

=== Change in composition ===
==== Seats changing classification ====
- Includes gains.

Seat	Classification		Swing (to winner)
Seat	2019	2022	Swing (to winner)
Aston (VIC)	Safe Liberal	Marginal Liberal	–7.32
Banks (NSW)	Fairly safe Liberal	Marginal Liberal	–3.06
Bendigo (VIC)	Fairly safe Labor	Safe Labor	+3.29
Bennelong (NSW)	Fairly safe Liberal	Marginal Labor	+7.89
Boothby (SA)	Marginal Liberal	Marginal Labor	+4.66
Braddon (TAS)	Marginal Liberal	Fairly safe Liberal	+4.94
Brisbane (QLD)	Marginal LNP	Marginal Greens	+53.73
Calwell (VIC)	Very safe Labor	Safe Labor	–7.32
Chisholm (VIC)	Marginal Liberal	Fairly safe Labor	+6.86
Cooper (VIC)	Very safe Labor	Safe Labor	–6.16
Corangamite (VIC)	Marginal Labor	Fairly Labor	+6.55
Cowan (WA)	Marginal Labor	Safe Labor	+9.96
Cowper (NSW)	Fairly safe National	Marginal National	–4.47
Curtin (WA)	Safe Liberal	Marginal Independent	+51.20
Bonner (QLD)	Fairly safe LNP	Marginal LNP	–4.00
Bowman (QLD)	Safe LNP	Marginal LNP	–4.73
Capricornia (QLD)	Safe LNP	Fairly safe LNP	–4.00
Dunkley (VIC)	Marginal Labor	Fairly safe Labor	+3.52
Eden-Monaro (NSW)	Marginal Labor	Fairly safe Labor	+7.35
Fairfax (QLD)	Safe LNP	Fairly safe LNP	–4.00
Fisher (QLD)	Safe LNP	Fairly safe LNP	–4.03
Flinders (VIC)	Marginal Liberal	Fairly safe Liberal	+1.06
Flynn (QLD)	Fairly safe LNP	Marginal LNP	–4.84
Forde (QLD)	Fairly safe LNP	Marginal LNP	–4.37
Fowler (NSW)	Safe Labor	Marginal Independent	+51.63
Gippsland (VIC)	Safe National	Very safe National	+3.90
Goldstein (VIC)	Fairly safe Liberal	Marginal Independent	+52.87
Gorton (VIC)	Safe Labor	Fairly safe Labor	–7.32
Greenway (NSW)	Marginal Labor	Safe Labor	+8.73
Griffith (QLD)	Marginal Labor	Safe Greens	+60.46
Groom (QLD)	Very safe LNP	Fairly safe LNP	–13.60
Hasluck (WA)	Marginal Liberal	Fairly safe Labor	+11.89
Herbert (QLD)	Fairly safe LNP	Safe LNP	+3.41
Higgins (VIC)	Marginal Liberal	Marginal Labor	+4.67
Indi (VIC)	Marginal Independent	Fairly safe Independent	+7.55
Jagajaga (VIC)	Fairly safe Labor	Safe Labor	+6.46
Kooyong (VIC)	Marginal Liberal	Marginal Independent	+52.94
La Trobe (VIC)	Marginal Liberal	Fairly safe Liberal	+3.56
Lilley (QLD)	Marginal Labor	Safe Labor	+9.90
Lindsay (NSW)	Marginal Liberal	Fairly safe Liberal	+1.30
Mackellar (NSW)	Safe Liberal	Marginal Independent	+52.50
Macnamara (VIC)	Fairly safe Labor	Safe Labor	+7.34
Macquarie (NSW)	Marginal Labor	Fairly safe Labor	+7.58
Mallee (VIC)	Safe National	Very safe National	+3.31
McPherson (QLD)	Safe LNP	Fairly safe LNP	–2.86
Melbourne (VIC)	Very safe Greens	Safe Greens	–12.44
Menzies (VIC)	Fairly safe Liberal	Marginal Liberal	–6.34
Monash (VIC)	Fairly safe Liberal	Marginal Liberal	–3.96
Moreton (QLD)	Marginal Labor	Fairly safe Labor	+7.19
Nicholls (VIC)	Very safe National	Marginal National	–16.22
North Sydney (NSW)	Safe Liberal	Marginal Independent	+52.92
Oxley (QLD)	Fairly safe Labor	Safe Labor	+5.20
Pearce (WA)	Marginal Liberal	Fairly safe Labor	+14.23
Petrie (QLD)	Fairly safe LNP	Marginal LNP	–3.96
Reid (NSW)	Marginal Liberal	Marginal Labor	+8.37
Richmond (NSW)	Marginal Labor	Fairly safe Labor	+4.15
Robertson (NSW)	Marginal Liberal	Marginal Labor	+6.50
Ryan (QLD)	Fairly safe LNP	Marginal Greens	+52.65
Scullin (VIC)	Very safe Labor	Safe Labor	–6.08
Sturt (SA)	Fairly safe Liberal	Marginal Liberal	–6.42
Swan (WA)	Marginal Liberal	Fairly safe Labor	+11.99
Tangney (WA)	Fairly safe Liberal	Marginal Labor	+11.88
Wannon (VIC)	Safe Liberal	Marginal Liberal	–6.24
Wentworth (NSW)	Marginal Liberal	Marginal Independent	+54.19
