= David Oliver Watkins =

Australian politician

David Watkins
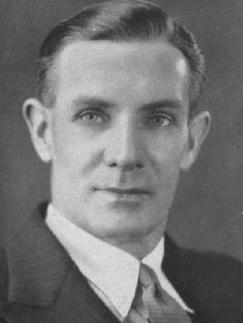

Member of the Australian Parliament for Newcastle
- In office 1 June 1935 – 14 October 1958
- Preceded by: David Watkins
- Succeeded by: Charles Jones

Personal details
- Born: 10 June 1896 Wallsend, New South Wales
- Died: 17 December 1971 (aged 75)
- Party: Australian Labor Party
- Relations: David Watkins (father)

David Oliver Watkins (10 July 1896 – 17 December 1971) was an Australian politician. He was an Australian Labor Party member of the Australian House of Representatives from 1935 until 1958, representing the electorate of Newcastle.

Watkins was born in Wallsend, New South Wales, the son of long-serving federal Newcastle MP David Watkins, and was educated at Cook's Hill Public School. He worked as a woolclasser until 1915, when he enlisted for service in World War I. He embarked in February 1916 and served with the 1st Mounted Wireless Signals in Mesopotamia, but he became seriously ill with malaria later that year and returned to Australia in February 1917. He was later reported to have worked in the steel industry, and he was working as a storeman at the time of his election to parliament.

Watkins was elected to the House of Representatives at a 1935 by-election for the seat of Newcastle following the death of his father. He defeated Lang Labor candidate and former state MP James Smith by over 2,000 votes. In parliament, Watkins served on a series of committees as a member of the Printing Committee from 1937 to 1940, the House Committee from 1940 to 1951, the Prices and Profits Committee in 1941, deputy chairman of the Australian Soldiers Repatriation Act Committee from 1942 to 1943, deputy chairman of the Broadcasting Committee from 1943 to 1949, and a member of the Public Works Committee from 1950 to 1954. He was also temporary chairman of committees from 1940 to 1954.

In 1940, at the age of 44, Watkins enlisted for service in World War II with the Royal Australian Air Force, seeking to be engaged in administrative work at home or overseas. In 1943, he led an Australian delegation to Great Britain and Canada at the invitation of the Empire Parliamentary Association. He held the seat until his retirement due to ill health in 1958 following several months of sick leave.

Watkins purchased a home in Surfers Paradise, Queensland in July 1956 and retired there after his retirement from parliament in 1958.

He died in 1971.

Parliament of Australia
Preceded by David Watkins	Member for Newcastle; 1935–1958	Succeeded by Charles Jones
