= Wallsend Racecourse =

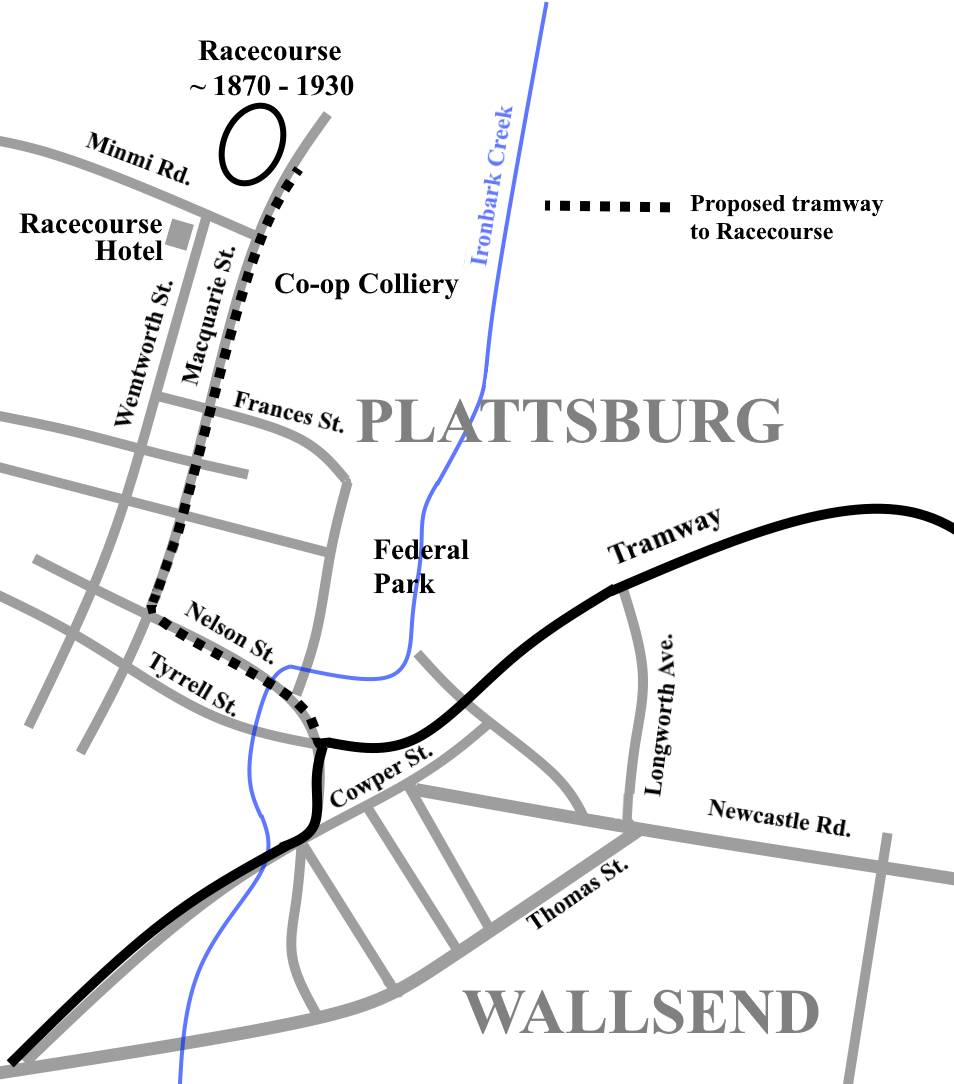
- Location: Wallsend, Australia
- Coordinates: 32.8895°S 151.6689°E
- Date opened: 26 December 1868
- Date closed: 1930

Wallsend Racecourse is a former racecourse near the suburb of Wallsend, New South Wales, Australia.

== The early years ==
The first Jockey Club meeting was held on Wednesday and Thursday, 26 and 27 December 1868. The event was held at Ricklar's paddock, a site that where the ground proved unsuitable for racing.

The second site for Wallsend's racecourse (opposite today's Minmi Road "Racecourse Hotel") came into existence in 1880 when steeplechases were popular. From 1880 to 1925, or so, an active program of race days was pursued. Visitors from Newcastle often came to Wallsend by tram (after 1887) and then walked the mile or so (1.7 km) from the tram terminus in Wallsend to the racecourse beyond the corner of Macquarie Street and Minmi Road. The 1890s depression and The Great War were difficult periods for the turf club and the racegoers.

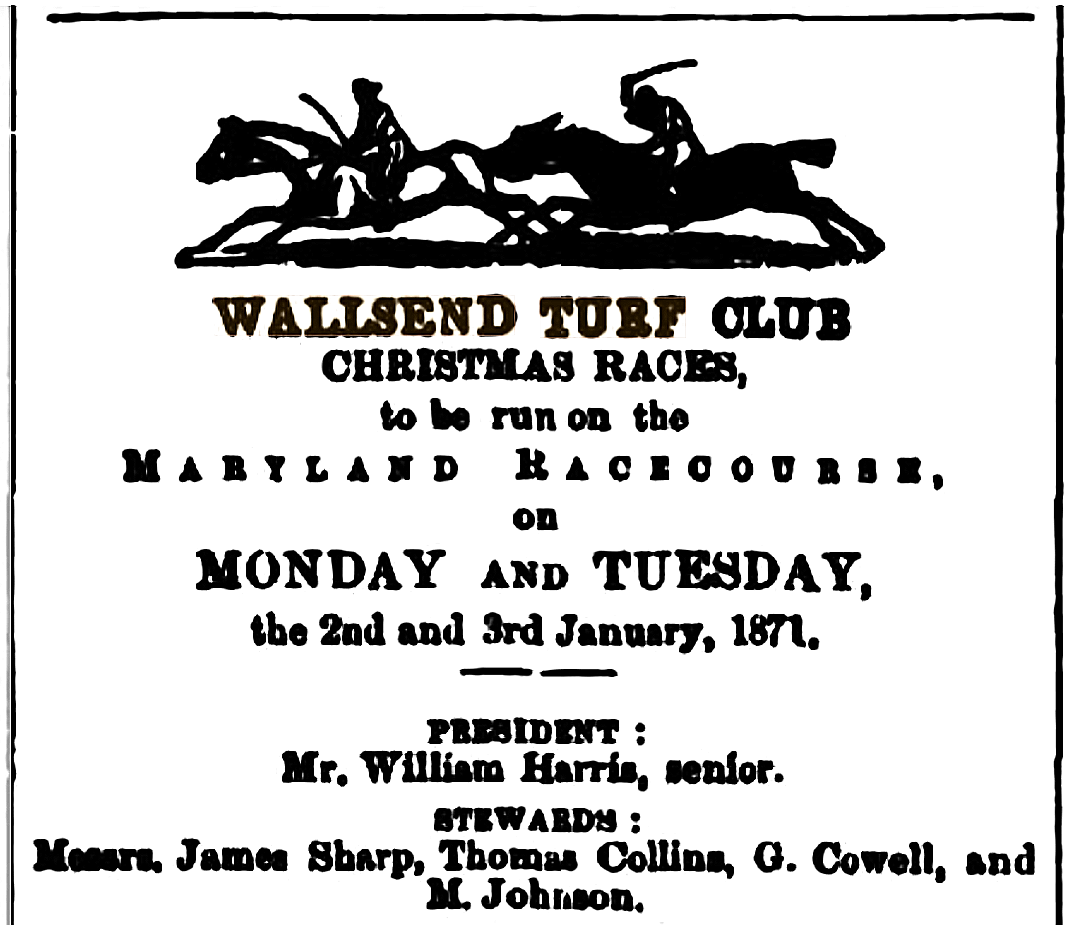

Note the "Christmas Races" on 2 and 3 January 1871 in spite of the recent weather they are planned for the Maryland Racecourse as the Committee has decided to "soldier on".

The Wallsend Races were popular. For some race days three crowded trams brought punters from the suburbs with tram-stops along the line from Newcastle to Jesmond and onto Wallsend tram terminus. The committee of Wallsend Jockey Club became motivated by a plan for a spur line to Macquarie Street (near Co-op Colliery) to 'deliver' the punters near to the racecourse.

== The 20th century ==
The Club made a request to the Colonial government for a new branch line from Wallsend via Nelson and Macquarie Streets to the Racecourse. Tramways of Newcastle (page 20) notes that a one mile (1.6 km) "branch line was approved by the Government in 1916." The route would have "involved grades beyond the capacity of the steam motors!". Work did commence in 1916 and the Club contributed £1000 to an expenditure of £3,156. By August 1916 the Government was conscious of the prospect of limited usage of the line and likely cost blowouts if building proceeded. The spur tram-line was never completed!

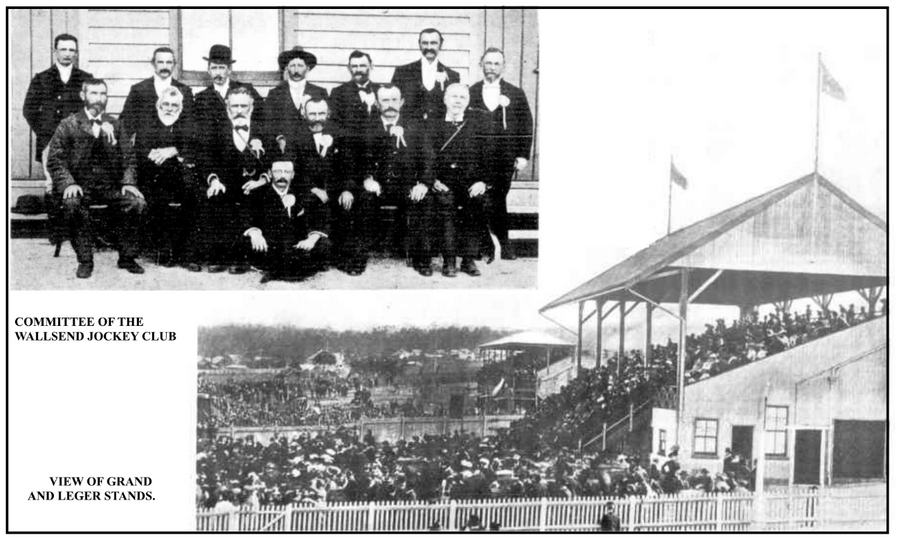

Note the crowds in the 26 August 1903 race meeting, by 1930 the racing club was no longer viable. It held its last race meeting in 1930 and the land was sold the following year. The onset of the 1929 Great Depression was too much for the club following-on from The Great War, 1914-18, and the 1920s in which it endured a challenging post-war economic period. It seems that the difficulties that presented in 1930 were the 'last straw'. The decision was taken to sell the site, to cover the debts of the club, in March 1931 Other race clubs in the district; Boolaroo, Rutherford and Singleton, were struggling as well.
