= Kerry Thompson (cricketer) =

Australian cricketer (born 1949)

Personal information
- Born: 12 December 1949 (age 76); Wallsend, New South Wales, Australia
- Source: ESPNcricinfo, 3 February 2017

Kerry Thompson (born 12 December 1949) is an Australian cricketer. He played four first-class matches for New South Wales in 1977/78.

== See also ==
- List of New South Wales representative cricketers
