= Wallsend Railway Goods Shed =

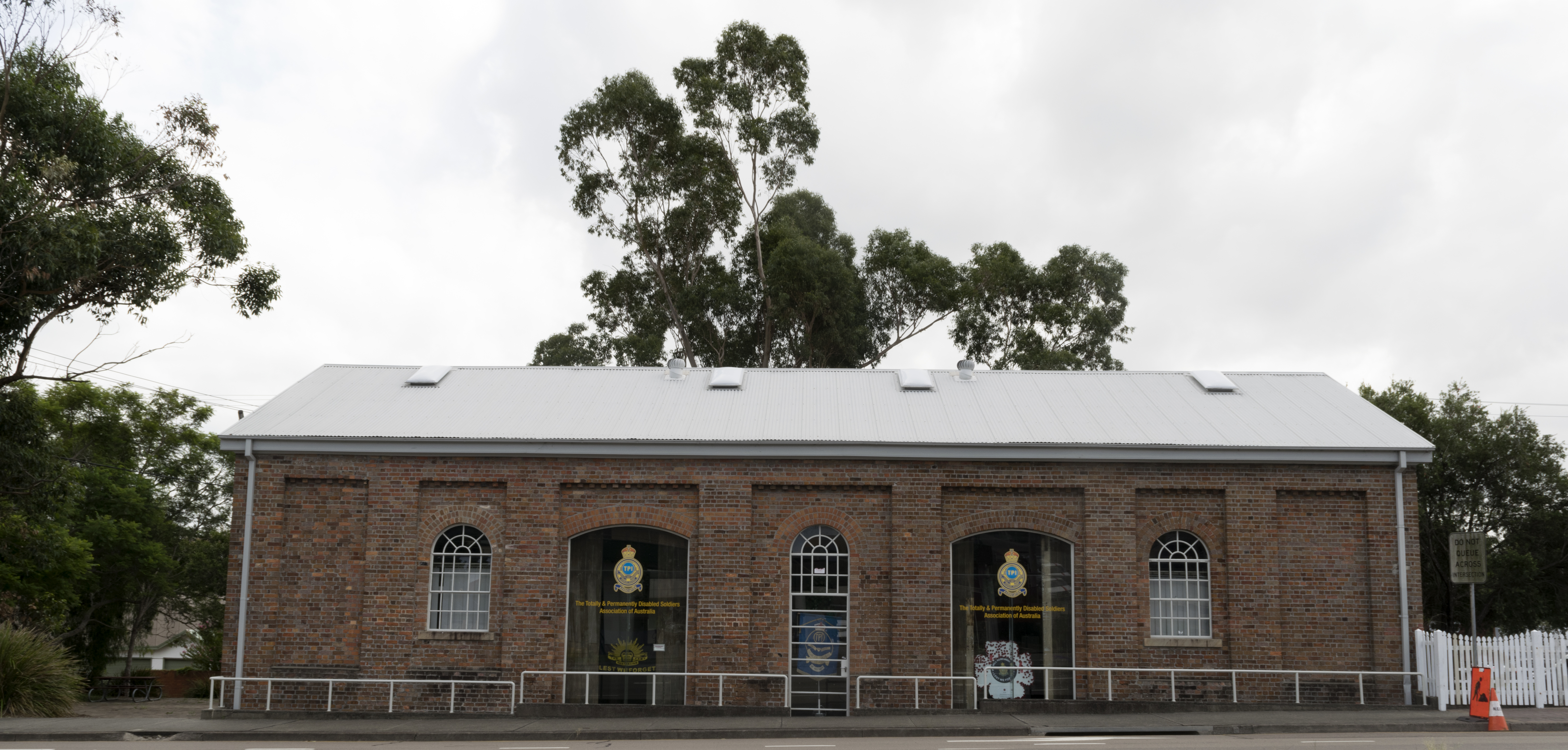
- Wallsend railway goods shed, 2018

- Location within New South Wales Location within Australia
- 32.9033°S 151.6690°E
- Location: 76 Cowper Street, Wallsend, City of Newcastle, New South Wales, Australia

Site notes
- Owner: Newcastle City Council

New South Wales Heritage Register
- Official name: Railway Goods Shed; Wallsend Locomotive Shed
- Type: state heritage (built)
- Designated: 2 April 1999
- Reference no.: 739
- Type: historic site

Wallsend Railway Goods Shed is a heritage-listed former goods shed at 76 Cowper Street, Wallsend, City of Newcastle, New South Wales, Australia. It is also known as Wallsend Locomotive Shed. The property is owned by Newcastle City Council. It was added to the New South Wales State Heritage Register on 2 April 1999.

== History ==
The goods shed was built in 1877 on the Wallsend railway line, replacing an earlier timber building built nearby c. 1868. The plans indicated a shed 80 feet long by 20 feed wide with two double doors at the back for the purpose of unloading goods. A new Wallsend railway station was built at the same time, replacing an earlier station.

In later years it served a number of purposes, including as a car sales yard and as the Wallsend Enterprise Centre. It was threatened with demolition for roadworks in 1989, but was preserved due to an Interim Heritage Order in December 1989.

In 2018, the former goods shed serves as the office of the Totally & Permanently Incapacitated Veterans' Association of New South Wales.

== Heritage listing ==
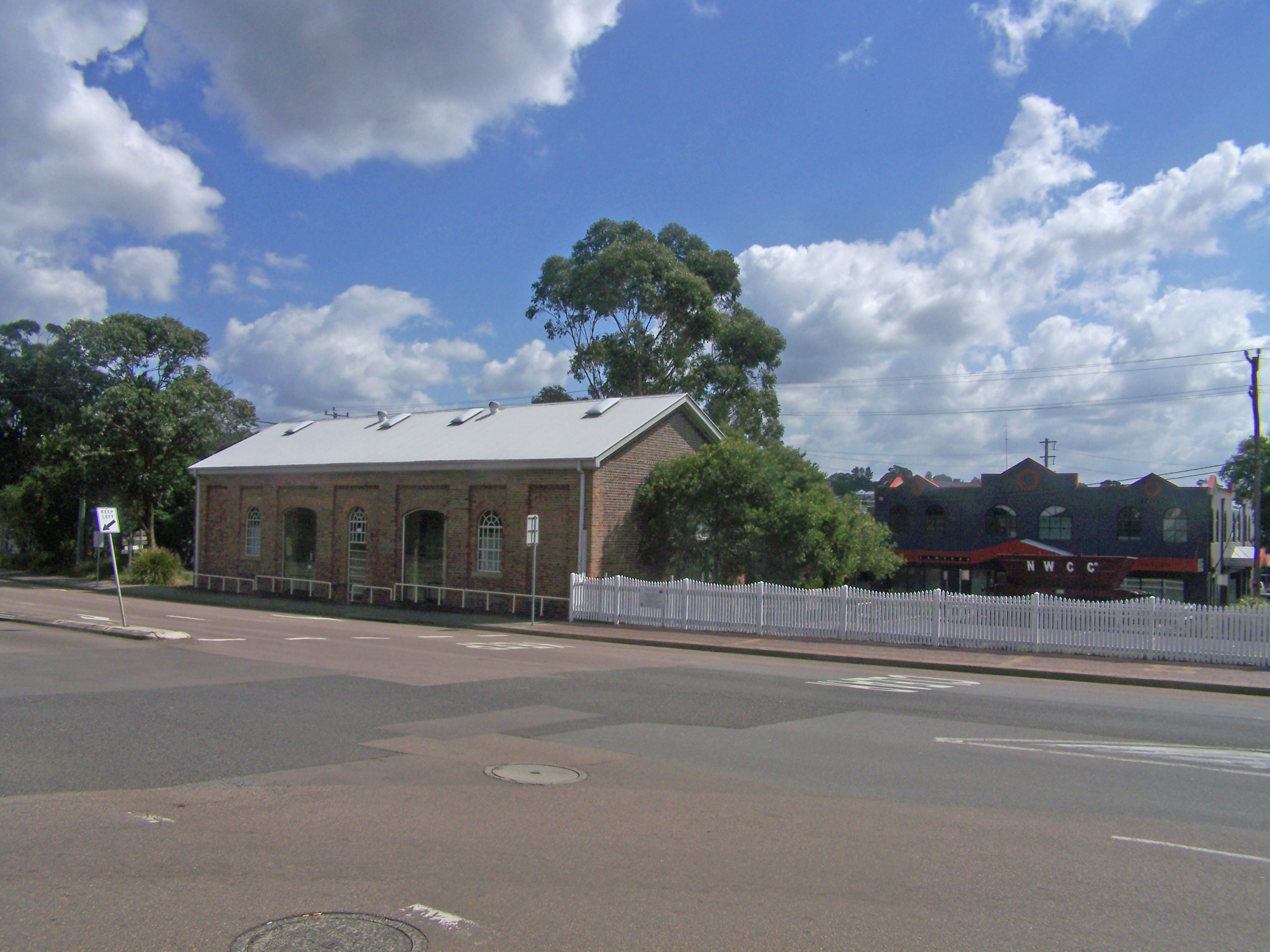
Street view, 2011

The Wallsend Railway Goods Shed is the only remaining structure of the Newcastle Wallsend Coalmining Railway (closed in 1939) and one of the few remaining railway goods brick sheds in New South Wales.

Wallsend Railway Goods Shed was listed on the New South Wales State Heritage Register on 2 April 1999.
