= 1935 Newcastle by-election =

- 1 June 1935
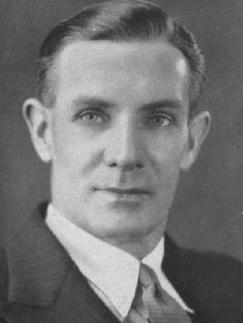
	First party	Second party
		LAB
Candidate	David Watkins	James Smith
Party	Labor	Labor (NSW)
Popular vote	25,374	22,135
Percentage	49.0%	42.7%
Swing	▼8.2pp	▲8.2pp
TPP	53.8%	46.2%
TPP swing	▼4.3pp	▲4.3pp
MP before election
David Watkins
Labor
Elected MP
David Watkins
Labor

A by-election was held for the Australian House of Representatives seat of Newcastle on 1 June 1935. This was triggered by the death of long-serving Labor MP David Watkins. Following Watkins' death, only Billy Hughes and Senator George Pearce remained of those elected at the first federal election in 1901.

The by-election was won by Watkins' son, David Oliver Watkins. As Newcastle was the only remaining New South Wales seat held by the federal Labor Party, the by-election was closely fought with the breakaway New South Wales Labor Party, supporters of the controversial former premier Jack Lang.

== Results ==
1935 Newcastle by-election
Party	Candidate	Votes	%	±%
Labor	David Watkins	25,374	49.0	−8.2
Labor (NSW)	James Smith	22,135	42.7	+8.2
Social Credit	Hilton Sykes	4,302	8.3	+8.3
Total formal votes		51,811	98.3	
Informal votes		908	1.7	
Turnout		52,719	93.7	
Two-candidate-preferred result
Labor	David Watkins	27,867	53.8	−4.3
Labor (NSW)	James Smith	23,944	46.2	+4.3
Labor hold		Swing	−4.3	
