= David Watkins (Australian politician) =

Australian politician (1865–1935)

The Honourable David Watkins
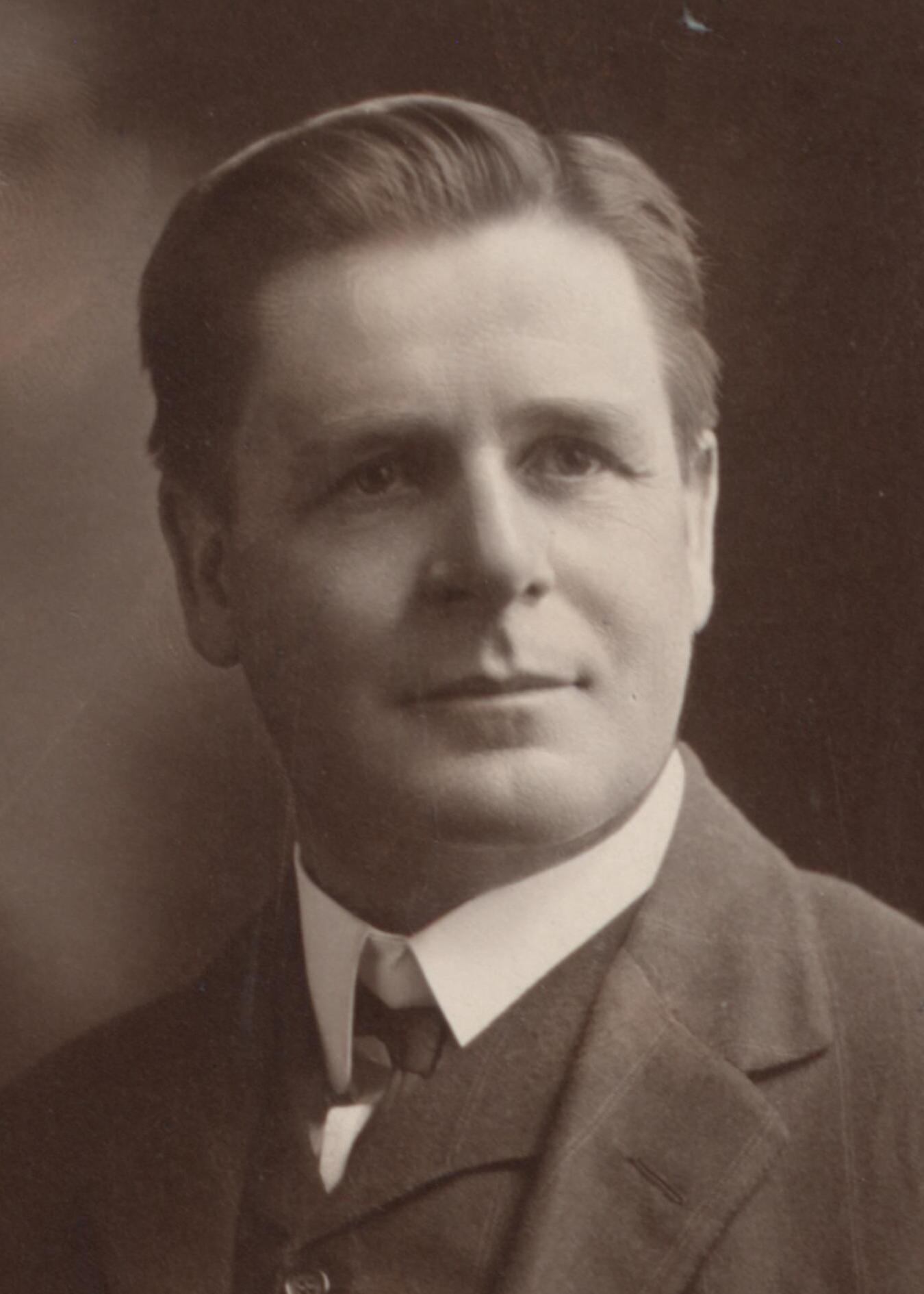
- Watkins in 1908

Member of the Australian Parliament for Newcastle
- In office 29 March 1901 – 8 April 1935
- Preceded by: New seat
- Succeeded by: David Watkins

Personal details
- Born: 5 May 1865 Wallsend, New South Wales, Australia
- Died: 8 April 1935 (aged 69) Waratah, New South Wales, Australia
- Party: Australian Labor Party
- Spouse: Marion
- Children: David Oliver Watkins
- Occupation: Coal miner, unionist

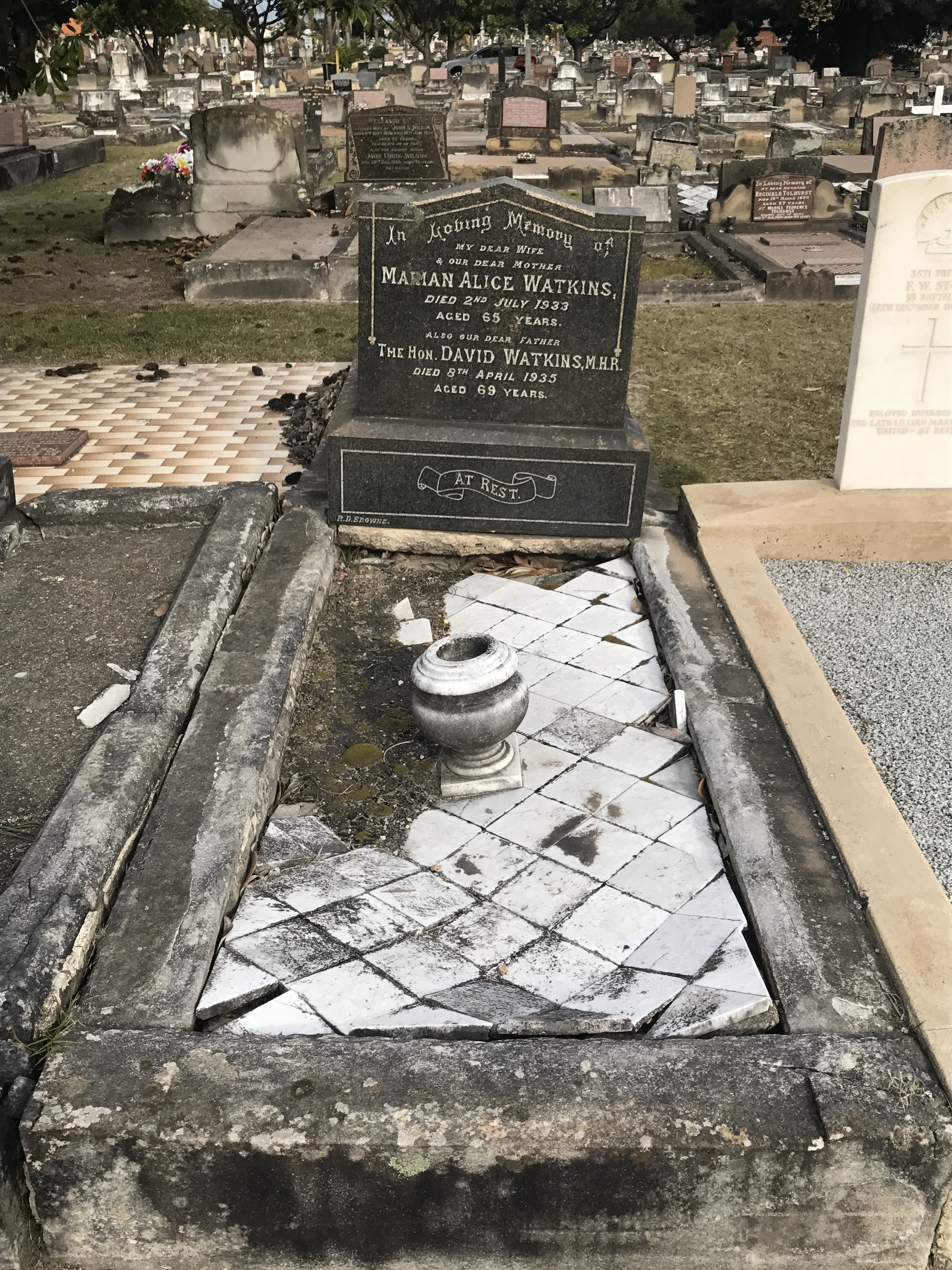
Watkins grave at Sandgate Cemetery

David Watkins (5 May 1865 – 8 April 1935) was an Australian politician. He was an Australian Labor Party member of the New South Wales Legislative Assembly for Wallsend from 1894 until 1901. At Federation, he was elected to the new Australian House of Representatives as the Labor member for Newcastle and served until his death in 1935. Watkins' death left former Prime Minister Billy Hughes as the only remaining member of the First Parliament still in the House.

== Early life and career ==
Watkins was born in Wallsend, New South Wales, the third son of Welsh immigrants John Watkins, a miner, and his wife Mary Ann, née Hopkins. He was educated at Wallsend Public School, but left school at thirteen. He worked in the Wallsend office of the Newcastle Morning Herald for two years, then worked for W. J. Johnson getting timber for the Wallsend Colliery. He went to work for the Wallsend Colliery directly in 1882, first as a water baler and wheeler, and then from 1884 as a miner. He was secretary of the Wallsend Lodge of the Miners' Union in from 1891 until his election to state parliament. As Wallsend secretary, Watkins, along with the union's general secretary, conducted and won an influential case about pay rates for certain types of coal seams (known as the "jerry case") that resulted in Wallsend workers receiving three years' backpay. Watkins was a member of the committee of management of the Wallsend Mining District Hospital and was heavily involved with the Wallsend and Plattsburg Musical and Literary Society and Wallsend Choral Society.

== Colonial politics ==
He was elected to the Legislative Assembly for the Labor Party at the 1894 election as one of the first pledged Labor MPs, winning the new seat of Wallsend by defeating incumbent Protectionist MP for Northumberland Thomas Walker. In his first term, Watkins was part of a 14-member Labor crossbench caucus that agreed to support the government of George Reid in exchange for the passage of the landmark Coal Mines Regulation Act 1896 to reform working conditions for coal miners, alongside an unsuccessful push to change land tax legislation; he also gave evidence to a Royal Commission into the coal mining bill prior to its passage. Later, in 1899, after a dispute about tariffs and the introduction of an old-age pension, the protectionist Watkins played a critical role in convincing Labor to bring down the Reid government and install William Lyne as Premier. In 1900, while a serving state MP, he was elected president of the Australian Labour Federation, in which capacity he was involved in settling several industrial disputes.

== Federal politics ==
At the inaugural 1901 federal election following Federation, Watkins switched to federal politics, winning the Australian House of Representatives seat of Newcastle for Labor and easily defeating Free Trade Party candidate Owen Gilbert.

In 1902–04, Watkins was a member of the Royal Commission on the Bonuses for Manufactures Bill, which investigated the practicality of beginning iron works in Australia and possible industry incentives. In 1910, he was chairman of a parliamentary that visited the Territory of Papua to investigate issues around cheap imported labour and recommended that imported labour in Papua cease and local Papuan workers be employed instead. In 1916, he was chairman of the Australian section of the Empire War Delegation that visited England along with representatives of other Commonwealth dominions, and toured the Western Front. Watkins was never appointed to ministerial office, but was party whip in both government and opposition from 1909 to 1914 and secretary of the parliamentary party from 1908 to 1916. He was temporary chairman of committees from 1920 to 1928.

Watkins sided with Prime Minister James Scullin in the 1931 Labor split which saw the New South Wales branch expelled from the federal party and most of the New South Wales MPs sit separately in federal parliament as the Australian Labor Party (NSW) (Lang Labor); he remained in the federal Labor caucus and was expelled from the state branch as a result. He was bitterly opposed by Lang Labor candidates at his last two elections in 1931 and 1934 as a consequence of the split.

Watkins died of cancer at the Newcastle Mater Misericordiae Hospital on 8 April 1935 while still a sitting MP, aged 69. He was granted a state funeral and was buried at Sandgate Cemetery. He had been an MP for over forty years of continuous service which he remained undefeated. He left an estate of £2,211. His second son, David Oliver Watkins, stood for his seat in parliament at the resulting by-election, which he won on a reduced margin and held for 23 years.

He married Marion Alice (née Arthur) with Wesleyan forms on 30 July 1890. She predeceased him in 1933. They had three daughters and five sons.

New South Wales Legislative Assembly
| Preceded by New seat | Member for Wallsend; 1894–1901 | Succeeded by John Estell |
Parliament of Australia
| New division | Member for Newcastle; 1901–1935 | Succeeded by David Oliver Watkins |
