= Sharon Claydon =

Australian politician

The Honourable Sharon Claydon MP

Deputy Speaker of the Australian House of Representatives
- Incumbent
- Assumed office 26 July 2022
- Preceded by: Llew O'Brien

Member of the Australian Parliament for Newcastle
- Incumbent
- Assumed office 7 September 2013
- Preceded by: Sharon Grierson

Personal details
- Born: 26 April 1964 (age 62) Camperdown, New South Wales, Australia
- Party: Labor
- Education: Lambton High School
- Alma mater: University of Sydney, BA (Hons)
- Occupation: Anthropologist; Social Worker; Politician
- Website: www.sharonclaydon.com

Sharon Catherine Claydon (born 26 April 1964) is an Australian politician serving as the 33rd Deputy Speaker of the Australian House of Representatives since 2022. A member of the Labor Party, she represents the New South Wales Division of Newcastle in the Australian House of Representatives since the 2013 election.

== Early life ==
Claydon was born on 26 April 1964 in Camperdown, New South Wales. Her father Kevin was an Australian Army soldier and she first attended school at Holsworthy Barracks. He left the army shortly after completing a tour of duty in Vietnam in 1970. The family subsequently lived in Bermagui for several years where she learned to ride horses, later moving to the Newcastle suburb of New Lambton Heights where she attended Lambton High School.

After leaving school, Claydon enrolled at the University of Sydney as an arts and law student. She left after two years to return to Newcastle, where through a job centre she found work at Helen Springs Station in the Northern Territory. She was recruited as a gardener but later worked as a jillaroo and camp cook. After a few years, Claydon returned to New South Wales, where she worked for a disability service provider on the South Coast. She later returned to university and completed an honours degree majoring in anthropology. She subsequently began a PhD thesis on "contemporary political representation in the Bunuba Aboriginal community", moving to Fitzroy Crossing, Western Australia. She worked in remote Aboriginal communities "for the best part of decade" before returning to Newcastle.

== Politics ==
Claydon joined the ALP in 1999 and worked as an electorate officer for federal MPs Allan Morris and Sharon Grierson. She was a state conference delegate from 2002 and a national conference delegate from 2007. She also served on the state administrative committee and was a member of the national policy forum. In 2008, she was elected to the Newcastle City Council.

In July 2012, Claydon announced she would run for ALP preselection in the seat of Newcastle following the retirement of Sharon Grierson. At the time she was described by the Newcastle Herald as "a popular figure in the local branches, particularly in the party's left faction, and is well connected with the ALP hierarchy after serving for several years on the powerful NSW Labor administrative committee". She was elected to the House of Representatives at the 2013 federal election.

Claydon has been on the speaker's panel since 2015. She has also been deputy chair of the joint select committee into the National Redress Scheme and the House standing committee on social policy and legal affairs. In this role, she has been an advocate for victims of institutional abuse, raising awareness that as of early 2021, only 51 people had received compensation payouts out of 2728 applications. She is a member of the Labor Left faction.

On 26 July 2022, following the ALP's victory at the 2022 election, Claydon was chosen as the party's nominee for Deputy Speaker of the House of Representatives. She was re-elected to this position on 22 July 2025, during the sitting of the 48th Parliament.

== Personal ==
Claydon is currently a patron of the Stockton Historical Society and has served as treasurer of the Newcastle Aboriginal Support Group.

Parliament of Australia
Preceded by Sharon Grierson	Member for Newcastle; 2013–present	Incumbent
Preceded by Llew O'Brien	Deputy Speaker of the House of Representatives; 2022-present	Incumbent
