= Charles Jones (Australian politician) =

Australian politician and government minister

The Honourable Charles Jones AO
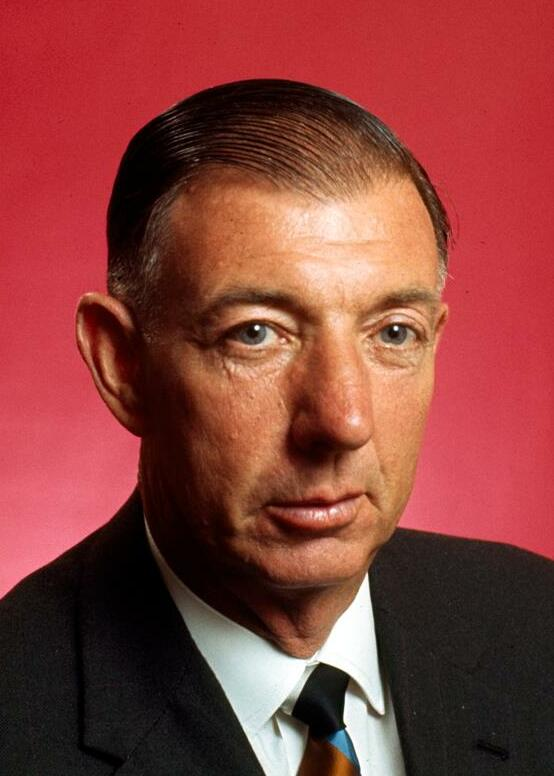
- Jones in 1973

Member of the Australian Parliament for Newcastle
- In office 22 November 1958 – 4 February 1983
- Preceded by: David Watkins
- Succeeded by: Allan Morris

Personal details
- Born: 12 September 1917 Newcastle, New South Wales
- Died: 7 August 2003 (aged 85)
- Party: Australian Labor Party
- Spouse: Doreen Wright
- Relations: Sam Jones (brother)
- Occupation: Boilermaker

Charles Keith Jones AO (12 September 1917 – 7 August 2003) was an Australian politician and government minister.

He was Minister for Transport (19 December 1972 – 12 June 1974) and Minister for Civil Aviation (19 December 1972 – 30 November 1973) in the Second Whitlam ministry and Minister for Transport (12 June 1974 – 11 November 1975) in the Third Whitlam ministry.

== Biography ==
Commonly known as "Charlie", Jones was born in Newcastle and was educated at Cooks Hill High School to the equivalent of 7th grade. He then completed an apprenticeship in boilermaking at the BHP's Newcastle Steelworks and Newcastle Technical College. In 1939 he married Doreen Wright.

Jones first became politically active as a member of the Boilermakers Union and, subsequently, the various metal trade unions. In the early 1940s he became a union official and a delegate to the Newcastle Trades Hall Council.

In 1946, Jones was elected to the Newcastle City Council. Ten years later, at the age of 39, he became the youngest-ever Lord Mayor of Newcastle, a position he held until he was elected to the Division of Newcastle at the 1958 election. He held the seat until he retired in 1983.

In the Federal Australian Labor Party, Jones was associated with the Left faction, and was a close associate of Jim Cairns and Tom Uren. He became the shadow minister for Transport and Civil Aviation following Labor's crushing defeat at the 1966 election.

Jones was commissioned as a minister with the election of the Whitlam government in 1972 and served as the Minister for Transport until that government was dismissed on 11 November 1975. Despite Newcastle's status as a Labor bastion (it has been in Labor hands since Federation), Jones is the only person in the seat's history to have been promoted to cabinet.

During this period, Jones attempted to improve the co-ordination of Australia's transport systems. Under the Australian constitution, intrastate transport is a responsibility of the various state governments. Consequently, Australian transport had a significant degree of systemic inefficiency. Jones proposed a model urban train carriage that could be used in the train systems of the major capitals and also attempted to inaugurate an Inter-State Commission as proposed by Section 101 of the Australian Constitution.

In addition, Jones was involved in providing air services to Papua New Guinea when that nation became independent in 1975. After he had left the federal parliament, he was appointed an Officer of the Order of Australia for service to politics and government in the 1984 Australia Day Honours list. In 2001 he was presented with a Centenary Medal for service to the Australian community.

Political offices
Preceded by Gough Whitlam	Minister for Transport; 1972–1975	Succeeded by Peter Nixon
Preceded by Gough Whitlam	Minister for Civil Aviation; 1972–1973	Absorbed into Transport portfolio
Parliament of Australia
Preceded by David Oliver Watkins	Member for Newcastle; 1958–1983	Succeeded by Allan Morris
