= Sharon Grierson =

Australian politician

Member of the Australian Parliament for Newcastle
- In office 10 November 2001 – 5 August 2013
- Preceded by: Allan Morris
- Succeeded by: Sharon Claydon

Personal details
- Born: 4 May 1951 (age 74) Newcastle, New South Wales, Australia
- Party: Australian Labor Party
- Occupation: Teacher; Politician

Sharon Joy Grierson (born 4 May 1951 in Newcastle, New South Wales) was educated at Newcastle Teachers College, and worked as a teacher and school principal before entering politics.

Grierson became a member of the Australian Labor Party, and was elected to the Australian House of Representatives in November 2001, representing the Division of Newcastle. She was re-elected in 2004, 2007 and 2010.

However, in July 2012, Grierson announced she would not seek re-election in 2013, citing the need to attend to family and personal health problems.

She has been the only Labor MP to sign the Australian Marriage Equality Charter, and voted in favour of legislation to legalise same-sex marriage in Australia when it was presented in parliament. She also chaired the Public Accounts and Audit Committee.

She was co-convenor of the Parliamentary Friends of Dementia, a parliamentary friendship group that advocates for Australians living with dementia, their families and carers.

Parliament of Australia
Preceded by Allan Morris	Member for Newcastle; 2001–2013	Succeeded by Sharon Claydon
