= Wallsend, New South Wales =

Wallsend
- Suburb
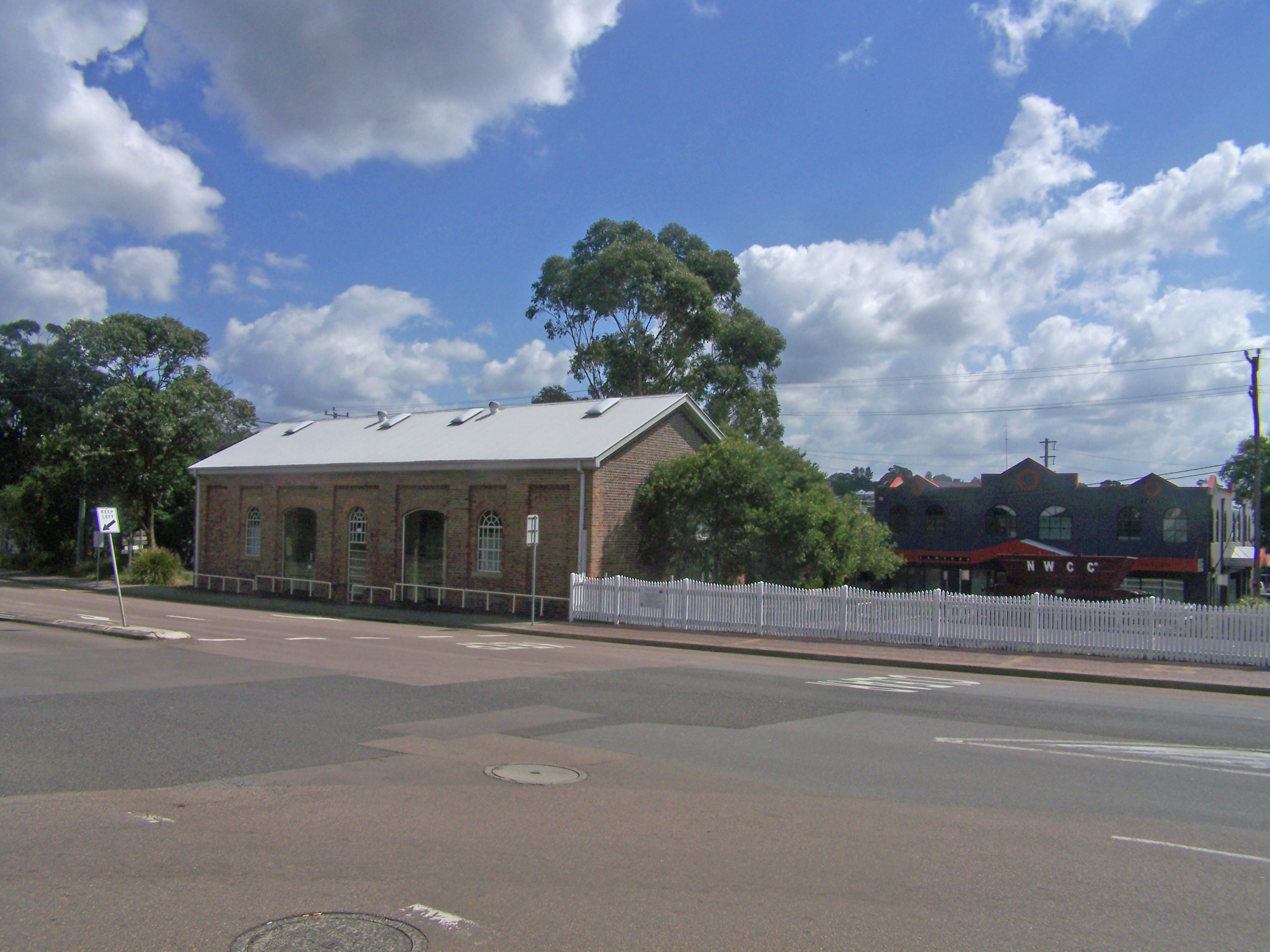
- Railway Goods Shed building (1860s and 1870s).

- Interactive map of Wallsend
- Coordinates: 32°53′53″S 151°40′05″E
- Country: Australia
- State: New South Wales
- City: Newcastle
- LGA: City of Newcastle
- Location: 11 km (6.8 mi) WNW of Newcastle; 150 km (93 mi) N of Sydney; 31 km (19 mi) SE of Maitland; 63 km (39 mi) N of The Entrance; 80 km (50 mi) N of Gosford

Government
  - State electorate: Wallsend
  - Federal division: Newcastle

Area
  - Total: 12.2 km^{2} (4.7 sq mi)
- Elevation: 9 m (30 ft)

Population
  - Total: 13,244 (2021 census)
  - Density: 1,086/km^{2} (2,812/sq mi)
- Postcode: 2287
- Parish: Kahibah
Suburbs around Wallsend
Fletcher	Maryland	Birmingham Gardens
Minmi	Wallsend	Jesmond
Edgeworth	Elermore Vale	Lambton

Wallsend is a western suburb of Newcastle, New South Wales, Australia, 11 kilometres (6.8 mi) from Newcastle's central business district. It is part of the local government areas.

== History ==
The Awabakal and Worimi peoples are acknowledged by City of Newcastle as the traditional custodians of the land situated within the Newcastle local government area, including wetlands, rivers, creeks, and coastal environments. It is known that their heritage and cultural ties to Newcastle date back tens of thousands of years.

Lieutenant Edward Close, an engineer and founder of Morpeth, recorded that part of the Wallsend area was called Barrahinebin by the Aboriginal custodians. Close reported that Barrahinebin was used to describe the area bounded by the Hunter River, Ironbark Creek and Mount Sugarloaf.

Wallsend was named after a North of England coal mining township, initially built at the end of a Roman defensive wall, a town to the east of Newcastle upon Tyne. The name was given to the area by Alexander Brown in the 1850s when he purchased land bounded by what are now Newcastle Road, Boundary, and Croudace Streets and beyond Gunambi Road. The company he formed to operate the colliery which opened in January 1861 was called the Newcastle-Wallsend Coal Company.

The suburb began as two mining towns, Wallsend and Plattsburg. Wallsend was the more developed and as it grew it linked to Plattsburg via Nelson Street. Wallsend was proclaimed a separate municipality in early 1874, but the two areas had re-joined by 1915. The coal mined at Wallsend was of very good quality and the township prospered, creating the commercial hub it is today.

== Modern day Wallsend ==
Today Wallsend has outgrown the historic main street and received investment and expansion from local business and national companies. The main street of Wallsend has also experienced new restaurants and real estate agencies, as well as home building companies occupying previous local businesses that have migrated to the larger Wallsend Village shopping centre (formerly owned by Stockland).

View of Wallsend Village shopping centre from the stairs of Wallsend Library in 2026.

The Wallsend Library, a branch of Newcastle Libraries, was originally opened in 1948. The new, much larger, library building was opened in 2006.

== Education ==
Plattsburg Public School is a government co-educational school located on Ranclaud Street.

There is another co-educational government primary school called Wallsend Public School located on 26 Martindale Street.

There is also a Catholic co-educational primary school called St Patrick's Primary School located on Macquarie Street.

Callaghan College Wallsend Campus is a Years 7–10 co-educational government high school located on Macquarie Street.

== Notable people ==
- William Currey, Australian soldier and politician who received the Victoria Cross for his actions at the Battle of Mont Saint-Quentin during WWI
- Clarence Jeffries, Australian WWI soldier and Victoria Cross recipient, killed in action during the Battle of Passchendaele
- David Watkins, Labor politician, coal miner and unionist. He represented Wallsend in the NSW Parliament and later Newcastle in the Australian House of Representatives, serving continuously from Federation until his death
- Sonia Hornery, current NSW Labor politician representing Wallsend and Deputy Speaker of the NSW Legislative Assembly since 2023
- Jack Hughes, professional footballer

== Notable events ==
On the 1st of March 2026, a small freshwater crocodile was found and successfully captured from Ironbark Creek.

== Heritage listings ==
Wallsend has one NSW heritage-listed site:

- 76 Cowper Street: Wallsend Railway Goods Shed

== Sports ==
- Wallsend Racecourse
- Fletcher Football Club
- Wallsend Athletics Club
- Wallsend Touch Football Association

== Notable people ==
- Alexander Alam (1896-1983), businessman and politician
- William Brennan (1863-1937), politician
- William Currey (1895-1938), politician and Victoria Cross recipient
- Sonia Hornery (born 1961), politician
- Jack Hughes, footballer
- Clarence Jeffries (1894-1917), soldier and Victoria Cross recipient
- John Morris (1936-2013), politician
- David Watkins (1865-1935), politician
