= Division of Newcastle =

Australian federal electoral division

Coordinates: 32.841°S 151.753°E

Newcastle Australian House of Representatives Division
- Interactive map of electorate boundaries
- Created: 1901
- MP: Sharon Claydon
- Party: Labor
- Namesake: Newcastle
- Electors: 126,289 (2025)
- Area: 159 km^{2} (61.4 sq mi)
- Demographic: Provincial
Electorates around Newcastle:
Paterson	Paterson	Paterson
Paterson	Newcastle	South Pacific Ocean
Hunter	Shortland	South Pacific Ocean

The Division of Newcastle is an Australian electoral division in the state of New South Wales.

== Geography ==
Since 1984, federal electoral division boundaries in Australia have been determined at redistributions by a redistribution committee appointed by the Australian Electoral Commission. Redistributions occur for the boundaries of divisions in a particular state, and they occur every seven years, or sooner if a state's representation entitlement changes or when divisions of a state are malapportioned.

== History ==
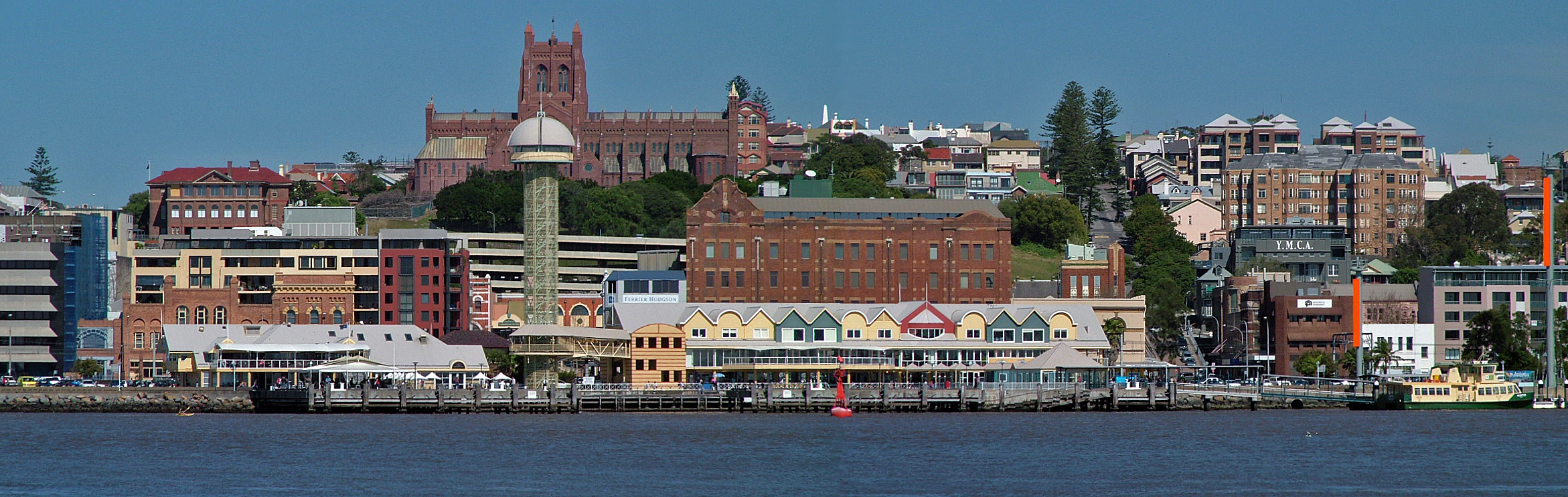
The city of Newcastle, the division's namesake

The division was proclaimed in 1900, and was one of the original 65 divisions to be contested at the first federal election. The division was named after the city of Newcastle, around which the division is centred.

It has been held by the Australian Labor Party for its entire existence. Historically, it has been one of that party's safest seats outside of the capital cities; the Hunter Region is one of the few regions outside the capitals where Labor consistently does well. Labor has never tallied less than 58 percent of the Two-party-preferred vote in a general election, and has only come close to losing it once, when it tallied 53 percent in a 1935 by-election, when the top two candidates were representing Labor and Labor (NSW). It is the only original division to be held by just one party since the first federal election.

The Division of Newcastle has had just six members since 1901, the fewest of any of the original divisions. From 1901 to 1958, the seat was held by the Watkins family. The seat's first member, David Watkins, held the seat until his death in 1935. The ensuing by-election was won by his son, David Oliver. Allan Morris' brother Peter Morris was also a Member of the House, holding the Division of Shortland, which lies immediately to the south. Charles Jones' brother Sam was the member for Waratah in the New South Wales Legislative Assembly for much of the time that he was the member. The electoral district of Waratah lay within the boundaries of the Division of Newcastle.

The seat's most prominent members were David Watkins, the second-longest serving member of the First Parliament, and Charles Jones, a minister in the Whitlam government. The current Member, since the 2013 federal election, is Sharon Claydon.

Following the 2022 Australian federal election, the division was the safest Labor seat in the nation.

== Members ==
Image	Member	Party	Term	Notes
	David Watkins (1865–1935)	Labor	29 March 1901 – 8 April 1935	Previously held the New South Wales Legislative Assembly seat of Wallsend. Served as Chief Government Whip in the House under Fisher. Died in office. Succeeded by his son
	David Oliver Watkins (1896–1971)	Labor	1 June 1935 – 14 October 1958	Retired. Preceded by his father
	Charles Jones (1917–2003)	Labor	22 November 1958 – 4 February 1983	Served as minister under Whitlam. Retired
	Allan Morris (1940–)	Labor	5 March 1983 – 8 October 2001	Retired
	Sharon Grierson (1951–)	Labor	10 November 2001 – 5 August 2013	Retired
	Sharon Claydon (1964–)	Labor	7 September 2013 – present	Incumbent. Current Deputy Speaker of the Australian House of Representatives.

== Election results ==
2025 Australian federal election: Newcastle
Party	Candidate	Votes	%	±%
Labor	Sharon Claydon	49,054	45.31	+1.25
Greens	Charlotte McCabe	24,061	22.22	+2.21
Liberal	Asarri McPhee	20,638	19.06	−5.23
One Nation	Phillip Heyne	5,789	5.35	+0.83
Trumpet of Patriots	Jennifer Stefanac	3,861	3.57	+2.53
Family First	Jason Briggs	2,319	2.14	+2.14
Socialist Alliance	Steve O'Brien	1,656	1.53	+1.53
	Robert Creech	888	0.82	+0.82
Total formal votes		108,266	93.00	−1.57
Informal votes		8,145	7.00	+1.57
Turnout		116,411	92.22	+1.52
Notional two-party-preferred count
Labor	Sharon Claydon	76,644	70.79	+2.85
Liberal	Asarri McPhee	31,622	29.21	−2.85
Two-candidate-preferred result
Labor	Sharon Claydon	71,244	65.80	−2.14
Greens	Charlotte McCabe	37,022	34.20	+34.20
Labor hold		Swing	–2.14	

2022 Australian federal election: Newcastle
Party	Candidate	Votes	%	±%
Labor	Sharon Claydon	46,551	44.07	−1.66
Liberal	Katrina Wark	25,816	24.44	−4.77
Greens	Charlotte McCabe	21,195	20.07	+4.51
One Nation	Mark Watson	4,757	4.50	+4.50
Animal Justice	Emily Brollo	2,549	2.41	−0.79
United Australia	Amanda Cook	2,517	2.38	−0.99
Informed Medical Options	William Hussey	1,140	1.08	+1.08
Federation	Garth Pywell	1,102	1.04	+1.04
Total formal votes		105,627	94.59	+0.10
Informal votes		6,038	5.41	−0.10
Turnout		111,665	91.19	−1.53
Two-party-preferred result
Labor	Sharon Claydon	71,807	67.98	+4.15
Liberal	Katrina Wark	33,820	32.02	−4.15
Labor hold		Swing	+4.15	

Alluvial diagram for preference flows in the seat of Newcastle in the 2022 federal election. indicates at what stage the winning candidate had over 50% of the votes and was declared the winner.
