= Allan Morris =

Australian politician (born 1940)

Member of the Australian Parliament for Newcastle
- In office 5 March 1983 – 8 October 2001
- Preceded by: Charles Jones
- Succeeded by: Sharon Grierson

Personal details
- Born: 26 July 1940 (age 86) Waratah, New South Wales, Australia
- Party: Labor (to 2007)
- Relations: Peter Morris (brother); Matthew Morris (nephew)
- Education: University of Newcastle
- Occupation: Computer programmer

Allan Agapitos Morris (born 26 July 1940) is an Australian former politician. He was a member of the House of Representatives from 1983 to 2001, representing the seat of Newcastle for the Australian Labor Party (ALP). He also served on the Newcastle City Council from 1974 to 1983. He was expelled from the ALP in 2007.

== Early life ==
Morris was born on 26 July 1940 in Waratah, New South Wales. He and his older brother Peter Morris – also a federal MP – were the sons of Jimmy Morris, a Greek immigrant from the island of Symi who anglicised his name from Agapitos Montiadis and ran a coffeehouse in Newcastle, New South Wales.

Morris holds the degree of Bachelor of Arts from the University of Newcastle. Prior to entering politics, he was a computer programmer and analyst. He was an alderman on Newcastle City Council from 1974 to 1983 and also a councillor on electricity provider Shortland County Council from 1974 to 1977.

== Politics ==
=== Early involvement ===
Morris was secretary of the ALP's Newcastle branch from 1973 to 1982. He was a delegate to the party's state council and state conference from 1975 and served as the party's campaign director for the federal Division of Newcastle at the 1975 federal election.

=== House of Representatives ===
At the 1983 election, Morris was elected to the House of Representatives, retaining the seat of Newcastle for the ALP following the retirement of incumbent MP Charles Jones. He was re-elected on six further occasions (including at a supplementary election following the death of a candidate at the 1998 election), eventually retiring prior to the 2001 election.

In parliament, Morris served as chair of the House Standing Committee on Community Affairs from 1993 to 1996 and as deputy chair of the House Standing Committee on Industry, Science and Resources from 1998 to 2001. He was factionally unaligned within the ALP and came into conflict with the Hawke government on several occasions, including on changes to the assets test for pensions and the Bell Group's 1986 takeover bid for BHP. In 1990, he publicly criticised the government's decision to renege on an election promise to relocate the Australian Maritime Safety Authority from Canberra to Newcastle.

=== Later activities ===
In 2006, Morris publicly opposed the ALP's decision to disendorse incumbent Newcastle state MP Bryce Gaudry, with his letters to federal Labor leader Kim Beazley on the matter published in The Sydney Morning Herald. Prior to the 2007 New South Wales state election, he announced he would support Gaudry's bid for re-election as an independent. He was subsequently expelled from the party.

Parliament of Australia
Preceded by Charles Jones	Member for Newcastle; 1983–2001	Succeeded by Sharon Grierson
