= Electoral results for the Division of Fowler =

Australian division election results

This is a list of electoral results for the Division of Fowler in Australian federal elections from the electorate's creation in 1984 until the present.

== Members ==
Member	Party	Term
Ted Grace	Labor	1984–1998
Julia Irwin	Labor	1998–2010
Chris Hayes	Labor	2010–2022
Dai Le	Independent	2022–present

== Election results ==
=== Elections in the 2020s ===
==== 2025 ====
2025 Australian federal election: Fowler
Party	Candidate	Votes	%	±%
Family First	Jared Athavle			
Libertarian	Victor Tey			
Independent	Dai Le			
Greens	Avery Jacob Howard			
One Nation	Tony Margos			
Labor	Tu Le			
Liberal	Vivek Singha			
Total formal votes				
Informal votes				
Turnout				

==== 2022 ====
2022 Australian federal election: Fowler
Party	Candidate	Votes	%	±%
Labor	Kristina Keneally	30,973	36.06	−18.48
Independent	Dai Le	25,346	29.51	+29.51
Liberal	Courtney Nguyen	14,740	17.16	−12.89
United Australia	Lela Panich	5,512	6.42	+2.09
Greens	Avery Howard	4,191	4.88	−0.66
One Nation	Tony Margos	3,047	3.55	+3.55
Liberal Democrats	Peter Runge	2,094	2.44	+2.44
Total formal votes		85,903	89.48	+2.59
Informal votes		10,098	10.52	−2.59
Turnout		96,001	88.54	−1.50
Notional two-party-preferred count
Labor	Kristina Keneally	47,864	55.72	–8.27
Liberal	Courtney Nguyen	38,039	44.28	+8.27
Two-candidate-preferred result
Independent	Dai Le	44,348	51.63	+51.63
Labor	Kristina Keneally	41,555	48.37	−15.62
Independent gain from Labor				

Alluvial diagram for preference flows in the seat of Fowler in the 2022 federal election. indicates at what stage the winning candidate had over 50% of the votes and was declared the winner.

=== Elections in the 2010s ===
==== 2019 ====
2019 Australian federal election: Fowler
Party	Candidate	Votes	%	±%
Labor	Chris Hayes	45,627	54.54	−6.28
Liberal	Wayne Blewitt	25,137	30.05	+4.32
Christian Democrats	Francesca Mocanu	4,643	5.55	−0.10
Greens	Seamus Lee	4,633	5.54	−0.67
United Australia	Joshua Jabbour	3,624	4.33	+4.33
Total formal votes		83,664	86.89	−2.70
Informal votes		12,624	13.11	+2.70
Turnout		96,288	90.04	+0.31
Two-party-preferred result
Labor	Chris Hayes	53,540	63.99	−3.50
Liberal	Wayne Blewitt	30,124	36.01	+3.50
Labor hold		Swing	−3.50	

==== 2016 ====
2016 Australian federal election: Fowler
Party	Candidate	Votes	%	±%
Labor	Chris Hayes	51,559	60.82	+3.80
Liberal	Adam Farhan	21,812	25.73	−5.77
Greens	Bill Cashman	5,264	6.21	+2.86
Christian Democrats	Craig Hall	4,792	5.65	+1.86
Smokers Rights	Joaquim de Lima	1,343	1.58	+1.58
Total formal votes		84,770	89.59	+3.14
Informal votes		9,850	10.41	−3.14
Turnout		94,620	89.73	−3.01
Two-party-preferred result
Labor	Chris Hayes	57,209	67.49	+4.60
Liberal	Adam Farhan	27,561	32.51	−4.60
Labor hold		Swing	+4.60	

==== 2013 ====
2013 Australian federal election: Fowler
Party	Candidate	Votes	%	±%
Labor	Chris Hayes	47,772	60.76	+7.90
Liberal	Andrew Nguyen	21,043	26.76	−10.18
Christian Democrats	Matt Attia	3,559	4.53	+4.53
Palmer United	Bradley Pastoors	2,722	3.46	+3.46
Greens	Benjamin Silaphet	2,684	3.41	−3.28
Katter's Australian	Darren McLean	848	1.08	+1.08
Total formal votes		78,628	86.07	−1.10
Informal votes		12,728	13.93	+1.10
Turnout		91,356	92.16	−0.13
Two-party-preferred result
Labor	Chris Hayes	52,526	66.80	+8.04
Liberal	Andrew Nguyen	26,102	33.20	−8.04
Labor hold		Swing	+8.04	

==== 2010 ====
2010 Australian federal election: Fowler
Party	Candidate	Votes	%	±%
Labor	Chris Hayes	40,636	52.86	−15.06
Liberal	Thomas Dang	28,402	36.94	+14.10
Greens	Signe Westerberg	5,144	6.69	+0.73
Socialist Equality	Mike Head	2,700	3.51	+3.51
Total formal votes		76,882	87.17	−4.35
Informal votes		11,314	12.83	+4.35
Turnout		88,196	92.29	−1.05
Two-party-preferred result
Labor	Chris Hayes	45,178	58.76	−13.81
Liberal	Thomas Dang	31,704	41.24	+13.81
Labor hold		Swing	−13.81	

=== Elections in the 2000s ===
==== 2007 ====
2007 Australian federal election: Fowler
Party	Candidate	Votes	%	±%
Labor	Julia Irwin	50,180	64.25	+8.54
Liberal	Rose Torossian	21,706	27.79	−5.07
Greens	Vlaudin Vega	4,278	5.49	−0.10
Christian Democrats	Paul Termeulen	1,932	2.47	+1.78
Total formal votes		78,107	92.33	+1.20
Informal votes		6,490	7.67	−1.20
Turnout		84,597	94.88	+0.75
Two-party-preferred result
Labor	Julia Irwin	53,306	68.25	+4.93
Liberal	Rose Torossian	24,801	31.75	−4.93
Labor hold		Swing	+4.93	

==== 2004 ====
2004 Australian federal election: Fowler
Party	Candidate	Votes	%	±%
Labor	Julia Irwin	44,141	62.78	+2.08
Liberal	Philip Powrie	18,253	25.96	+7.92
Greens	Pauline Tyrrell	5,164	7.34	+4.89
Independent	Jose Nunez	1,594	2.27	+2.27
Citizens Electoral Council	Hal Johnson	1,162	1.65	−1.56
Total formal votes		70,314	90.89	+3.64
Informal votes		7,048	9.11	−3.64
Turnout		77,362	93.34	−0.01
Two-party-preferred result
Labor	Julia Irwin	50,174	71.36	−0.13
Liberal	Philip Powrie	20,140	28.64	+0.13
Labor hold		Swing	−0.13	

==== 2001 ====
2001 Australian federal election: Fowler
Party	Candidate	Votes	%	±%
Labor	Julia Irwin	40,904	60.70	−1.61
Liberal	Glenn Watson	12,154	18.04	+1.83
Unity	Steve Chung	3,476	5.16	−5.81
One Nation	Oscar Rosso	2,357	3.50	−3.70
Citizens Electoral Council	Hal Johnson	2,166	3.21	+3.21
Greens	Lee Grant	1,654	2.45	+2.35
No GST	Robin Gaskell	1,395	2.07	+2.07
Democrats	David Mendelssohn	1,320	1.96	−1.22
Christian Democrats	Manny Poularas	1,110	1.65	+1.65
Against Further Immigration	Max Brazenall	853	1.27	+1.27
Total formal votes		67,389	87.29	−6.92
Informal votes		9,816	12.71	+6.92
Turnout		77,205	93.74	
Two-party-preferred result
Labor	Julia Irwin	48,174	71.50	−4.49
Liberal	Glenn Watson	19,215	28.50	+4.49
Labor hold		Swing	−4.49	

=== Elections in the 1990s ===
==== 1998 ====
1998 Australian federal election: Fowler
Party	Candidate	Votes	%	±%
Labor	Julia Irwin	49,472	61.69	+0.63
Liberal	Lorna Doona	13,705	17.09	−9.31
Unity	Andrew Su	8,532	10.64	+10.64
One Nation	Rodney Smith	5,886	7.34	+7.34
Democrats	Mark Stevens	2,603	3.25	−4.12
Total formal votes		80,198	94.22	+2.29
Informal votes		4,920	5.78	−2.29
Turnout		85,118	93.93	−1.93
Two-party-preferred result
Labor	Julia Irwin	61,216	76.33	+8.06
Liberal	Lorna Doona	18,982	23.67	−8.06
Labor hold		Swing	+8.06	

==== 1996 ====
1996 Australian federal election: Fowler
Party	Candidate	Votes	%	±%
Labor	Ted Grace	45,408	61.06	−7.75
Liberal	Stephen Cenatiempo	19,630	26.40	+5.48
Democrats	Mark Stevens	5,476	7.36	+7.36
Against Further Immigration	Ken Malone	3,117	4.19	+4.19
Natural Law	Lucia van Oostveen	738	0.99	−0.21
Total formal votes		74,369	91.93	−2.87
Informal votes		6,531	8.07	+2.87
Turnout		80,900	95.86	+0.90
Two-party-preferred result
Labor	Ted Grace	50,648	68.27	−3.73
Liberal	Stephen Cenatiempo	23,544	31.73	+3.73
Labor hold		Swing	−3.73	

==== 1993 ====
1993 Australian federal election: Fowler
Party	Candidate	Votes	%	±%
Labor	Ted Grace	47,794	68.81	+8.34
Liberal	Gloria Arora	14,525	20.91	−3.73
Independent	Mark Stevens	5,014	7.22	+7.22
	Greg Josling	1,295	1.86	+1.86
Natural Law	Nicholas Hyde	832	1.20	+1.20
Total formal votes		69,460	94.80	+2.12
Informal votes		3,811	5.20	−2.12
Turnout		73,271	94.95	
Two-party-preferred result
Labor	Ted Grace	49,979	72.00	+4.20
Liberal	Gloria Arora	19,436	28.00	−4.20
Labor hold		Swing	+4.20	

==== 1990 ====
1990 Australian federal election: Fowler
Party	Candidate	Votes	%	±%
Labor	Ted Grace	35,645	56.8	−2.1
Liberal	Gloria Arora	17,424	27.8	−4.9
Democrats	Jon Phillips	4,378	7.0	−1.4
Independent	Rose-Mary Logozzo	3,077	4.9	+4.9
Independent EFF	Pam Branch	1,235	2.0	+2.0
Australian Gruen	Mirjana Ivetic-Elvy	1,026	1.6	+1.6
Total formal votes		62,785	93.2	
Informal votes		4,593	6.8	
Turnout		67,378	94.2	
Two-party-preferred result
Labor	Ted Grace	40,244	64.2	+1.8
Liberal	Gloria Arora	22,417	35.8	−1.8
Labor hold		Swing	+1.8	

=== Elections in the 1980s ===
==== 1987 ====
1987 Australian federal election: Fowler
Party	Candidate	Votes	%	±%
Labor	Ted Grace	33,563	58.9	−8.0
Liberal	Jeff Fishlock	18,639	32.7	+5.6
Democrats	Robert Neesam	4,809	8.4	+8.4
Total formal votes		57,011	90.0	
Informal votes		6,367	10.0	
Turnout		63,378	94.7	
Two-party-preferred result
Labor	Ted Grace	35,582	62.4	−7.9
Liberal	Jeff Fishlock	21,423	37.6	+7.9
Labor hold		Swing	−7.9	

==== 1984 ====
1984 Australian federal election: Fowler
Party	Candidate	Votes	%	±%
Labor	Ted Grace	34,075	66.9	+2.6
Liberal	Ken Wills	13,781	27.1	−2.0
Independent	David Bransdon	3,065	6.0	+6.0
Total formal votes		50,921	87.9	
Informal votes		7,001	12.1	
Turnout		57,922	92.4	
Two-party-preferred result
Labor	Ted Grace	35,804	70.3	+3.3
Liberal	Ken Wills	15,104	29.7	−3.3
Labor notional hold		Swing	+3.3	
