= Parachute candidate =

Term for political candidate with little connection to district

A parachute candidate, or carpetbagger in the United States, is a pejorative term for an election candidate who does not live in the area they are running to represent and has little connection to it. The allegation is thus that a desperate political party lacking reliable talent local to the district or region is "parachuting" the candidate in for the job or that the party (or the candidate themselves) wishes to give a candidate an easier election than would happen in their home area. The term also carries the implication that the candidacy has been imposed without regard to the existing local hierarchy.

== Australia ==
=== Australian Labor Party ===
Due to its factions (Labor Left, Labor Right, and Independent Labor), Labor often has arrangements in place for preselections, which would often result in parachuting candidates.

- Anthony Byrne lived outside his electorate, Holt, in the neighbouring electorate of La Trobe.
- Andrew Charlton, a former adviser to Prime Minister Kevin Rudd, was criticised for being parachuted into the Division of Parramatta to succeed retiring MP Julie Owens at the 2022 Australian federal election over local candidates who were from culturally and linguistically diverse backgrounds. Before the electoral campaign, Charlton resided in Sydney's eastern suburbs in Bellevue Hill in a property worth over $A16 million and only purchased a property in the electorate once preselected.
- Mary Doyle: At the time of her preselections, Doyle didn't live in the Division of Aston. Doyle lived in the suburb of Mitcham, located in the nearby Deakin electorate.
- Mark Dreyfus lives outside his electorate, Isaacs.
- Jane Garrett, a former minister in the First Andrews Ministry in Victoria, was parachuted into the number one position in the Eastern Victoria Region at the 2018 Victorian state election, a seat that future MP Daniel Mulino vacated to run for the Division of Fraser in Melbourne's western suburbs. Garrett had been the MP for the electoral district of Brunswick, which was becoming increasingly marginal, and was criticised for her role in a dispute between the Country Fire Authority, the United Firefighters Union, and the state government in her capacity as Minister for Emergency Services.
- In 2004, musician and activist Peter Garrett was preselected as the Australian Labor Party's candidate for the safe seat of Kingsford Smith at the federal election that year due to the intervention of leader Mark Latham, despite opposition from the local ALP branch, who labelled him an outsider. The CFMEU issued a statement criticising his selection as "a pathetic version of political celebrity squares". Regardless, Garrett was elected to the House of Representatives.
- Mathew Hilakari, Labor's candidate for the newly established electorate of Point Cook, was parachuted in for the 2022 Victorian state election. Hilakari, before pre-selection, was residing in Melbourne's southeastern suburbs in Seaford. He is also the convenor for Labor's Socialist Left faction (of which Premier Daniel Andrews is a part) in Victoria.
- Ged Kearney: As of 2018, Kearney didn't live in her electorate, Cooper at the time.
- Former Premier of New South Wales Kristina Keneally was preselected as Labor candidate for the 2017 Bennelong by-election. She lived 800 metres outside the electorate, which, combined with her high profile, attracted accusations of parachuting.
- Keneally sought preselection for the House of Representatives again in 2021, this time for the electorate of Fowler in western Sydney despite living in the city's affluent northern suburbs. She was also criticised for making the move despite retiring member Chris Hayes having already endorsed local Vietnamese Australian lawyer Tu Le as his successor in a working-class, migrant-rich neighbourhood. With heavy publicity drawn toward what is normally one of the safest seats in Australian politics, Keneally suffered a massive swing against the previous result and lost the seat for Labor for the only time in its 13-election existence, with parts of the area being held as far back as 1934 when it was part of Werriwa. This resulted in a former Liberal Party member who turned independent, Vietnamese Australian and former refugee Dai Le, being elected, and then retaining her seat in the subsequent election even with Tu Le being her main opponent.
- In 2013, Prime Minister Kevin Rudd asked Jason Yat-Sen Li to run as the Labor candidate for the seat of Bennelong at the 2013 federal election even though he did not live in the electorate. He lost the election.He would later go onto be elected for the electoral district of Strathfield at a by-election in 2022.
- In 2007, journalist Maxine McKew was preselected as Labor candidate in the forthcoming federal election for Bennelong, represented by then-Prime Minister John Howard. McKew did not live in the electorate then, and sold her home in Mosman to move before the election. She went on to defeat Howard, becoming the first candidate to unseat a sitting prime minister in an election since 1929, when Jack Holloway defeated Stanley Bruce at Flinders.
- Daniel Mulino is the current MP for the Division of Fraser in Melbourne's western suburbs. Mulino had previously been a member of the Victorian Legislative Council for the Eastern Victoria Region, a seat he vacated for Jane Garrett. Before his tenure in the Parliament of Victoria, Mulino was a councillor and mayor for the City of Casey. Mulino lived in the electorate of Fraser in the 2019 Australian federal election, in which he was elected.
- Clare O'Neil previously lived in East Melbourne, outside her electorate, Hotham, but bought a house in Oakleigh in 2020.
- In 2013, athlete Nova Peris was preselected as Labor's leading candidate for the Senate in the Northern Territory. Peris was born and raised in the Northern Territory, but her selection was received with controversy due to her celebrity status and the personal intervention of leader and Prime Minister Julia Gillard, who described the selection as a "captain's pick".
- Maria Vamvakinou: While she was MP from 2001 until 2025, she lived in Northcote, which lies outside her electorate, Calwell.

=== Coalition ===
- Despite representing Menzies for nearly thirty-one years, Kevin Andrews never lived there. He lived in neighbouring Jagajaga.
- Russell Broadbent: Broadbent while the MP for Monash, and his wife lived outside his electorate in Pakenham, Victoria, in the Division of La Trobe.
- Georgina Downer was Liberal candidate for the electorate of Mayo in the 2018 by-election. Daughter of long-serving MP for Mayo Alexander Downer, Downer had grown up in the area and proclaimed that she was "coming home" in the by-election. However, she had lived most of her life in Adelaide and Melbourne and sought preselection for a seat in the latter during the 2016 election. She lost to Centre Alliance incumbent Rebekha Sharkie.
- Eric Hutchinson did not live in his electorate, Lyons, but in neighbouring Bass.
- In 2013, Liberal National Senator Barnaby Joyce was preselected as Nationals candidate for the New South Wales seat of New England. Joyce was raised in Tamworth, within the electorate, but had lived in Queensland for over twenty years and represented the state in the Senate since 2005.
- Former President of the Australian Labor Party Warren Mundine was a parachute candidate for the Liberal Party of Australia in the Division of Gilmore at the 2019 federal election to succeed retiring MP Ann Sudmalis. Prior to Mundine's selection, the local party branches had preselected Grant Schultz, whose candidacy would eventually be overridden by the party's state executive to select Mundine instead at the request of Prime Minister Scott Morrison. Fiona Phillips of the Australian Labor Party defeated Mundine: she received a two-party swing of 3.34 per cent while Schultz contested the electorate as an independent candidate, receiving 7,585 votes.
- After the resignation of Prime Minister Malcolm Turnbull from Parliament in 2018, Dave Sharma was preselected as the Liberal candidate in the resulting by-election at Wentworth. Sharma did not live in the electorate at the time. He narrowly lost the by-election, but successfully contested the seat again several months later in the 2019 federal election. In the 2022 federal general election, Independent candidate Allegra Spender defeated Sharma.
- Brett Whiteley did not live in his electorate of Braddon during the 2016 election campaign, but in neighbouring Lyons, at Squeaking Point near Port Sorell.
- Jason Wood, the MP for La Trobe, lives with his family in Mount Dandenong, approximately 11 km outside his electorate, in the Division of Casey.

== Canada ==
Situations in which a candidate will frequently run in an area with which they do not have a connection are:

- When a party wins many seats in an election, but the party leader does not win their own seat, if the leader does not resign, a member in a safe seat may be persuaded to resign and allow the leader to run in the ensuing by-election.
- When a party elects a new leader who is not a sitting member, and the next general election is anticipated to be some years away, the leader may opt to run in a by-election that happens to occur before then, even in a district to which they have little personal connection, solely in order that the leader should have a seat and be able to participate directly in the House of Commons or legislature.
- In a district where a party has few resources and is very unlikely to win, it may field a paper candidate with no connection to the area, solely to make sure it has candidates in all districts. Usually such a candidate engages in no or very limited real campaign activities.

Depending on the circumstances, these maneuvers may attract more or less controversy.

=== Federal ===
- In the 2008 Canadian federal election, in Newfoundland and Labrador, the New Democratic Party nominated Phyllis Artiss, who lived in St. John's, for the northern riding of Labrador. Artiss was nominated in the absence of any local candidate and admitted that she found her candidacy to be not ideal: "It would be much better to have someone from Labrador who has lived there all their lives or much of their lives and worked there, and I haven't done that." Artiss was unsuccessful in her bid.
- Former Prime Minister Joe Clark, an Albertan, was seen as a parachute candidate when he ran for election in the Nova Scotia riding of Kings—Hants at a by-election in 2000. Clark had been elected leader of the Progressive Conservatives for the second time in 1998 and was seeking a seat in the House of Commons; incumbent Tory MP Scott Brison had stepped aside for Clark. He was elected, but in the 2000 federal election, he instead sought election in the Alberta riding of Calgary Centre. He won in Calgary Centre, making it the only constituency to flip to the PCs.
- Chrystia Freeland faced accusations of being a parachute candidate after the Liberal Party nominated her for the safe seat of Toronto Centre at a 2013 by-election (which its former interim leader Bob Rae had represented), as she was born in rural northern Alberta and lived in New York City at the time. She ultimately won the seat.
- Kellie Leitch was accused of being a parachute candidate when she sought the Conservative nomination in the Ontario riding of Simcoe—Grey in 2011. Leitch was born in Winnipeg and worked in Toronto at the time of her nomination. Leitch won the seat over candidates including Helena Guergis, the former Conservative Member of Parliament whom she defeated for the nomination and who ran as an independent.
- In 2021, the Conservative Party nominated Lea Mollison for the riding of Northwest Territories. Mollison was a resident of Thunder Bay, Ontario, and reportedly never visited the Northwest Territories. Mollison's campaign ignored local media requests, including an invitation to a candidates' forum, which drew widespread criticism.
- Lester B. Pearson, who was born and raised in Toronto, served as MP for Algoma East in rural Northwestern Ontario during his parliamentary career from 1948 to 1968. In his memoirs, Pearson admitted he did not have "any earlier connection" to the riding; Pearson had been seeking entry into the House of Commons, and the seat had been made vacant for him when Prime Minister William Lyon Mackenzie King recommended that its sitting member, Thomas Farquhar, be appointed to the Senate. Pearson nevertheless won election eight times before retiring from Parliament, culminating in his premiership of five years.
- After Conservative leader Pierre Poilievre was unseated in the 2025 election, Damien Kurek resigned to trigger a by-election in his safe southeastern Alberta seat in his favour.
- Jagmeet Singh, former Ontario MPP for Bramalea—Gore—Malton, faced accusations of being a parachute candidate when he stood at a by-election in Burnaby South, a riding in British Columbia. Singh had been elected leader of the NDP in 2017 but did not have a seat in the House of Commons (whereas his leadership opponents Charlie Angus, Niki Ashton, and Guy Caron were serving MPs) and stood in Burnaby South to gain one. Singh pledged to move to Burnaby if he won the by-election. Singh was ultimately successful in his bid, and held his seat in the general elections of 2019 and 2021.

=== Provincial ===
- Ernie Eves became the leader of the Ontario PCs and Premier of Ontario in 2002. He was called a parachute candidate when he ran for election in the safe Conservative seat of Dufferin—Peel—Wellington—Grey instead of a constituency in Windsor, where he was born, or Parry Sound—Muskoka, which he had represented as MPP from 1981 until 2001.
- In New Brunswick, Liberal leader Susan Holt, who became leader in 2022, was accused of being a parachute candidate when she ran in the safe Liberal constituency of Bathurst East-Nepisiguit-Saint-Isidore in a 2023 by-election instead of any riding in Fredericton, where she was born. She had placed second as the party's candidate in 2018 at Fredericton South. In 2024, Holt returned to Fredericton, winning at Fredericton South-Silverwood and becoming Premier of New Brunswick as well.
- Danielle Smith, current Premier of Alberta, was called a parachute candidate when she ran at a by-election in Brooks-Medicine Hat after winning the 2022 United Conservative Party leadership election instead of a district in Calgary, where she was born, or Highwood, where she resides and which she formerly represented as a Wildrose MLA.

=== Municipal ===
- In Ontario, Patrick Brown, who had previously been MP for Barrie and MPP for Simcoe North, was called a parachute candidate when he announced his campaign for Mayor of Brampton in 2018. Brown ultimately succeeded in his mayoral bid.

== European Parliament ==
- Sophie in 't Veld left Dutch party Democrats 66 to join Volt Europa, but she joined too late to be eligible for Volt Netherlands, so she ran for Volt Belgium instead.
- In Italy, it is quite common for party leaders to ran as lead candidates in all constituencies.
- Waldemar Herdt did not run for Alternative for Germany in the 2019 election, instead, he ran on the Centre Party list in Latvia.

== France ==
France has a long history of parachute candidates. Extreme examples have been candidates from mainland France who ran for election in overseas France. In 1963, Michel Debré was parachuted to the Indian Ocean island of Réunion nearly 6,000 miles away from the mainland, where he won a by-election and served as deputy for seventeen years. In the small North American territory of Saint Pierre and Miquelon, three candidates from the mainland have attempted to win its constituency seat since 2002, most recently Patricia Chagnon in 2024.

== Ireland ==
- Avril Doyle stood for Fine Gael at the 2004 European elections in the Ireland East constituency, despite being from Dublin, and was considered a parachute candidate.
- George Lee was a successful parachute candidate for Fine Gael at the 2009 Dublin South by-election.
- Lorraine Mulligan was described as a parachute candidate when she stood for Labour at the 2014 Dublin West by-election, despite living in Dublin Central.
- Catherine Noone stood for Fine Gael in Dublin West at the 2016 general election; she later attempted to be "parachuted" in Dublin South-West before standing in Dublin Bay North at the 2020 general election.
- Sheila Nunan stood for the Labour Party at the 2019 European elections in the Ireland South constituency, despite living in Dublin. Her team replied that she lived near the border with County Wicklow and her parents are from County Kerry, both counties in the South constituency. Michael McNamara claimed that "a parachute candidate could look like desperation. We [the Labour Party] need to be relevant and have relevant ideas for people in rural Ireland."
- Journalist Susan O'Keeffe was described as a parachute candidate by local candidate Veronica Cawley when she stood for Labour in Sligo–North Leitrim at the 2011 general election; O'Keeffe is a native of Dublin but lived in Sligo at the time.

== New Zealand ==
In 2017, Deborah Russell won selection for the safe Labour seat of New Lynn, in West Auckland, despite being from Whangamōmona, a small town in the Manawatū-Whanganui region. She beat out Greg Presland, a New Lynn resident for 30 years who had the backing of the local members. However, Labour's Council backed Russell because of her finance expertise and a pledge to have more women in electorates. Upon winning selection, Russell moved to the electorate. She was elected in the 2017 election and re-elected in 2020 before being defeated in the electorate in 2023.

== Taiwan ==
Han Kuo-yu was a successful parachute candidate for Mayor of Kaohsiung at 2018 Taiwanese local elections. He has served previously on the Taipei County Council and as a member of Legislative Yuan elected by Taipei County.

== United Kingdom ==
Parachute candidates are common in the Parliament of the United Kingdom. The Westminster system historically emphasizes party discipline over responsiveness to constituencies. For example, Margaret Thatcher, who was Prime Minister of the United Kingdom for over eleven years, represented Finchley during her parliamentary career despite living in Chelsea, London. As far back as the 1900s, the then-dominant Liberal Party were parachuting candidates from England into safe seats in Scotland, including Winston Churchill, elected MP for Dundee in 1908. This led to a formal protest movement, called Young Scots, arguing that objections to carpet-baggers were based on a lack of understanding of the political will of their constituents on matters like Home Rule.

A 2013 YouGov survey found that support for a hypothetical candidate rose by 12 points after voters learned that his opponent had moved to the area two years earlier and by 30 points if the opponent lived 200 km away. The percentage of local MPs rose, according to Michael Rush of the University of Exeter, from 25 % in 1979 to 45 % in 1997; Ralph Scott of Demos calculates that as of 2014 63 % are local. According to surveys, public trust in all MPs has decreased, but trust in the local MP has increased, making pre-existing connections to seats more critical. Election advertisements emphasize local connections more than they mention the candidate's party or its leader. Such a change produces MPs who are more attentive to local issues, but may be detrimental to Britain's first-past-the-post voting system designed to create broad parties that party whips stabilize.

=== Labour Party ===
- Luciana Berger was a middle-class Londoner parachuted into the north-western working-class safe Labour seat of Liverpool Wavertree. She was heavily criticised for having no connection to the Wavertree constituency or Liverpool when she first ran in 2010. When a local radio station asked her basic questions about the culture of Liverpool, she could not answer them and, during the selection process, she stayed at the house of retiring local MP Jane Kennedy rather than resettle in the area. Some figures in the media suggested that she was only selected for the seat because of her close connections to the family of former Prime Minister Tony Blair. Berger won the seat in 2010 with a slightly larger majority than Kennedy had in 2005, against the national trend, then retained it in 2015 and 2017. After joining the Liberal Democrats in 2019, she unsuccessfully contested the Greater London seat of Finchley and Golders Green at the 2019 general election. She chose to stand there because of the seat's large Jewish population and Remain vote, as well as her affinity towards living in London and choice to raise her children there rather than in Liverpool.
- Roy Jenkins was so unfamiliar with Glasgow, he later wrote, that on his arrival to campaign at the 1982 Glasgow Hillhead by-election its skyline was "as mysterious to me as the minarets of Constantinople" to Russian troops during the Russo-Turkish War. Campaigning as a Social Democrat, Jenkins won the election, taking the seat from the Scottish Conservatives.
- David and Ed Miliband were selected to fight safe Labour seats in northern England, South Shields and Doncaster North respectively, despite being Oxford graduates who were born, raised, and living in London while working as political advisers. David was elected for the first time in 2001, and Ed in 2005. Both would later serve as ministers under Tony Blair and Gordon Brown and fight against each other in the 2010 party leadership election.
- Shaun Woodward, who was first elected as a Conservative MP in 1997, defected to the Labour Party in 1999. He faced much criticism from former Conservative colleagues, particularly when he refused to resign and fight a by-election. In 2001, Woodward did not contest his safe Conservative seat of Witney in Oxfordshire, instead being selected for the similarly ultra-safe Labour seat of St Helens South in Merseyside. During the early days of the 2001 general election campaign, Labour minister Chris Mullin wrote in his diary on 11 May about "speculation about which members of the New Labour elite will be parachuted into one of the safe seats being vacated by MPs retiring at the last moment." On 14 May, Mullin described Woodward's selection at St Helens as "one of New Labour's vilest stitch-ups" and wrote that listening to him campaigning as a Labour candidate "made my flesh creep."

=== Conservative Party ===
- Prior to the 2024 general election, Richard Holden, who was serving as the Chairman of the Conservative Party, represented the marginal seat of North West Durham, which he won in the 2019 general election with a slender 2.4% majority. His seat was abolished by the 2023 Periodic Review of Westminster constituencies and he was later selected for the safe Conservative seat of Basildon and Billericay after the Conservative Party imposed him as the candidate against local opposition; Holden was the only contender allowed to stand on the shortlist. This led to accusations of carpetbagging, especially after it emerged that, in January 2024, he described himself as "bloody loyal to the north-east", and denied he would seek a safer seat. Ironically, Holden went on to win by a mere twenty votes.
- Boris Johnson's selection for the ultra-safe Conservative seat of Henley in 2001, after the party's central office parachuted him in, was described by senior local Tory Mike McInnes as "a disaster for the integrity of modern politics" and "arrogant in the extreme", Johnson having "blustered in with no knowledge about the constituency". McInnes commented that he could not see him supporting a hypothetical local old lady who was having problems with her housing benefit and asked, "Are people going to feel comfortable going to him?" Likewise, Johnson's main rival, Liberal Democrat candidate Catherine Bearder said: "In Henley, you can put a blue rosette on a donkey and it will get elected. And that's what happened in 2001... He clearly just wanted to be an MP. As soon as London came up, he was off out."

=== Minor parties ===
- Douglas Carswell defected from the Conservatives to the UK Independence Party in 2014, in turn displacing the existing UKIP candidate for the forthcoming general election in his constituency of Clacton. As Carswell was living in London then, the former UKIP candidate accused him of carpetbagging.
- George Galloway was expelled from Labour in 2003 over Iraq War-related controversies and, despite previously representing Glasgow Kelvin, stood for the Respect Party in the Greater London constituency of Bethnal Green and Bow at the 2005 general election, where he used his opposition to the war and the local Muslim population to gain the seat from Labour. Constitutional Affairs Minister David Lammy said he was a carpetbagger who had whipped up racial tensions. After standing down from Bethnal Green and Bow in 2010, he stood for Respect at a 2012 by-election in the West Yorkshire seat of Bradford West, another constituency with a high local Muslim population. Galloway made a point of not drinking alcohol and again gained the seat from Labour. He lost Bradford West in 2015 to Labour's Naz Shah. As an independent, he unsuccessfully contested Manchester Gorton in 2017 and West Bromwich East in 2019. He attempted to be selected as the Brexit Party candidate in the Cambridgeshire seat of Peterborough in a 2019 by-election but the party selected local businessman Mike Greene. Having formed the Workers Party of Britain, Galloway returned to parliament at the 2024 Rochdale by-election in which there were a variety of problems with the major-party candidates and he ran a campaign critical of Israel over its role in the Gaza war.
- In 1974, Enoch Powell left the Conservative Party and joined the Ulster Unionists, becoming the Westminster MP for South Down, despite having no Ulster connections. In 2002, when ex-Tory MP Andrew Hunter (who had family and Orange Order connections with Northern Ireland) joined the Democratic Unionist Party, the UUP accused him of being a carpet-bagger. It was pointed out the criticism was "a little hollow" considering the UUP's prior acceptance and promotion of Powell.

== United States ==
=== U.S. Senate ===
- Dan Bongino, a former New York City Police Officer and Member of the United States Secret Service was the unsuccessful Republican nominee in the 2012 United States Senate election in Maryland, and Maryland's 6th Congressional District in 2014. Bongino moved to Florida in 2015, and unsuccessfully sought the Republican Nomination for Florida's 19th Congressional District in 2016. He later served as Deputy Director of the Federal Bureau of Investigation in the Second Trump Administration.
- Scott Brown was the unsuccessful Republican nominee in the 2014 United States Senate election in New Hampshire, despite having represented Massachusetts in the Senate just two years prior. Brown's family had previously resided in New Hampshire, however, and he owned a vacation home in the state.
- Sam Brown was the unsuccessful Republican nominee in the 2022 United States Senate Election in Nevada. In 2018, Brown ran unsuccessfully for a seat in the Texas House of Representatives. He moved from Dallas, Texas, to Reno, Nevada in 2018. Brown later served as the Under Secretary of Veterans Affairs for Memorial Affairs in the Second Trump Administration.
- Hillary Clinton was elected in the 2000 United States Senate election in New York after buying a house in Chappaqua in 1999. Born in Illinois, Clinton had previously lived in Arkansas and Washington, D.C.; she served as a senator until she resigned in 2009 to become United States Secretary of State.
- Robert F. Kennedy was elected to the U.S. Senate in New York in 1964, serving from 1965 until his death on June 6, 1968. He had previously resided in his home state of Massachusetts. His opponents accused Kennedy of merely using the state as a convenient launching pad for the presidency.
- Alan Keyes, a resident of Maryland, was the unsuccessful Republican nominee in the 2004 Illinois United States Senate election. Notably, he had previously run unsuccessfully for the Senate in Maryland in 1988 and 1992.
- Mehmet Oz moved from Cliffside Park, New Jersey to Bryn Athyn, Pennsylvania, several months prior to the primary of the 2022 United States Senate election in Pennsylvania. Oz did, however, grow up in Wilmington, Delaware, within the Philadelphia metropolitan area.
- Tommy Tuberville was elected in the 2020 United States Senate Election in Alabama. Tuberville, who had served as the Head Coach of the Auburn University Tigers from 1988 to 2008, was raised in Arkansas. Though Tuberville filed taxes as an Alabama resident in 2018, he voted in the Florida election that year, and registered to vote in Alabama on March 28, 2019, a week before beginning his campaign. In 2026, during Tuberville's successful campaign for Governor of Alabama, campaign finance reports and property documents indicated that he lives in Santa Rosa Beach, Florida, not Auburn, as previously claimed.

=== U.S. House of Representatives ===
- Kat Abughazaleh, a candidate for the Democratic nomination for Congress in Illinois's 9th congressional district in the 2026 Democratic primary election. Abughazaleh moved to Chicago from Washington D.C. in July 2024 and did not vote in Illinois in the 2024 general election. At the time of her announcement, she did not live in Illinois's 9th congressional district, having only registered to vote in Illinois's 7th congressional district a month before her announcement.
- Lauren Boebert was elected in 2020 to serve as the U.S Representative for Colorado's 3rd Congressionl District. After narrowly winning re-election in 2022, she announced in December, 2023 that she would run in Colorado's 4th Congrssional District, which was considered to be a safer seat for Republican candidates. Boebert won in 2024, but was narrowly defeted in 2026 by the Democratic candidate, retired two-star United States Navy Rear Admiral Eileen Laubacher.
- Eli Crane was elected in 2022 to serve as the U.S. representative for Arizona's 2nd congressional district, while he resides in Oro Valley, which is in Arizona's 1st congressional district. The majority of Crane's district is on the northern side of Arizona, while he resides in the southern areas of the state.
- Trey Hollingsworth moved from Tennessee to Indiana in September 2015. He ran as a Republican to represent Indiana's 9th congressional district in the House of Representatives, and won the election in 2016.
- Alex Mooney, a former member of the Maryland Senate and former chairman of the Maryland Republican Party, moved to West Virginia in 2013 after previously exploring a run in Maryland's 6th congressional district. Less than two years after moving, he was elected in the 2014 general election to represent West Virginia's 2nd congressional district. Mooney unsuccessfully ran for the US Senate seat held by Senator Joe Manchin.
- Morgan Ortagus, a former State Department spokeswoman, moved from Florida to Tennessee only months before announcing her candidacy for the 2022 Republican primary in Tennessee's 5th congressional district. Ortagus was ultimately disqualified due to the Tennessee Republican Party's bylaws requiring candidates to have voted in three of the last four Tennessee Republican primaries.
- Claudia Tenney was elected in 2020 to represent New York's 22nd congressional district. Initial redistricting maps in 2022 split NY-22 between several different districts. Tenney announced that she would run in the new 23rd district, which covers the western part of the Southern Tier. Although Tenney did not live in that district, she pointed out that her family's business was based in Chenango County. However, the initial redistricting maps were challenged in court and replaced with maps drawn by a special master. Tenney announced that she would instead run in the 24th district, which runs along the Lake Ontario coast; she does not reside in that district either. She won the Republican primary with 54% of the vote, and handily won election in the strongly Republican district with 64% of the vote.

== See also ==
- List of democracy and elections-related topics
