= List of electoral divisions in New South Wales =

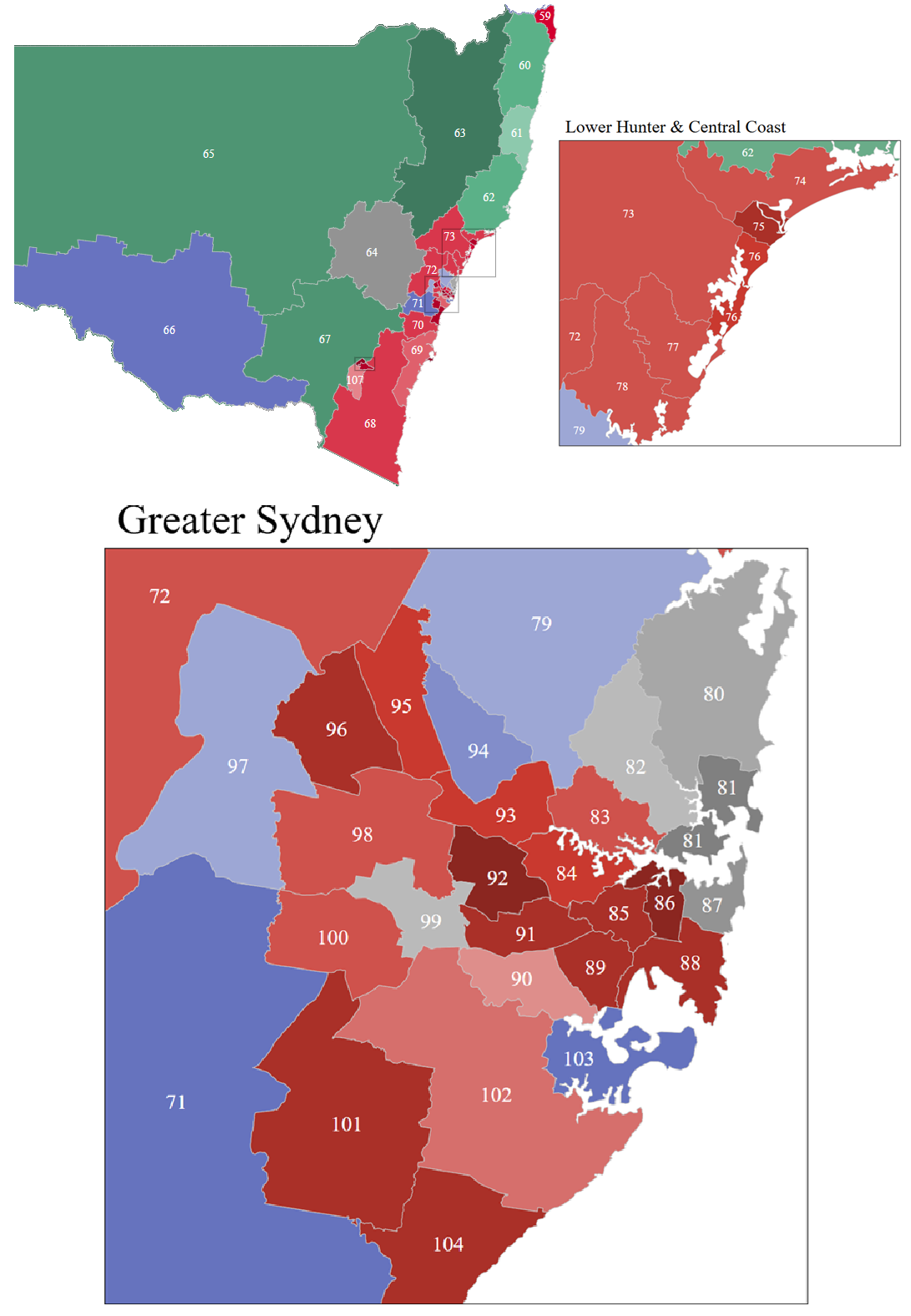
Results of the 2025 federal election

The Australian state of New South Wales is divided into 46 electoral divisions for the purposes of electing the Australian House of Representatives. At the 2025 federal election, the Australian Labor Party won 28 seats, the Liberals won 6 seats, the Nationals won 6 seats, and 6 seats were won by independents.

== Divisions ==
Name	Formed	Size (km^{2})	Classification	Current member	Political party	Reference
Banks	1949	61	Inner-metropolitan	Zhi Soon	Labor	
Barton	1922	42	Inner-metropolitan	Ash Ambihaipahar	Labor	
Bennelong	1949	60	Inner-metropolitan	Jerome Laxale	Labor	
Berowra	1969	751	Outer-metropolitan	Julian Leeser	Liberal	
Blaxland	1949	59	Inner-metropolitan	Jason Clare	Labor	
Bradfield	1949	105	Inner-metropolitan	Nicolette Boele	Independent	
Calare	1906	32,648	Rural	Andrew Gee	Independent	
Chifley	1969	113	Outer-metropolitan	Ed Husic	Labor	
Cook	1969	67	Inner-metropolitan	Simon Kennedy	Liberal	
Cowper	1901	7,271	Provincial	Pat Conaghan	Nationals	
Cunningham	1949	536	Provincial	Alison Byrnes	Labor	
Dobell	1984	675	Provincial	Emma McBride	Labor	
Eden-Monaro	1901	31,913	Rural	Kristy McBain	Labor	
Farrer	1949	126,563	Rural	Sussan Ley	Liberal	
Fowler	1984	62	Outer-metropolitan	Dai Le	Independent	
Gilmore	1984	6,322	Rural	Fiona Phillips	Labor	
Grayndler	1949	34	Inner-metropolitan	Anthony Albanese	Labor	
Greenway	1984	90	Outer-metropolitan	Michelle Rowland	Labor	
Hughes	1955	380	Outer-metropolitan	David Moncrieff	Labor	
Hume	1901	2,674	Provincial	Angus Taylor	Liberal	
Hunter	1901	7,253	Rural	Dan Repacholi	Labor	
Kingsford Smith	1949	61	Inner-metropolitan	Matt Thistlethwaite	Labor	
Lindsay	1984	325	Outer-metropolitan	Melissa McIntosh	Liberal	
Lyne	1949	16,041	Rural	Alison Penfold	National	
Macarthur	1949	307	Outer-metropolitan	Mike Freelander	Labor	
Mackellar	1949	222	Outer-metropolitan	Sophie Scamps	Independent	
Macquarie	1901	4,387	Provincial	Susan Templeman	Labor	
McMahon	2010	179	Outer-metropolitan	Chris Bowen	Labor	
Mitchell	1949	79	Outer-metropolitan	Alex Hawke	Liberal	
New England	1901	75,237	Rural	Barnaby Joyce	Nationals	
Newcastle	1901	159	Provincial	Sharon Claydon	Labor	
Page	1984	19,355	Rural	Kevin Hogan	Nationals	
Parkes	1984	406,755	Rural	Jamie Chaffey	Nationals	
Parramatta	1901	66	Inner-metropolitan	Andrew Charlton	Labor	
Paterson	1949/1993	948	Provincial	Meryl Swanson	Labor	
Reid	1922	49	Inner-metropolitan	Sally Sitou	Labor	
Richmond	1901	2,133	Rural	Justine Elliot	Labor	
Riverina	1901/1993	52,410	Rural	Michael McCormack	Nationals	
Robertson	1901	980	Provincial	Gordon Reid	Labor	
Shortland	1949	265	Provincial	Pat Conroy	Labor	
Sydney	1968	45	Inner-metropolitan	Tanya Plibersek	Labor	
Warringah	1922	51	Inner-metropolitan	Zali Steggall	Independent	
Watson	1992	51	Inner-metropolitan	Tony Burke	Labor	
Wentworth	1901	31	Inner-metropolitan	Allegra Spender	Independent	
Werriwa	1901	111	Outer-metropolitan	Anne Stanley	Labor	
Whitlam	2016	2,966	Provincial	Carol Berry	Labor	

== See also ==
- Parliament of New South Wales
