= Results of the 2025 Australian federal election in New South Wales =

Federal election results in New South Wales, Australia

2025 Australian federal election (New South Wales)
- 3 May 2025

All 46 New South Wales seats in the House of Representatives and 6 of the 12 seats in the Senate
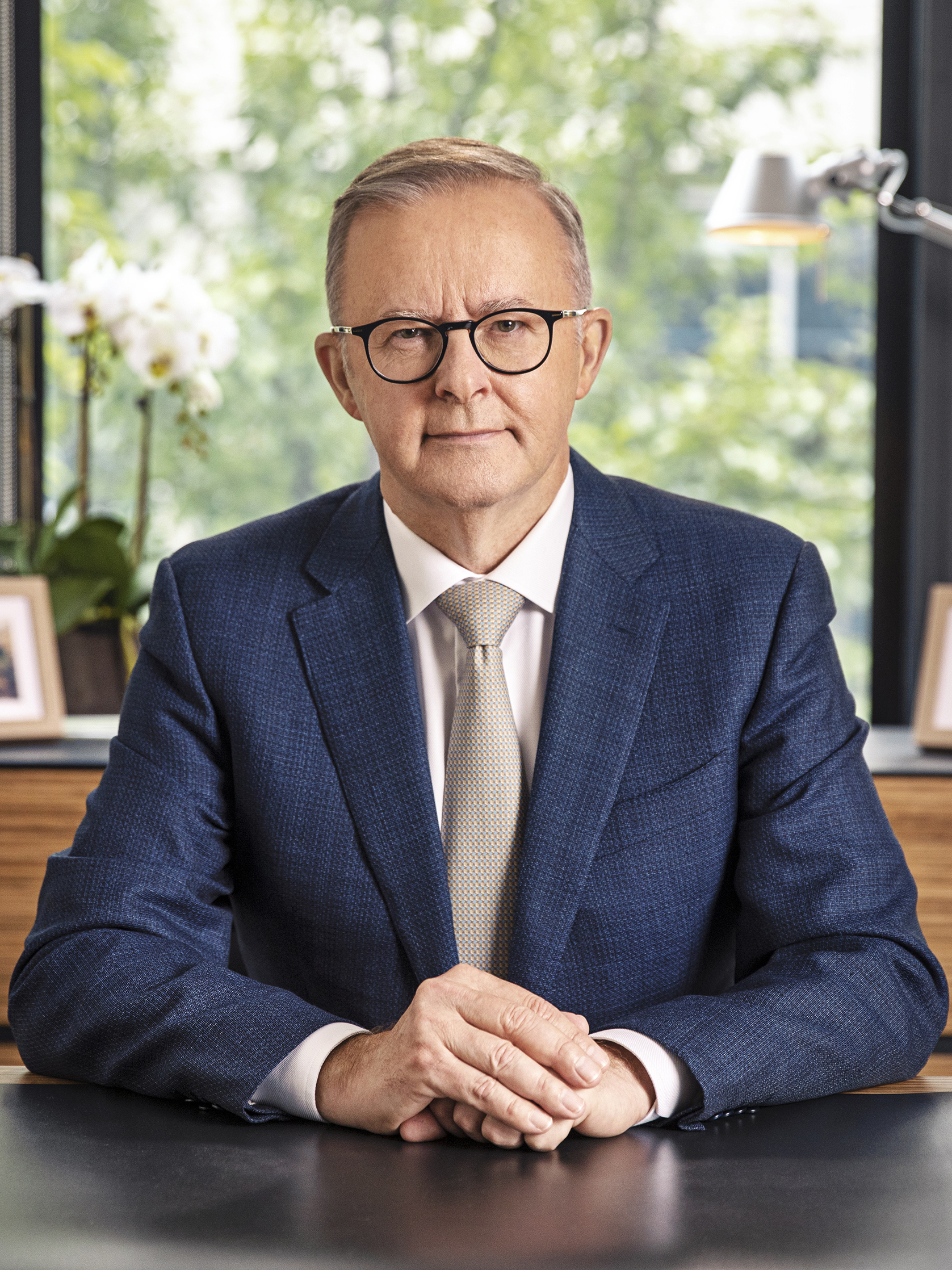

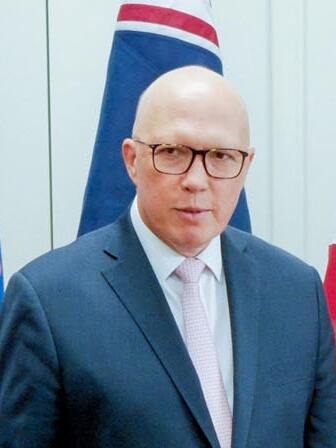
	First party	Second party	Third party
			IND
Leader	Anthony Albanese	Peter Dutton	N/A
Party	Labor	Coalition	Independents
Last election	26 seats	16 seats	5 seats
Seats won	28	12	6
Seat change	▲2	▼4	▲1
Primary vote	1,686,994	1,511,236	465,188
Percentage	35.20%	31.53%	9.71%
Swing	▲1.82	▼5.01	▲2.15
TPP	55.27%	44.73%
TPP swing	▲3.85	▼3.85
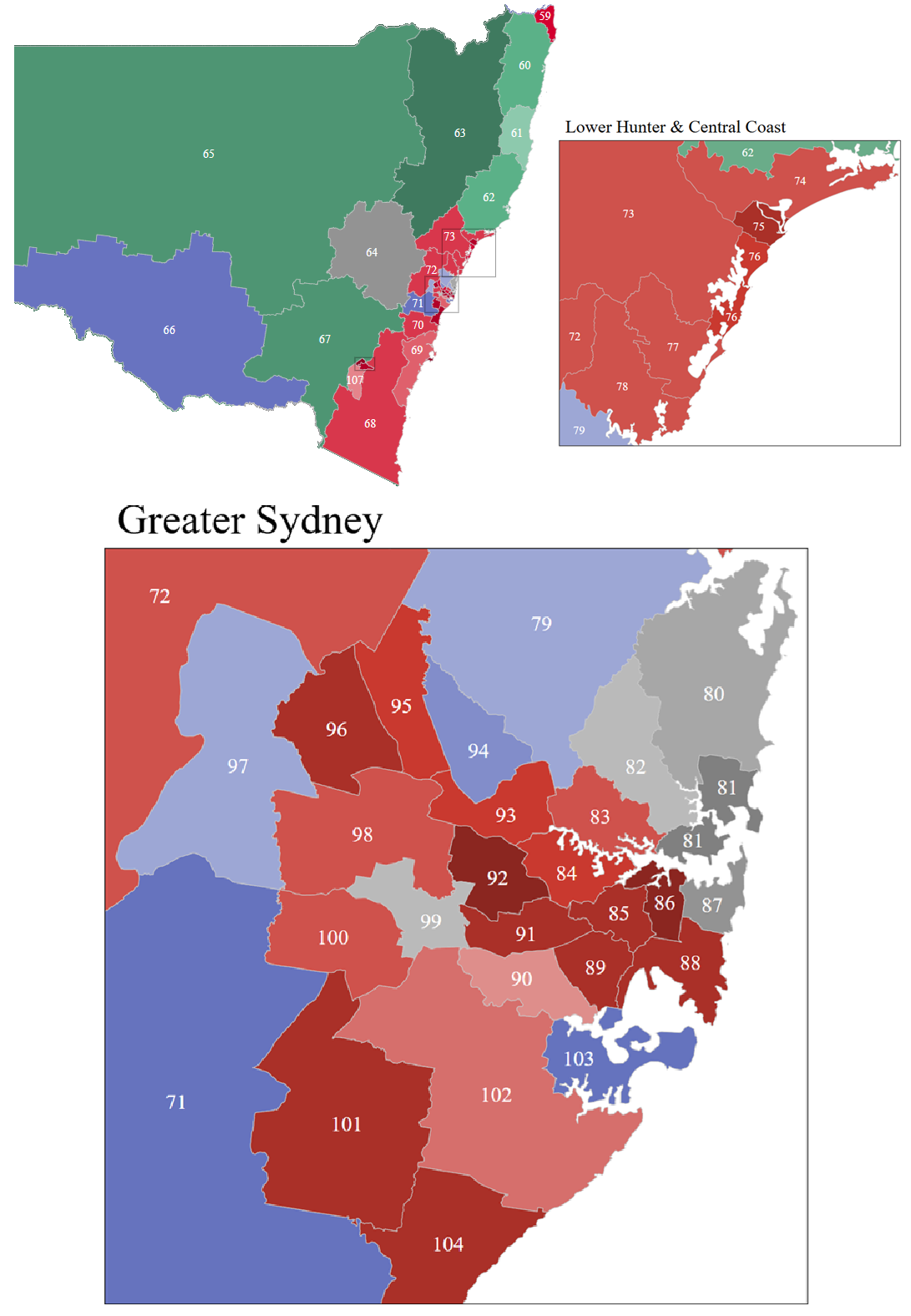

This is a list of electoral division results for the 2025 Australian federal election in the state of New South Wales.

== Overall results ==
House of Representatives (IRV) – Turnout 91.58% (CV)
Party	Primary Vote			Seats	
Party	No.	%	Swing (pp)	No.	Change
Labor	1,686,994	35.20	+1.82	28	▲2
Liberal–National Coalition	1,511,236	31.53	−5.01	12	▼4
Liberal	1,160,759	24.22	−4.08	6	▼3
Nationals	350,477	7.31	−0.93	6	▼1
Greens	530,302	11.06	+1.04	0	Steady
One Nation	288,676	6.02	+1.18	0	Steady
Trumpet of Patriots	87,846	1.83	+1.77	0	Steady
Family First	63,818	1.33	+1.33	0	Steady
Libertarian	52,124	1.09	−1.00	0	Steady
Legalise Cannabis	44,764	0.93	+0.93	0	Steady
Shooters, Fishers, Farmers	23,511	0.49	+0.17	0	Steady
Animal Justice	10,062	0.21	−0.16	0	Steady
Citizens	6,253	0.13	+0.08	0	Steady
People First	5,442	0.11	+0.11	0	Steady
Fusion	4,394	0.09	−0.09	0	Steady
Socialist Alliance	4,032	0.08	+0.05	0	Steady
HEART	3,916	0.08	−0.22	0	Steady
Indigenous-Aboriginal	3,117	0.07	−0.09	0	Steady
Democrats	688	0.01	+0.00	0	Steady
Independent	465,188	9.71	+2.15	6	▲1
Not affiliated	888	0.02	−0.00	0	Steady
Total	4,793,251	100.00	–	46	▼1
Informal	420,008	8.06	+1.84	–	–
Turnout	5,213,259	91.58	+0.88	–	–
Registered voters	5,692,270	–	–	–	–
Two-party-preferred vote
Labor	2,649,390	55.27	+3.85		
Liberal–National Coalition	2,143,861	44.73	−3.85		
Source: AEC

== Results by division ==
=== Banks ===
2025 Australian federal election: Banks
Party	Candidate	Votes	%	±%
Liberal	David Coleman	38,683	39.10	−5.50
Labor	Zhi Soon	36,039	36.43	+0.59
Greens	Natalie Hanna	11,756	11.88	+3.27
One Nation	Todd Nicol	3,666	3.71	+0.44
Trumpet of Patriots	Allan Taruste	3,430	3.47	+3.47
Libertarian	Marika Momircevski	2,678	2.71	+1.54
Independent	John Coyne	1,995	2.02	+2.02
Democrats	Phillip Pearce	688	0.70	+0.70
Total formal votes		98,935	90.00	−3.16
Informal votes		10,998	10.00	+3.16
Turnout		109,933	92.13	+1.61
Two-party-preferred result
Labor	Zhi Soon	51,830	52.39	+5.03
Liberal	David Coleman	47,105	47.61	−5.03
Labor gain from Liberal		Swing	+5.03	

Alluvial diagram illustrating the full distribution of preferences in the seat of Banks for the 2025 Federal Election

=== Barton ===
2025 Australian federal election: Barton
Party	Candidate	Votes	%	±%
Labor	Ash Ambihaipahar	47,098	47.12	−0.87
Liberal	Fiona Douskou	24,162	24.17	−5.23
Greens	Manal Bahsa	15,885	15.89	+4.88
One Nation	Christos Nicolis	5,573	5.58	+0.72
Trumpet of Patriots	Thomas Pambris	3,814	3.82	+3.82
Libertarian	Vinay Kolhatkar	3,419	3.42	+3.31
Total formal votes		99,951	90.69	−1.35
Informal votes		10,256	9.31	+1.35
Turnout		110,207	91.26	+1.94
Two-party-preferred result
Labor	Ash Ambihaipahar	65,971	66.00	+4.01
Liberal	Fiona Douskou	33,980	34.00	−4.01
Labor hold		Swing	+4.01	

Alluvial diagram illustrating the full distribution of preferences in the seat of Barton for the 2025 Federal Election

=== Bennelong ===
2025 Australian federal election: Bennelong
Party	Candidate	Votes	%	±%
Labor	Jerome Laxale	49,801	45.35	+13.26
Liberal	Scott Yung	38,510	35.07	−5.61
Greens	Adam Hart	12,931	11.78	+1.44
One Nation	Craig Bennett	2,534	2.31	+0.77
Family First	Eric Chan	1,934	1.76	+1.76
Fusion	John August	1,675	1.53	+0.12
Trumpet of Patriots	Robert Nalbandian	1,621	1.48	+1.48
HEART	Barry Devine	806	0.73	+0.56
Total formal votes		109,812	93.85	−0.51
Informal votes		7,196	6.15	+0.51
Turnout		117,008	92.90	+2.25
Two-party-preferred result
Labor	Jerome Laxale	65,076	59.26	+9.30
Liberal	Scott Yung	44,736	40.74	−9.30
Labor notional gain from Liberal		Swing	+9.30	

=== Berowra ===
2025 Australian federal election: Berowra
Party	Candidate	Votes	%	±%
Liberal	Julian Leeser	48,210	41.72	−5.47
Labor	Benson Koschinski	31,220	27.01	+3.19
Greens	Martin Cousins	13,781	11.92	−2.97
Independent	Tina Brown	13,135	11.37	+11.37
One Nation	Gerald Mattinson	4,705	4.07	+1.20
Trumpet of Patriots	Stephen Bastian	2,199	1.90	+1.48
Independent	Roger Woodward	1,236	1.07	+0.34
Fusion	Brendan Clarke	1,082	0.94	−0.45
Total formal votes		115,568	93.61	−0.65
Informal votes		7,892	6.39	+0.65
Turnout		123,460	94.34	+2.03
Two-party-preferred result
Liberal	Julian Leeser	59,673	51.63	−5.93
Labor	Benson Koschinski	55,895	48.37	+5.93
Liberal hold		Swing	−5.93	

=== Blaxland ===
2025 Australian federal election: Blaxland
Party	Candidate	Votes	%	±%
Labor	Jason Clare	40,001	46.04	−5.52
Liberal	Courtney Nguyen	17,023	19.59	−7.58
Independent	Ahmed Ouf	16,302	18.76	+18.76
Greens	Omar Sakr	6,854	7.89	+1.07
One Nation	Mitchell Klievens	3,086	3.55	−0.90
Libertarian	Mike Luo	1,894	2.18	+1.08
Family First	Jennifer Di Girolamo	1,726	1.99	+1.99
Total formal votes		86,886	87.14	−1.32
Informal votes		12,822	12.86	+1.32
Turnout		99,708	85.43	+3.41
Two-party-preferred result
Labor	Jason Clare	62,474	71.90	+8.86
Liberal	Courtney Nguyen	24,412	28.10	−8.86
Labor hold		Swing	+8.86	

=== Bradfield ===
2025 Australian federal election: Bradfield
Party	Candidate	Votes	%	±%
Liberal	Gisele Kapterian	42,676	38.03	−5.63
Independent	Nicolette Boele	30,309	27.01	+10.95
Labor	Louise McCallum	22,768	20.29	+2.56
Greens	Harjit Singh	7,551	6.73	−1.89
Independent	Andy Yin	4,635	4.13	+4.13
One Nation	John Manton	1,725	1.54	+0.07
Libertarian	Samuel Gunning	1,376	1.23	+0.94
Trumpet of Patriots	Rosemary Mulligan	1,162	1.04	+1.04
Total formal votes		112,202	94.40	−1.69
Informal votes		6,656	5.60	+1.69
Turnout		118,858	93.69	+1.11
Notional two-party-preferred count
Liberal	Gisele Kapterian	61,658	54.95	−1.18
Labor	Louise McCallum	50,544	45.05	+1.18
Two-candidate-preferred result
Independent	Nicolette Boele	56,114	50.01	+3.41
Liberal	Gisele Kapterian	56,088	49.99	−3.41
Independent gain from Liberal		Swing	+3.41	

The AEC applied a mathematical equation to approximate the Two-Party Preferred (TPP) figure for Bradfield, as they were unable to conduct a 'scrutiny-for-information' count to get the TPP figure due to the potential for a petition to the Court of Disputed Returns regarding the Bradfield result. The Liberals launched then withdrew a court challenge to the result. Analysis by independent psephologists suggests that the actual TPP figure may favour Labor over the Liberals.

=== Calare ===
2025 Australian federal election: Calare
Party	Candidate	Votes	%	±%
National	Sam Farraway	31,577	29.71	−17.96
Independent	Andrew Gee	25,172	23.69	+23.69
Independent	Kate Hook	16,756	15.77	−4.63
Labor	Julie Cunningham	11,086	10.43	−4.71
One Nation	Jennifer Hughes	8,200	7.72	−0.72
Legalise Cannabis	Sue Raye	4,162	3.92	+3.92
Greens	Ben Parker	3,753	3.53	−1.03
Shooters, Fishers, Farmers	Jase Lesage	2,245	2.11	+2.11
Family First	Ross Hazelton	1,733	1.63	+1.63
Trumpet of Patriots	Vicki O'Leary	1,583	1.49	+1.49
Total formal votes		106,267	91.98	−4.03
Informal votes		9,271	8.02	+4.03
Turnout		115,538	92.68	+2.65
Notional two-party-preferred count
National	Sam Farraway	66,158	62.26	−3.19
Labor	Julie Cunningham	40,109	37.74	+3.19
Two-candidate-preferred result
Independent	Andrew Gee	60,338	56.78	+56.78
National	Sam Farraway	45,929	43.22	−16.46
Member changed to Independent from National				

=== Chifley ===
2025 Australian federal election: Chifley
Party	Candidate	Votes	%	±%
Labor	Ed Husic	47,078	52.65	−0.35
Liberal	Allan Green	17,613	19.70	−4.92
Greens	Sukhjinder Singh	8,724	9.76	+4.08
One Nation	Tony Nikolic	5,338	5.97	−0.24
Family First	Jamie Green	5,336	5.97	+5.97
Trumpet of Patriots	Ryan Archer	2,237	2.50	+2.50
Animal Justice	Rohan Laxmanalal	1,569	1.75	+1.75
Independent	Leigh Burns	1,519	1.70	+1.70
Total formal votes		89,414	86.45	−4.66
Informal votes		14,013	13.55	+4.66
Turnout		103,427	88.67	+3.93
Two-party-preferred result
Labor	Ed Husic	62,440	69.83	+6.18
Liberal	Allan Green	26,974	30.17	−6.18
Labor hold		Swing	+6.18	

=== Cook ===
2025 Australian federal election: Cook
Party	Candidate	Votes	%	±%
Liberal	Simon Kennedy	51,121	48.06	−5.66
Labor	Simon Earle	33,474	31.47	+7.46
Greens	Martin Moore	10,575	9.94	+0.50
One Nation	Mark Preston	4,638	4.36	−0.06
Family First	Natalie Fuller	3,310	3.11	+3.11
Trumpet of Patriots	Sharon Hammond	3,246	3.05	+3.05
Total formal votes		106,364	95.47	−0.45
Informal votes		5,044	4.53	+0.45
Turnout		111,408	93.73	+1.84
Two-party-preferred result
Liberal	Simon Kennedy	60,834	57.19	−4.43
Labor	Simon Earle	45,530	42.81	+4.43
Liberal hold		Swing	−4.43	

=== Cowper ===
2025 Australian federal election: Cowper
Party	Candidate	Votes	%	±%
National	Pat Conaghan	40,836	37.90	−1.62
Independent	Caz Heise	31,616	29.35	+3.18
Labor	Greg Vigors	12,713	11.80	−2.20
One Nation	Chris Walsh	6,856	6.36	−1.81
Legalise Cannabis	Megan Mathew	5,210	4.84	+4.84
Greens	Wendy Firefly	4,552	4.23	−1.62
Family First	Peter Jackel	1,851	1.72	+1.72
Trumpet of Patriots	Geoffrey Shannon	1,551	1.44	+1.44
Libertarian	Paul Templeton	1,403	1.30	−2.58
Independent	Zeke Daley	892	0.83	+0.83
Fusion	Geoffrey Marlow	255	0.24	+0.24
Total formal votes		107,735	90.08	−4.99
Informal votes		11,864	9.92	+4.99
Turnout		119,599	90.85	+2.18
Notional two-party-preferred count
National	Pat Conaghan	63,646	59.08	−0.45
Labor	Greg Vigors	44,089	40.92	+0.45
Two-candidate-preferred result
National	Pat Conaghan	56,609	52.54	+0.14
Independent	Caz Heise	51,126	47.46	−0.14
National hold		Swing	+0.14	

=== Cunningham ===
2025 Australian federal election: Cunningham
Party	Candidate	Votes	%	±%
Labor	Alison Byrnes	51,607	44.69	+3.49
Liberal	Amanda Ivaneza	26,813	23.22	−1.25
Greens	Jess Whittaker	23,584	20.42	−0.24
One Nation	John Fuller	8,765	7.59	+2.23
Animal Justice	Tim Lavers	3,048	2.64	+2.64
Citizens	Alexis Garnaut-Miller	1,657	1.43	+0.45
Total formal votes		115,474	94.60	−0.06
Informal votes		6,586	5.40	+0.06
Turnout		122,060	92.37	+1.57
Two-party-preferred result
Labor	Alison Byrnes	77,970	67.52	+2.45
Liberal	Amanda Ivaneza	37,504	32.48	−2.45
Labor hold		Swing	+2.45	

=== Dobell ===
2025 Australian federal election: Dobell
Party	Candidate	Votes	%	±%
Labor	Emma McBride	44,268	42.80	−0.09
Liberal	Brendan Small	28,757	27.80	−5.88
Greens	Simon Cooper	10,647	10.29	+1.73
One Nation	Martin Stevenson	9,040	8.74	+1.29
Legalise Cannabis	Tim Claydon	4,895	4.73	+4.73
Trumpet of Patriots	Anthony Tawaf	2,855	2.76	+2.76
Animal Justice	Patrick Murphy	1,906	1.84	+1.84
Libertarian	Isaac Chalik	1,059	1.02	−0.49
Total formal votes		103,427	92.26	−3.12
Informal votes		8,680	7.74	+3.12
Turnout		112,107	91.49	+3.12
Two-party-preferred result
Labor	Emma McBride	61,465	59.43	+2.87
Liberal	Brendan Small	41,962	40.57	−2.87
Labor hold		Swing	+2.87	

=== Eden-Monaro ===
2025 Australian federal election: Eden-Monaro
Party	Candidate	Votes	%	±%
Labor	Kristy McBain	46,088	43.04	+4.54
Liberal	Jo van der Plaat	34,142	31.88	−2.49
Greens	Emma Goward	10,739	10.03	+1.45
One Nation	Richard Graham	7,451	6.96	+2.59
Trumpet of Patriots	Wade Cox	2,587	2.42	+2.42
Independent	Andrew Thaler	2,499	2.33	+0.69
HEART	Fraser Buchanan	1,881	1.76	+1.05
Independent	Brian Fisher	1,701	1.59	+1.59
Total formal votes		107,088	94.02	+0.48
Informal votes		6,808	5.98	−0.48
Turnout		113,896	93.84	+0.95
Two-party-preferred result
Labor	Kristy McBain	61,270	57.21	+1.13
Liberal	Jo van der Plaat	45,818	42.79	−1.13
Labor hold		Swing	+1.13	

=== Farrer ===
2025 Australian federal election: Farrer
Party	Candidate	Votes	%	±%
Liberal	Sussan Ley	44,743	43.41	−8.85
Independent	Michelle Milthorpe	20,567	19.96	+19.96
Labor	Glen Hyde	15,551	15.09	−3.90
One Nation	Emma Hicks	6,803	6.60	+0.27
Greens	Richard Hendrie	5,085	4.93	−4.18
Shooters, Fishers, Farmers	Peter Sinclair	3,577	3.47	−1.84
Trumpet of Patriots	Tanya Hargraves	2,441	2.37	+2.37
Family First	Rebecca Scriven	2,218	2.15	+2.15
People First	David O'Reilly	2,078	2.02	+2.02
Total formal votes		103,063	90.97	−1.44
Informal votes		10,234	9.03	+1.44
Turnout		113,297	91.55	+2.11
Notional two-party-preferred count
Liberal	Sussan Ley	64,812	62.89	−3.46
Labor	Glen Hyde	38,251	37.11	+3.46
Two-candidate-preferred result
Liberal	Sussan Ley	57,916	56.19	−10.16
Independent	Michelle Milthorpe	45,147	43.81	+43.81
Liberal hold				

=== Fowler ===
2025 Australian federal election: Fowler
Party	Candidate	Votes	%	±%
Labor	Tu Le	34,909	37.56	+0.96
Independent	Dai Le	31,108	33.47	+5.18
Liberal	Vivek Singha	11,404	12.27	−5.32
Greens	Avery Howard	6,288	6.77	+1.89
One Nation	Tony Margos	3,835	4.13	+0.51
Family First	Jared Athavle	3,598	3.87	+3.87
Libertarian	Victor Tey	1,796	1.93	−0.58
Total formal votes		92,938	86.04	−3.43
Informal votes		15,079	13.96	+3.43
Turnout		108,017	90.05	+5.04
Notional two-party-preferred count
Labor	Tu Le	63,371	68.19	+12.29
Liberal	Vivek Singha	29,567	31.81	−12.29
Two-candidate-preferred result
Independent	Dai Le	48,956	52.68	+0.88
Labor	Tu Le	43,982	47.32	−0.88
Independent hold		Swing	+0.88	

=== Gilmore ===
2025 Australian federal election: Gilmore
Party	Candidate	Votes	%	±%
Labor	Fiona Phillips	42,342	38.13	+2.19
Liberal	Andrew Constance	38,247	34.44	−7.56
Independent	Kate Dezarnaulds	8,371	7.54	+7.54
Greens	Debbie Killian	7,932	7.14	−3.09
One Nation	John Hawke	5,557	5.00	+1.00
Legalise Cannabis	Adrian Carle	4,124	3.71	+3.71
Trumpet of Patriots	Melissa Wise	2,476	2.23	+2.23
Family First	Graham Brown	2,004	1.80	+1.80
Total formal votes		111,053	93.10	−2.47
Informal votes		8,225	6.90	+2.47
Turnout		119,278	92.47	+1.81
Two-party-preferred result
Labor	Fiona Phillips	61,223	55.13	+4.96
Liberal	Andrew Constance	49,830	44.87	−4.96
Labor hold		Swing	+4.96	

=== Grayndler ===
2025 Australian federal election: Grayndler
Party	Candidate	Votes	%	±%
Labor	Anthony Albanese	59,364	53.54	+0.84
Greens	Hannah Thomas	27,847	25.11	+4.18
Liberal	David Smallbone	15,867	14.31	−3.54
One Nation	Rodney Smith	3,505	3.16	+0.87
Independent	David Bradbury	2,566	2.31	+2.31
Trumpet of Patriots	Cheri Burrell	1,729	1.56	+1.56
Total formal votes		110,878	95.88	+0.90
Informal votes		4,763	4.12	−0.90
Turnout		115,641	92.11	+2.59
Notional two-party-preferred count
Labor	Anthony Albanese	88,897	80.18	+3.55
Liberal	David Smallbone	21,981	19.82	−3.55
Two-candidate-preferred result
Labor	Anthony Albanese	74,138	66.86	+2.89
Greens	Hannah Thomas	36,740	33.14	−2.89
Labor hold		Swing	+2.89	

=== Greenway ===
2025 Australian federal election: Greenway
Party	Candidate	Votes	%	±%
Labor	Michelle Rowland	51,802	50.41	+5.63
Liberal	Rattan Virk	28,230	27.47	−6.01
Greens	Palaniappan Subramanian	11,018	10.72	+3.08
One Nation	Edwin Swann	4,700	4.57	+1.86
Independent	Robert Stuckey	2,711	2.64	+2.64
Trumpet of Patriots	Justin Mulligan	2,663	2.59	+2.59
Libertarian	Mark Rex	1,631	1.59	−1.40
Total formal votes		102,755	93.03	+0.42
Informal votes		7,700	6.97	−0.42
Turnout		110,455	92.89	+12.78
Two-party-preferred result
Labor	Michelle Rowland	65,518	63.76	+5.82
Liberal	Rattan Virk	37,237	36.24	−5.82
Labor hold		Swing	+5.82	

=== Hughes ===
2025 Australian federal election: Hughes
Party	Candidate	Votes	%	±%
Labor	David Moncrieff	38,331	39.00	+11.08
Liberal	Jenny Ware	35,831	36.45	−3.95
Greens	Catherine Dyson	11,221	11.42	+4.99
One Nation	Deborah Swinbourn	5,253	5.34	+1.89
Trumpet of Patriots	Alex Scarfone	2,777	2.83	+2.83
Family First	Nathaniel Marsh	2,379	2.42	+2.42
Libertarian	Elvis Sinosic	1,917	1.95	+0.78
Citizens	David A. W. Miller	586	0.60	+0.60
Total formal votes		98,295	91.44	−3.39
Informal votes		9,205	8.56	+3.39
Turnout		107,500	93.57	+1.48
Two-party-preferred result
Labor	David Moncrieff	52,152	53.06	+6.52
Liberal	Jenny Ware	46,143	46.94	−6.52
Labor gain from Liberal		Swing	+6.52	

=== Hume ===
2025 Australian federal election: Hume
Party	Candidate	Votes	%	±%
Liberal	Angus Taylor	43,615	43.85	+1.32
Labor	Thomas Huang	27,073	27.22	+3.07
Greens	Steve Bruce	8,455	8.50	+2.85
One Nation	Helen Ducker	7,967	8.01	+0.07
Independent	Peter McLean	4,435	4.46	+4.46
Trumpet of Patriots	Troy Wozniak	3,472	3.49	+3.49
Family First	Bryan Seidel	2,721	2.74	+2.74
Libertarian	Adrian Rees	1,729	1.74	+0.62
Total formal votes		99,467	91.09	−1.63
Informal votes		9,729	8.91	+1.63
Turnout		109,196	92.97	+7.86
Two-party-preferred result
Liberal	Angus Taylor	57,747	58.06	+1.19
Labor	Thomas Huang	41,720	41.94	−1.19
Liberal hold		Swing	+1.19	

=== Hunter ===
2025 Australian federal election: Hunter
Party	Candidate	Votes	%	±%
Labor	Dan Repacholi	48,582	43.50	+4.07
National	Sue Gilroy	20,290	18.17	−6.51
One Nation	Stuart Bonds	18,011	16.13	+6.04
Greens	Louise Stokes	8,286	7.42	−1.40
Legalise Cannabis	Andrew Fenwick	5,655	5.06	+5.06
Trumpet of Patriots	Suellen Wrightson	4,068	3.64	+3.64
Family First	Paul Farrelly	2,644	2.37	+2.37
Shooters, Fishers, Farmers	Kyle Boddan	2,507	2.24	+2.24
Animal Justice	Victoria Davies	1,629	1.46	−0.61
Total formal votes		111,672	91.95	−0.68
Informal votes		9,782	8.05	+0.68
Turnout		121,454	91.88	+4.29
Notional two-party-preferred count
Labor	Dan Repacholi	66,424	59.48	+4.70
National	Sue Gilroy	45,248	40.52	−4.70
Two-candidate-preferred result
Labor	Dan Repacholi	65,926	59.04	+4.26
One Nation	Stuart Bonds	45,746	40.96	+40.96
Labor hold				

=== Kingsford Smith ===
2025 Australian federal election: Kingsford Smith
Party	Candidate	Votes	%	±%
Labor	Matt Thistlethwaite	50,346	50.79	+3.45
Liberal	Brad Cole	25,924	26.15	−3.46
Greens	Keiron Brown	13,440	13.56	−2.20
One Nation	Mark Jelic	5,865	5.92	+2.44
Independent	Elsa Parker	3,557	3.59	+3.59
Total formal votes		99,132	94.18	−1.05
Informal votes		6,126	5.82	+1.05
Turnout		105,258	89.66	+0.22
Two-party-preferred result
Labor	Matt Thistlethwaite	66,604	67.19	+3.88
Liberal	Brad Cole	32,528	32.81	−3.88
Labor hold		Swing	+3.88	

=== Lindsay ===
2025 Australian federal election: Lindsay
Party	Candidate	Votes	%	±%
Liberal	Melissa McIntosh	39,003	39.74	−6.68
Labor	Hollie McLean	31,502	32.10	+0.19
Greens	Aaron McAllister	9,416	9.59	+1.63
One Nation	Christopher Buckley	6,736	6.86	+0.86
Trumpet of Patriots	Joseph O'Connor	2,994	3.05	+3.05
Family First	Antony Emmanuel	2,413	2.46	+2.46
Animal Justice	Vanessa Blazi	1,910	1.95	+1.95
Shooters, Fishers, Farmers	Carl Halley	1,844	1.88	+1.88
HEART	Michelle Palmer	1,229	1.25	−0.71
Independent	Jim Saleam	1,099	1.12	+1.12
Total formal votes		98,146	89.09	−3.82
Informal votes		12,020	10.91	+3.82
Turnout		110,166	90.82	+4.26
Two-party-preferred result
Liberal	Melissa McIntosh	51,804	52.78	−3.33
Labor	Hollie McLean	46,342	47.22	+3.33
Liberal hold		Swing	−3.33	

=== Lyne ===
2025 Australian federal election: Lyne
Party	Candidate	Votes	%	±%
National	Alison Penfold	39,629	36.24	−7.27
Labor	Digby Wilson	21,667	19.81	−1.66
Independent	Jeremy Miller	16,943	15.49	+15.49
One Nation	Colin Hughes	9,174	8.39	+0.46
Greens	Tom Ferrier	6,977	6.38	−1.47
Legalise Cannabis	Keys Manley	5,995	5.48	+5.48
Libertarian	Mark Hornshaw	4,165	3.81	−2.55
Trumpet of Patriots	Cathy Charsley	2,690	2.46	+2.46
Family First	David Masters	1,662	1.52	+1.52
Citizens	Stephen Burke	448	0.41	+0.41
Total formal votes		109,350	90.88	−2.53
Informal votes		10,979	9.12	+2.53
Turnout		120,329	92.86	+2.30
Two-party-preferred result
National	Alison Penfold	65,369	59.78	−4.02
Labor	Digby Wilson	43,981	40.22	+4.02
National hold		Swing	−4.02	

=== Macarthur ===
2025 Australian federal election: Macarthur
Party	Candidate	Votes	%	±%
Labor	Mike Freelander	45,080	48.20	+1.33
Liberal	Binod Paudel	21,593	23.09	−6.22
Greens	Frankie Scott	12,012	12.84	+5.01
One Nation	Gregory Grogan	7,336	7.84	−0.14
Family First	Graham Charlesworth	3,690	3.95	+3.95
Libertarian	Connie Harvey	2,443	2.61	+0.47
Fusion	Edward Palmer	1,382	1.48	+1.48
Total formal votes		93,536	90.18	−2.44
Informal votes		10,188	9.82	+2.44
Turnout		103,724	90.19	+7.03
Two-party-preferred result
Labor	Mike Freelander	61,365	65.61	+5.85
Liberal	Binod Paudel	32,171	34.39	−5.85
Labor hold		Swing	+5.85	

=== Mackellar ===
2025 Australian federal election: Mackellar
Party	Candidate	Votes	%	±%
Independent	Sophie Scamps	42,482	37.98	+4.26
Liberal	James Brown	39,647	35.45	−5.06
Labor	Jeffrey Quinn	13,499	12.07	+3.70
Greens	Ethan Hrnjak	6,858	6.13	−0.21
One Nation	Brad Hayman	2,825	2.53	−0.13
Independent	Lisa Cotton	2,297	2.05	+2.05
Libertarian	Justin Addison	1,949	1.74	+1.74
Trumpet of Patriots	Amber Robertson	1,588	1.42	+1.42
Independent	Mandeep Singh	702	0.63	+0.63
Total formal votes		111,847	92.63	−3.61
Informal votes		8,894	7.37	+3.61
Turnout		120,741	93.35	+1.66
Notional two-party-preferred count
Liberal	James Brown	60,014	53.66	−4.21
Labor	Jeffrey Quinn	51,833	46.34	+4.21
Two-candidate-preferred result
Independent	Sophie Scamps	62,255	55.66	+3.89
Liberal	James Brown	49,592	44.34	−3.89
Independent hold		Swing	+3.89	

=== Macquarie ===
2025 Australian federal election: Macquarie
Party	Candidate	Votes	%	±%
Labor	Susan Templeman	46,773	42.64	+0.83
Liberal	Mike Creed	34,643	31.58	−4.31
Greens	Terry Morgan	13,666	12.46	+2.99
One Nation	Matthew Jacobson	9,587	8.74	+3.56
Family First	Roger Bowen	3,226	2.94	+2.94
Libertarian	Joaquim De Lima	1,810	1.65	+0.30
Total formal votes		109,705	95.84	+0.88
Informal votes		4,758	4.16	−0.88
Turnout		114,463	93.87	+1.78
Two-party-preferred result
Labor	Susan Templeman	63,306	57.71	+1.38
Liberal	Mike Creed	46,399	42.29	−1.38
Labor hold		Swing	+1.38	

=== McMahon ===
2025 Australian federal election: McMahon
Party	Candidate	Votes	%	±%
Labor	Chris Bowen	44,537	45.52	−2.99
Liberal	Carmen Lazar	26,218	26.80	−1.31
Independent	Matthew Camenzuli	9,613	9.83	+9.83
Greens	Ben Hammond	8,923	9.12	+3.02
One Nation	Melissa Janicska	8,544	8.73	+3.69
Total formal votes		97,835	89.42	−0.81
Informal votes		11,581	10.58	+0.81
Turnout		109,416	90.77	+6.13
Two-party-preferred result
Labor	Chris Bowen	57,742	59.02	−1.46
Liberal	Carmen Lazar	40,093	40.98	+1.46
Labor hold		Swing	−1.46	

=== Mitchell ===
2025 Australian federal election: Mitchell
Party	Candidate	Votes	%	±%
Liberal	Alex Hawke	50,758	46.33	−6.07
Labor	Dilvan Bircan	36,396	33.22	+7.62
Greens	Ben Speechly	15,044	13.73	+1.75
One Nation	Brendan McCreanor	4,680	4.27	+1.32
Trumpet of Patriots	Mark Crocker	2,675	2.44	+2.42
Total formal votes		109,553	94.68	−0.99
Informal votes		6,156	5.32	+0.99
Turnout		115,709	94.07	+3.98
Two-party-preferred result
Liberal	Alex Hawke	58,949	53.81	−6.68
Labor	Dilvan Bircan	50,604	46.19	+6.68
Liberal hold		Swing	−6.68	

=== New England ===
2025 Australian federal election: New England
Party	Candidate	Votes	%	±%
National	Barnaby Joyce	59,711	52.22	+1.44
Labor	Laura Hughes	23,233	20.32	+0.37
One Nation	Brent Larkham	11,387	9.96	+4.70
Greens	Wendy Wales	9,023	7.89	+0.38
Independent	Natasha Ledger	4,240	3.71	+1.21
Family First	Holly Masters	3,646	3.19	+3.19
Trumpet of Patriots	Todd Juchau	3,106	2.72	+2.72
Total formal votes		114,346	95.16	+1.64
Informal votes		5,816	4.84	−1.64
Turnout		120,162	91.56	+1.85
Two-party-preferred result
National	Barnaby Joyce	76,680	67.06	+1.85
Labor	Laura Hughes	37,666	32.94	−1.85
National hold		Swing	+1.85	

=== Newcastle ===
2025 Australian federal election: Newcastle
Party	Candidate	Votes	%	±%
Labor	Sharon Claydon	49,054	45.31	+1.25
Greens	Charlotte McCabe	24,061	22.22	+2.21
Liberal	Asarri McPhee	20,638	19.06	−5.23
One Nation	Phillip Heyne	5,789	5.35	+0.83
Trumpet of Patriots	Jennifer Stefanac	3,861	3.57	+2.53
Family First	Jason Briggs	2,319	2.14	+2.14
Socialist Alliance	Steve O'Brien	1,656	1.53	+1.53
	Robert Creech	888	0.82	+0.82
Total formal votes		108,266	93.00	−1.57
Informal votes		8,145	7.00	+1.57
Turnout		116,411	92.22	+1.52
Notional two-party-preferred count
Labor	Sharon Claydon	76,644	70.79	+2.85
Liberal	Asarri McPhee	31,622	29.21	−2.85
Two-candidate-preferred result
Labor	Sharon Claydon	71,244	65.80	−2.14
Greens	Charlotte McCabe	37,022	34.20	+34.20
Labor hold		Swing	–2.14	

=== Page ===
2025 Australian federal election: Page
Party	Candidate	Votes	%	±%
National	Kevin Hogan	48,049	44.66	−0.78
Labor	Wendy Backhous	23,711	22.04	+3.46
Greens	Luke Robinson	16,265	15.12	+6.69
One Nation	Peter Nottle	6,132	5.70	+0.31
Trumpet of Patriots	Donna Lee Pike	2,932	2.73	+1.97
Shooters, Fishers, Farmers	Josh Pianca	2,345	2.18	+2.18
Independent	Richard Wells	2,260	2.10	+2.10
Family First	Andrew Grady	2,235	2.08	+2.08
Libertarian	Brenton Williams	1,495	1.39	−2.34
Independent	Jordan Colless	1,431	1.33	+1.33
Citizens	Jennifer Baker	739	0.69	+0.69
Total formal votes		107,594	90.61	−2.45
Informal votes		11,145	9.39	+2.45
Turnout		118,739	91.78	+1.33
Two-party-preferred result
National	Kevin Hogan	63,788	59.29	−1.36
Labor	Wendy Backhous	43,806	40.71	+1.36
National hold		Swing	−1.36	

=== Parkes ===
2025 Australian federal election: Parkes
Party	Candidate	Votes	%	±%
National	Jamie Chaffey	41,912	39.96	−9.02
Labor	Nathan Fell	20,630	19.67	+0.14
One Nation	Mark Carter	14,320	13.65	+5.93
Shooters, Fishers, Farmers	Stephen Pope	6,776	6.46	+4.36
Greens	Trish Frail	6,404	6.11	+1.37
Libertarian	Sally Edwards	3,885	3.70	−2.66
Indigenous-Aboriginal	Bob Wilson	3,117	2.97	−1.21
Family First	Maurice Davey	2,690	2.56	+2.56
Independent	Stuart Howe	2,597	2.48	+0.44
Trumpet of Patriots	Petrus Van Der Steen	2,556	2.44	+2.44
Total formal votes		104,887	89.85	−2.43
Informal votes		11,855	10.15	+2.43
Turnout		116,742	89.22	+0.72
Two-party-preferred result
National	Jamie Chaffey	66,047	62.97	−5.18
Labor	Nathan Fell	38,840	37.03	+5.18
National hold		Swing	−5.18	

=== Parramatta ===
2025 Australian federal election: Parramatta
Party	Candidate	Votes	%	±%
Labor	Andrew Charlton	46,427	47.77	+7.63
Liberal	Katie Mullens	29,860	30.72	−6.10
Greens	Liz Tilly	11,766	12.11	+2.56
One Nation	Nicholas Matzen	2,653	2.73	+0.47
Trumpet of Patriots	Ganesh Loke	2,445	2.52	+2.51
Libertarian	Ben Somerson	1,522	1.57	−0.14
Independent	Tanya-lee Quinn	1,499	1.54	+1.54
Independent	Maa Malini	1,018	1.05	+1.05
Total formal votes		97,190	91.05	−1.20
Informal votes		9,556	8.95	+1.20
Turnout		106,746	90.85	+4.35
Two-party-preferred result
Labor	Andrew Charlton	60,790	62.55	+8.83
Liberal	Katie Mullens	36,400	37.45	−8.83
Labor hold		Swing	+8.83	

=== Paterson ===
2025 Australian federal election: Paterson
Party	Candidate	Votes	%	±%
Labor	Meryl Swanson	40,290	37.06	−2.99
Liberal	Laurence Antcliff	29,602	27.23	−10.34
Independent	Philip Penfold	10,565	9.72	+9.72
One Nation	Arnon Wither	8,254	7.59	−0.29
Greens	Paul Johns	8,219	7.56	−0.11
Legalise Cannabis	Daniel Dryden	4,223	3.88	+3.88
Trumpet of Patriots	Peter N. Arena	2,766	2.54	+2.54
Family First	Sandra Briggs	2,205	2.03	+2.03
Independent	Rod Holding	1,360	1.25	+1.25
Independent	April Maree Scott	1,220	1.12	+1.12
Total formal votes		108,704	91.61	−3.41
Informal votes		9,957	8.39	+3.41
Turnout		118,661	92.76	+4.39
Two-party-preferred result
Labor	Meryl Swanson	61,841	56.89	+4.29
Liberal	Laurence Antcliff	46,863	43.11	−4.29
Labor hold		Swing	+4.29	

=== Reid ===
2025 Australian federal election: Reid
Party	Candidate	Votes	%	±%
Labor	Sally Sitou	49,166	48.57	+6.96
Liberal	Grange Chung	32,107	31.72	−6.17
Greens	Joanna Somerville	11,680	11.54	+2.17
Independent	Steven Commerford	3,098	3.06	+3.06
One Nation	Gina Ingrouille	2,352	2.32	+0.28
Trumpet of Patriots	David Sarikaya	1,593	1.57	+1.57
Libertarian	Clinton Mead	1,221	1.21	−0.65
Total formal votes		101,217	94.03	+0.52
Informal votes		6,426	5.97	−0.52
Turnout		107,643	91.37	+0.85
Two-party-preferred result
Labor	Sally Sitou	62,762	62.01	+6.82
Liberal	Grange Chung	38,455	37.99	−6.82
Labor hold		Swing	+6.82	

=== Richmond ===
2025 Australian federal election: Richmond
Party	Candidate	Votes	%	±%
Labor	Justine Elliot	31,901	30.40	+1.60
Greens	Mandy Nolan	27,783	26.47	+1.20
National	Kimberly Hone	25,795	24.58	+1.23
One Nation	Ian Mye	5,709	5.44	+1.36
Legalise Cannabis	Vivian Mac McMahon	3,998	3.81	+3.81
People First	Richard Curtin	3,364	3.21	+3.21
Trumpet of Patriots	Phillip Peterkin	2,052	1.96	+1.96
Independent	Kevin Loughrey	1,754	1.67	+1.67
Libertarian	Ian Cherry Willis	1,619	1.54	−6.16
Independent	James Ian McKenzie	977	0.93	+0.93
Total formal votes		104,952	92.43	−0.65
Informal votes		8,600	7.57	+0.65
Turnout		113,552	89.54	+3.24
Two-party-preferred result
Labor	Justine Elliot	62,975	60.00	+1.77
National	Kimberly Hone	41,977	40.00	−1.77
Labor hold		Swing	+1.77	

=== Riverina ===
2025 Australian federal election: Riverina
Party	Candidate	Votes	%	±%
National	Michael McCormack	42,678	40.32	+5.93
Labor	Mark Jeffreson	19,506	18.43	−6.50
One Nation	Mark Craig	10,427	9.85	+2.50
Independent	Jenny Rolfe	6,909	6.53	+6.53
Independent	James Gooden	5,080	4.80	+4.80
Greens	Pheonix Valxori	4,767	4.50	−2.24
Shooters, Fishers, Farmers	Desiree Gregory	4,217	3.98	−0.09
Libertarian	Christine Onley	2,338	2.21	−3.53
Citizens	Richard Foley	2,233	2.11	+2.11
Family First	Mark Burge	2,151	2.03	+2.03
Independent	Grant Hardwick	1,861	1.76	+1.76
Independent	Barbara Baikie	1,858	1.76	+1.76
Independent	Jake Davis	1,812	1.71	+1.71
Total formal votes		105,837	88.73	−4.21
Informal votes		13,443	11.27	+4.21
Turnout		119,280	92.80	+1.11
Two-party-preferred result
National	Michael McCormack	66,276	62.62	+2.91
Labor	Mark Jeffreson	39,561	37.38	−2.91
National hold		Swing	+2.91	

=== Robertson ===
2025 Australian federal election: Robertson
Party	Candidate	Votes	%	±%
Labor	Gordon Reid	45,411	44.76	+7.12
Liberal	Lucy Wicks	30,831	30.39	−9.58
Greens	Cheryl Wallace	9,119	8.99	−1.03
One Nation	Matt Lloyd	7,032	6.93	+3.09
Legalise Cannabis	Tom Lillicrap	3,497	3.45	+3.45
Independent	Lisa Bellamy	3,376	3.33	+3.33
Trumpet of Patriots	David Borg	2,197	2.17	+1.94
Total formal votes		101,463	95.41	+1.53
Informal votes		4,876	4.59	−1.53
Turnout		106,339	92.53	+1.58
Two-party-preferred result
Labor	Gordon Reid	60,235	59.37	+7.14
Liberal	Lucy Wicks	41,228	40.63	−7.14
Labor hold		Swing	+7.14	

=== Shortland ===
2025 Australian federal election: Shortland
Party	Candidate	Votes	%	±%
Labor	Pat Conroy	48,222	44.61	+4.45
Liberal	Emma King	28,331	26.21	−4.96
Greens	Therese Doyle	12,257	11.34	+1.43
One Nation	Barry Reed	9,813	9.08	+2.66
Independent	James Pheils	4,805	4.44	+4.44
Family First	Pietro Di Girolamo	2,958	2.74	+2.74
Libertarian	Geoffrey Robertson	1,722	1.59	−1.30
Total formal votes		108,108	94.14	+0.27
Informal votes		6,731	5.86	−0.27
Turnout		114,839	93.39	+2.22
Two-party-preferred result
Labor	Pat Conroy	66,494	61.51	+5.51
Liberal	Emma King	41,614	38.49	−5.51
Labor hold		Swing	+5.51	

=== Sydney ===
2025 Australian federal election: Sydney
Party	Candidate	Votes	%	±%
Labor	Tanya Plibersek	59,153	55.15	+4.10
Greens	Luc Velez	23,162	21.60	−1.12
Liberal	Alex Xu	18,860	17.59	−1.77
One Nation	Vedran Torbarac	3,698	3.45	+1.68
Socialist Alliance	Rachel Evans	2,376	2.22	+0.97
Total formal votes		107,249	96.27	−0.31
Informal votes		4,161	3.73	+0.31
Turnout		111,410	87.42	−2.46
Notional two-party-preferred count
Labor	Tanya Plibersek	83,737	78.08	+2.42
Liberal	Alex Xu	23,512	21.92	−2.42
Two-candidate-preferred result
Labor	Tanya Plibersek	76,089	70.95	+4.73
Greens	Luc Velez	31,160	29.05	−4.73
Labor hold		Swing	+4.73	

=== Warringah ===
2025 Australian federal election: Warringah
Party	Candidate	Votes	%	±%
Independent	Zali Steggall	45,590	39.68	+7.16
Liberal	Jaimee Rogers	36,446	31.72	−2.55
Labor	Celine Varghese-Fell	16,738	14.57	+2.60
Greens	Bonnie Harvey	10,051	8.75	+0.87
One Nation	Gavin Wright	1,978	1.72	−0.06
Libertarian	Sean McLeod	1,504	1.31	+0.98
Trumpet of Patriots	Anthony Rose	1,417	1.23	+1.23
Independent	David Spratt	1,171	1.02	+1.02
Total formal votes		114,895	95.42	−1.15
Informal votes		5,520	4.58	+1.15
Turnout		120,415	92.09	+1.81
Notional two-party-preferred count
Labor	Celine Varghese-Fell	62,634	54.51	+5.25
Liberal	Jaimee Rogers	52,261	45.49	−5.25
Two-candidate-preferred result
Independent	Zali Steggall	70,318	61.20	+0.67
Liberal	Jaimee Rogers	44,577	38.80	−0.67
Independent hold		Swing	+0.67	

=== Watson ===
2025 Australian federal election: Watson
Party	Candidate	Votes	%	±%
Labor	Tony Burke	39,763	48.00	−6.11
Liberal	Zakir Alam	12,585	15.19	−11.23
Independent	Ziad Basyouny	12,209	14.74	+14.74
Greens	Jocelyn Brewer	7,399	8.93	+1.82
Libertarian	Vanessa Hadchiti	3,559	4.30	+4.30
One Nation	Elisha Trevena	2,674	3.23	−2.06
Trumpet of Patriots	John Koukoulis	2,162	2.61	+2.61
Family First	John Mannah	1,428	1.72	+1.72
Independent	Zain Khan	1,055	1.27	+1.27
Total formal votes		82,834	82.99	−6.38
Informal votes		16,983	17.01	+6.38
Turnout		99,817	85.73	+2.41
Notional two-party-preferred count
Labor	Tony Burke	60,352	72.86	+7.70
Liberal	Zakir Alam	22,482	27.14	−7.70
Two-candidate-preferred result
Labor	Tony Burke	55,099	66.52	+1.36
Independent	Ziad Basyouny	27,735	33.48	+33.48
Labor hold		Swing	+1.36	

=== Wentworth ===
2025 Australian federal election: Wentworth
Party	Candidate	Votes	%	±%
Independent	Allegra Spender	40,284	36.48	+7.22
Liberal	Ro Knox	40,155	36.36	−1.17
Labor	Savanna Peake	14,779	13.38	−4.35
Greens	Nick Ward	11,241	10.18	−0.53
One Nation	James Sternhell	2,625	2.38	+1.17
Independent	Michael Richmond	1,347	1.22	+1.22
Total formal votes		110,431	97.26	−0.12
Informal votes		3,106	2.74	+0.12
Turnout		113,537	89.07	+0.50
Notional two-party-preferred count
Labor	Savanna Peake	55,829	50.56	+1.72
Liberal	Ro Knox	54,602	49.44	−1.72
Two-candidate-preferred result
Independent	Allegra Spender	64,429	58.34	+8.92
Liberal	Ro Knox	46,002	41.66	−8.92
Independent hold		Swing	+8.92	

=== Werriwa ===
2025 Australian federal election: Werriwa
Party	Candidate	Votes	%	±%
Labor	Anne Stanley	35,785	40.84	+1.71
Liberal	Sam Kayal	27,003	30.82	−0.08
Greens	Janet Castle	9,747	11.12	+4.48
One Nation	Ian Cimera	3,499	3.99	−0.99
Legalise Cannabis	Andrew Murphy	3,005	3.43	+3.43
Libertarian	Gemma Noiosi	2,802	3.20	−5.92
Independent	Jamal Daoud	2,232	2.55	+2.55
Trumpet of Patriots	Shannon McGlone	1,800	2.05	+2.05
Family First	Jacob Balestri	1,741	1.99	+1.99
Total formal votes		87,614	82.74	−7.08
Informal votes		18,274	17.26	+7.08
Turnout		105,888	89.90	+7.39
Two-party-preferred result
Labor	Anne Stanley	49,741	56.77	+1.43
Liberal	Sam Kayal	37,873	43.23	−1.43
Labor hold		Swing	+1.43	

=== Whitlam ===
2025 Australian federal election: Whitlam
Party	Candidate	Votes	%	±%
Labor	Carol Berry	42,230	38.63	−3.76
Liberal	Nathaniel Smith	30,908	28.27	−1.56
Greens	Jamie Dixon	13,558	12.40	+1.96
One Nation	Sharon Cousins	8,379	7.66	+0.78
Independent	Ben Britton	5,246	4.80	+4.80
Trumpet of Patriots	Angelo Cuda	3,101	2.84	+2.84
Independent	Paddy Moylan	2,211	2.02	+2.02
Independent	Glenn Butterfield	1,905	1.74	+1.74
Libertarian	Raymond Khoury	1,188	1.09	−2.42
Citizens	Cheryl Hinton	590	0.54	+0.54
Total formal votes		109,316	90.18	−5.06
Informal votes		11,909	9.82	+5.06
Turnout		121,225	93.18	+4.12
Two-party-preferred result
Labor	Carol Berry	61,486	56.25	−2.06
Liberal	Nathaniel Smith	47,830	43.75	+2.06
Labor hold		Swing	−2.06	
