= 2005 Werriwa by-election =

- 19 March 2005

Division of Werriwa (NSW) in the House of Representatives

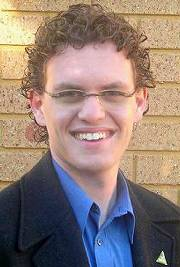
	First party	Second party
		IND
Candidate	Chris Hayes	James Young
Party	Labor	Ind. Liberal
Primary vote	37,286	5,237
Percentage	55.54%	7.80%
Swing	▲55.54	▲7.80
TCP	70.05%	29.95%
TCP swing	▲10.74	▲29.95
	Third party	Fourth party
		AAFI
Candidate	Ben Raue	Janey Woodger
Party	Greens	AAFI
Primary vote	3,726	3,243
Percentage	5.55%	4.83%
Swing	▲2.42	▲4.83
MP before election
Mark Latham
Labor
Elected MP
Chris Hayes
Labor

The 2005 Werriwa by-election was held on 19 March 2005 to elect the member for Werriwa in the Australian House of Representatives, following the resignation of Labor Party MP Mark Latham.

Latham had represented Werriwa since 1994 and served as the opposition leader from December 2003, leading Labor to defeat at the 2004 federal election. He had become increasingly dissatisfied with politics and was struggling with recurring pancreatitis. He announced his resignation from parliament on 18 January 2005.

The governing Liberal and National Coalition chose not to contest the by-election, as Werriwa had long been considered a safe Labor seat; Labor has held it for all but nine years since 1906. Nevertheless, the by-election received substantial public attention, due to both the surprise nature of Latham's resignation and a brutal Labor preselection battle between two potential candidates. This resulted in the drafting of a compromise candidate, industrial mediator Chris Hayes. Labor increased their margin with 55.4 percent of the primary vote and 70.1 percent of the two-candidate-preferred vote. All of the 15 remaining candidates received a primary vote of less than 10 percent.

== Background ==
Latham was first elected to Werriwa at a 1994 by-election following the retirement of former treasurer John Kerin. Latham was easily re-elected to Werriwa at the next four subsequent elections: in 1996, 1998, 2001 and 2004.

Latham was promoted to the frontbench as Shadow Minister for Education in 1997, but resigned from the Shadow Cabinet in 1998 after a policy dispute with then-leader Kim Beazley, and had been a dissident backbencher for five years thereafter. He rose to sudden prominence again in 2003 after the forced resignation of Beazley's successor and Latham's friend and ally, Simon Crean, as leader. It was widely assumed that Beazley would retake his former position as Labor leader, but Latham nominated for the position, and in a surprise result, was successful by 47 votes to 45.

Latham served as Opposition Leader for an eventful thirteen months, initially revitalising the party and opening an election-winning lead in the polls before the October 2004 election, but slipping behind during the election campaign after a series of gaffes and a successful government scare campaign on interest rates. This resulted in a net loss of seats, and the party's worst result since 1996. A devastated Latham largely disappeared from public life in the wake of the election defeat, and was widely criticised for failing to reappear or make any public comment in the wake of the December 2004 tsunami. It was revealed that he was suffering from pancreatitis, a condition which had dogged him through his time as leader, but after repeatedly failing to reappear in public and after nearly a month of questions as to his whereabouts, he announced his resignation from politics on 18 January, thus creating the need for a by-election in his seat of Werriwa.

== Preselection ==
The local branches in and around Werriwa had been the scene of major branch-stacking battles throughout the 1990s and early 2000s, due largely to preselection battles over the state seat of Liverpool, and as such, Labor's Werriwa Federal Electorate Council, which would normally select the candidate, had been "put on ice" since 2003. As a result, the party's left and right factions agreed to hold a ballot among the state's 34-member administrative committee to select the candidate.

Two main candidates were touted for the Labor nomination: Brenton Banfield, the then-mayor of Campbelltown, and Steven Chaytor, a City of Campbelltown councillor and aide to former prime minister Gough Whitlam. Paul Lynch, the state MP for Liverpool, and former federal minister Michael Lee were both briefly touted as potential candidates, but were soon ruled out.

Banfield emerged as an early favourite in the preselection, having been a popular mayor with a high profile in the area, and having been reportedly asked to nominate by the party's head office. The campaign got increasingly nasty, with supporters of Banfield and Chaytor clashing, which reached a peak when supporters of Chaytor launched a public attack on Banfield for having defended sex offenders through his work as a solicitor, though Banfield had been professionally obligated to do so. This reportedly raised concerns among party insiders that Banfield could become a liability after doing polling on the issue, and began looking for a consensus candidate instead.

This emerged in the form of Chris Hayes, an industrial mediator and former assistant secretary of the Australian Workers' Union with no prior political background. He nominated at the end of January, receiving strong support from the party's head office, and Banfield and Chaytor came under pressure to withdraw before the close of nominations on 1 February; Banfield doing so on 31 January, and Chaytor following the next day. Hayes was thus the sole nominee at the close of nominations, and was confirmed as the party's candidate on 2 February.

== Campaign ==
Although early polling in January had suggested that there was a reasonable possibility of a Liberal win should the party contest the seat, the party refused to speculate if they would nominate a candidate until mid-February, and finally ruled it out on 18 February. There had been some speculation that former rugby player Paul Langmack would nominate as a star candidate for the Liberals, but he had announced that he would not run on 7 February. The decision by the Liberal Party not to run changed the dynamics of the race significantly, as with the only threat now from minor parties and independents, Labor became the solid favourite to retain the seat.

In total, 16 candidates nominated for the by-election – the most since the 1992 Wills by-election and until the 2009 Bradfield by-election. The by-election included candidates from the Australian Greens, Family First Party, Christian Democratic Party, One Nation, Progressive Labour Party and Australians Against Further Immigration. Nine independents were among them, including Independent Liberal James Young, self-confessed former Labor branchstacker Sam Bargshoon, and radio presenter Mal Lees, who ran on a joke platform of free beer. Police whistleblower Deborah Locke, an endorsed People Power candidate, was forced to run as an independent due to her party's failure to re-register in time. Most of the independent and minor candidates joined in an "anyone but Labor" campaign, with Young and Locke considered the most likely challengers during the campaign.

A variety of issues were raised in the campaign; the poor state of public transport in the region, hospital waiting lists, the state of the region's high schools, interest rates, a lack of infrastructure in newer suburbs, and anger over the then-recent 2005 Macquarie Fields riots. Much of the campaign was focused on personality and name recognition; Greens candidate Ben Raue commented "There really haven't been any debates about policies – it's been more about getting your face out to the people."

== Results ==
2005 Werriwa by-election
Party	Candidate	Votes	%	±%
Labor	Chris Hayes	37,286	55.54	+2.90
Independent Liberal	James Young	5,237	7.80	+7.80
Greens	Ben Raue	3,726	5.55	+2.42
AAFI	Janey Woodger	3,243	4.83	+4.83
Family First	Mick Sykes	2,890	4.31	+4.31
Independent Liberal	Joe Bryant	2,696	4.02	+4.02
Christian Democrats	Greg Tan	2,536	3.78	+3.78
One Nation	Charles Doggett	2,400	3.48	+1.22
People Power	Deborah Locke	2,101	3.13	+3.13
Independent	Mal Lees	1,393	2.08	+2.08
Independent	Ned Mannoun	1,076	1.60	+1.60
Independent	Sam Bargshoon	753	1.12	−3.75
Progressive Labour	Mary Patricia McGookin	629	0.94	+0.94
Socialist Equality	Mike Head	458	0.68	+0.04
Independent	Marc Aussie-Stone	388	0.58	+0.58
Independent	Robert Vogler	316	0.47	+0.47
Total formal votes		67,129	86.85	−5.17
Informal votes		10,162	13.15	+5.17
Turnout		77,291	85.19	−8.73
Two-candidate-preferred result
Labor	Chris Hayes	47,023	70.05	+10.74
Independent Liberal	James Young	20,106	29.95	+29.95
Labor hold				

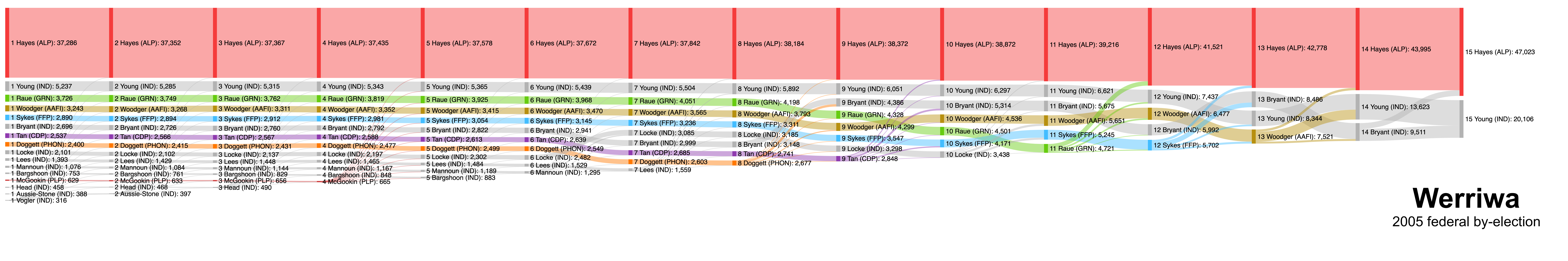
The distribution of preferences in the by-election resulted in the election of Chris Hayes.

The by-election, as largely expected in the absence of a Liberal candidate, resulted in an easy victory for Labor candidate Chris Hayes. Hayes polled 55.5% of the primary vote, with his nearest challenger being independent Liberal Young on 7.8%, ahead of Green Raue on 5.5%. Locke, despite some predictions of an upset victory, polled only 3.1%. Hayes was able to claim victory on the day of the by-election, and was subsequently sworn in as a member of the House of Representatives. Steven Chaytor, who had stepped aside for Hayes in preselection, later served as a member of the New South Wales Legislative Assembly from 2005 to 2007.

== See also ==
- Electoral results for the Division of Werriwa
- List of Australian federal by-elections
