= 1994 Werriwa by-election =

- 29 January 1994
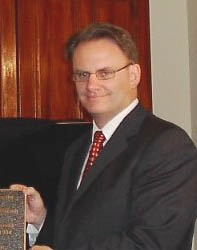

	First party	Second party
Candidate	Mark Latham	Charlie Lynn
Party	Labor	Liberal
Popular vote	30,337	20,466
Percentage	50.13%	33.82%
Swing	▼11.17	▲3.52
TPP	59.49%	40.51%
TPP swing	▼6.28	▲6.28
MP before election
John Kerin
Labor
Elected MP
Mark Latham
Labor

A by-election for the Australian House of Representatives division of Werriwa was held on 29 January 1994. It was triggered by the resignation of sitting Labor Party member and former minister John Kerin.

The by-election was won by Labor Party candidate Mark Latham, retaining the seat for his party.

The by-election was marked by a swing against the ALP of almost twelve per cent. Much of this swing benefited minor party candidates, in particular the anti-immigration party Australians Against Further Immigration, whose candidate Robyn Spencer polled 7.24 per cent. Single issue parties are rarely able to sustain such high votes at a general election.

Due to its status as a safe ALP seat, the Liberal Party originally decided not to field a candidate in this by-election but it was overruled by leader John Hewson and saw Charlie Lynn becoming the Liberal candidate by being handpicked by Hewson rather than going through the usual rank and file preselection process.

== Results ==
1994 Werriwa by-election
Party	Candidate	Votes	%	±%
Labor	Mark Latham	30,337	50.13	−11.27
Liberal	Charlie Lynn	20,466	33.82	+3.52
AAFI	Robyn Spencer	4,384	7.24	+7.24
Independent	Julia Moon	3,199	5.29	+5.29
	Graeme MacAllister	1,111	1.84	+1.84
Independent	Maxwill Corbett	458	0.76	+0.76
Independent	Alex Kammoun	378	0.62	+0.62
Independent	Earle Keegel	188	0.31	+0.31
Total formal votes		60,521	94.80	−1.20
Informal votes		3,318	5.20	+1.20
Turnout		63,839	85.64	−9.66
Two-party-preferred result
Labor	Mark Latham	35,972	59.49	−6.28
Liberal	Charlie Lynn	24,500	40.51	+6.28
Labor hold		Swing	−6.28	

== Aftermath ==
Two years later, Latham was re-elected as the member for Werriwa at the 1996 federal election, despite the Labor Party losing several seats—and as a consequence, losing office—including the neighbouring divisions of Lindsay, Hughes and Macarthur. In December 2003, Latham became Leader of the Opposition and led his party to defeat at the 2004 federal election. Although re-elected as leader in the aftermath of that election, in January 2005 he stepped down as Labor leader and the member for Werriwa citing health concerns, triggering the 2005 Werriwa by-election.

Latham's defeated opponent, Charlie Lynn of the Liberal Party, was selected to the New South Wales Legislative Council in 1995 filling a vacancy caused by the resignation of Ted Pickering.

== See also ==
- List of Australian federal by-elections
