= Tu Le =

Australian lawyer and political candidate

Tu Le in 2026 at the Addison Road Community Centre, Marrickville

Tu Le is an Australian lawyer and political candidate for the Australian Labor Party. Her candidacy became notable in 2021 when a local preselection process in Fowler, an electorate in Sydney, was halted in favour of choosing Senator Kristina Keneally. Le appeared in the media along with criticism of her party for promoting a political insider and failing to reflect a multicultural community, contributing to the otherwise safe seat being lost to independent Dai Le at the 2022 federal election. In 2024, Le was selected as the Labor challenger for the same seat in the 2025 federal election, but was unsuccessful.

== Legal and community work ==
Le was born in south-west Sydney, her parents being Vietnamese refugees fleeing from the Vietnam War. She graduated from Macquarie University with a Bachelor of Commerce and Bachelor of Laws. She was admitted as a lawyer in 2016.

In 2019, she managed a migrant employment legal service and co-founded a youth group. She went on to co-create the Vietnamese Australian Forum. She later joined the board of a human rights charity and was elected deputy chair of Asian Women at Work. She became an executive member of the Vietnamese Australian Lawyers Association. In 2021, she began working as a community education lawyer for a legal centre in Marrickville.

Le was recognised for her community work as the 2022 winner of the Asian Australian Leadership Awards. The organisers argued that her advocacy put the lack of Asian Australian political representation on the national agenda.

== Political candidacies ==
=== 2022 federal candidacy ===
In 2021, Le was endorsed by retiring MP for Fowler Chris Hayes as his preferred successor. Hayes worked with Le and felt she had strong links to the community and would reflect the cultural diversity of the area which included over 50,000 Asian-Australians as of the 2016 census. The preselection process was halted in favour of Kristina Keneally, a former premier of New South Wales and experienced senator who due to union influence, required repositioning from the upper house into a safe Labor seat in the lower house. Though Keneally nominally moved to the seat, she had no roots within the working-class electorate and was a resident of the Northern Beaches area of Sydney. The decision was picked up by international news media as demonstrative of Australian political class prejudices. To diffuse the controversy, Labor appeared to be promising Le a seat in the New South Wales parliament at a later election. The sidelining of Le for an American-born woman in a seat primarily made up of people of Asian background and many refugees was criticised by Labor MPs such as Anne Aly and Peter Khalil.

Independent Dai Le, herself a Vietnamese refugee, was able to capitalise on the controversy and defeated Keneally in one of only two Labor losses at the 2022 federal election. Immediately after the defeat, the Cabramatta branch of the Labor party, sought to expel Tu Le for her public criticism of the party and undermining their election campaign.

=== 2023 state candidacy ===
Le ran for preselection to be the Labor candidate in the 2023 New South Wales state election to replace Nick Lalich, the retiring member for Cabramatta with a promise by the party to not interfere with the local preselection vote. The local branch endorsed Tri Vo, ahead of Le and Kate Hoang, who went on to win the seat.

=== 2025 federal candidacy ===
In October 2024, Labor Prime Minister Anthony Albanese visited Cabramatta to announce Le as the Labor candidate for Fowler in the 2025 election. To distinguish herself from the incumbent independent Dai Le, Tu Le said the people of Fowler "deserve a voice in the Labor government", however no reference was made to past political events. Le started campaigning while pregnant and gave birth to her second child in March 2025, just prior to the election.

Given the possibility of a hung parliament, Le argued her independent opponent may back a Liberal government that has little direct support in the local community. Dai Le argued her opponent lacked experience and the electorate's main concern is the cost of living. Despite obtaining a 0.9% improvement in Labor's primary vote, Le's candidacy was unsuccessful. The incumbent retained her seat in parliament after voting preferences were applied.
