= Julia Irwin =

Australian politician

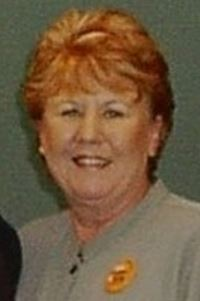
- Irwin in 2005

Member of the Australian Parliament for Fowler
- In office 3 October 1998 – 19 July 2010
- Preceded by: Ted Grace
- Succeeded by: Chris Hayes

Personal details
- Born: Julia Claire Welsh; 8 November 1951 (age 75) Sydney, New South Wales, Australia
- Party: Labor
- Spouse: Geoff Irwin
- Occupation: Politician

Julia Claire Irwin (née Welsh; born 8 November 1951) is a former Australian politician. She represented the Australian Labor Party (ALP) in the House of Representatives from 1998 to 2010, holding the New South Wales seat of Fowler.

== Early life ==
Irwin was born in Sydney on 8 November 1951. Her father Alan Welsh served on the Parramatta City Council and her mother Lois Welsh was the secretary of the New South Wales Labor Women's Committee. She joined the ALP at the age of 15 and began her involvement in the labour movement with the Sheet Metal Working Industrial Union. She was also involved in Young Labor where she met her future husband Geoff Irwin.

In 1975, Irwin became the electorate secretary to Jack Ferguson, who became the Deputy Premier of New South Wales the following year. She later worked as a staffer for Richard Klugman, Ross Free, and Ted Grace.

== Parliament ==
Following Ted Grace's retirement, Irwin won ALP preselection for his seat of Fowler. She retained the seat for Labor at the 1998 federal election, and was re-elected on three further occasions.

In 2005 Irwin was involved in a controversy over comments she made about Israel. On 13 September she made a speech in parliament characterising Israel's policies as "ethnic cleansing" and Gaza as a "concentration camp". After criticism from Jewish groups and by members of both the Liberal and Labor parties, she issued an apology for her "offensive" language.

In October 2008 Irwin publicly criticised the Rudd Government's education policy, accusing it of "locking in the Coalition's favouritism of private schools".

Irwin announced in September 2009 that she would not recontest her seat at the 2010 federal election.

Parliament of Australia
Preceded by Ted Grace	Member for Fowler; 1998–2010	Succeeded by Chris Hayes
