= Ted Grace =

Australian politician (1931–2020)

Member of the Australian Parliament for Fowler
- In office 1 December 1984 – 31 August 1998
- Preceded by: New seat
- Succeeded by: Julia Irwin

Personal details
- Born: 13 March 1931 Swansea, Wales
- Died: 22 August 2020 (aged 89)
- Party: Australian Labor Party
- Occupation: Air-conditioning consultant

Edward Laurence Grace (13 March 1931 – 22 August 2020) was an Australian politician. He represented the Australian Labor Party (ALP) in the House of Representatives from 1984 to 1998, holding the New South Wales seat of Fowler.

== Early life ==
Grace was born on 13 March 1931 in Swansea, Wales. He served in the British Merchant Navy before moving to Australia, where he became a self-employed air-conditioning consultant in Sydney. He served on the Fairfield City Council from 1977 to 1985 and was also a board member of the Prospect County Council electricity utility, including as chair from 1981 to 1984.

== Politics ==
Grace was elected to parliament at the 1984 federal election, and subsequently re-elected on four occasions. He retired at the 1998 election and was succeeded by his former staffer Julia Irwin.

Grace served as an ALP whip from 1990 to 1998. He also served on various standing committees, including as chair of the members' interests committee from 1993 to 1996. He was president of the Australian-Croatian Parliamentary Friendship Group. In 1992, he and Brian Courtice were the only two members of an ALP caucus committee to oppose allowing gay people to serve in the Australian Defence Force.

Parliament of Australia
New seat	Member for Fowler; 1984–1998	Succeeded by Julia Irwin
