= Division of Fowler =

Australian federal electoral division

Coordinates: 33.900°S 150.877°E

Fowler Australian House of Representatives Division
- Interactive map of electorate boundaries from the 2025 federal election
- Created: 1984
- MP: Dai Le
- Party: Independent (Note: Although Le is a member of Western Sydney Community, she continues to sit as an independent in parliament.)
- Namesake: Lilian Fowler
- Electors: 119,999 (2025)
- Area: 62 km^{2} (23.9 sq mi)
- Demographic: Outer metropolitan
Electorates around Fowler:
McMahon	McMahon	Blaxland
Werriwa	Fowler	Watson
Werriwa	Hughes	Banks

The Division of Fowler is an Australian electoral division in the state of New South Wales.

Fowler is based in Sydney's outer southwestern suburbs around Liverpool and Cabramatta.

Fowler is a diverse electorate, containing large immigrant communities of Vietnamese and Chinese ancestry. According to the 2021 census, 39.1% of electors were born in Australia, 16.0% were born in Vietnam and 2.0% were born in China (excluding SARs and Taiwan). At the time of the 2022 Australian federal election, 16% of Fowler's population possessed Vietnamese ancestry, and 11% possessed Chinese heritage.

The current MP is Dai Le, who was elected as an independent in 2022. She is the first non-Labor politician to represent Fowler. Le has strong links to the Vietnamese community in Fowler; she was born in Vietnam and migrated to Australia as an eleven year old after three years in a Philippines refugee camp.

== Geography ==
The division is located in the southwestern Sydney in parts of the local government areas of Liverpool and Fairfield, including the suburbs of Bossley Park, Cabramatta, Cabramatta West, Canley Heights, Chipping Norton, Edensor Park, Fairfield East, Greenfield Park, Liverpool, St Johns Park, Wakeley, and Warwick Farm; as well as parts of Abbotsbury, Bonnyrigg, Canley Vale, Carramar, Fairfield, Fairfield West, Guildford, Moorebank, Mount Pritchard, Prairiewood, Wetherill Park and Yennora.

Since 1984, federal electoral division boundaries in Australia have been determined at redistributions by a redistribution committee appointed by the Australian Electoral Commission. Redistributions occur for the boundaries of divisions in a particular state, and they occur every seven years, or sooner if a state's representation entitlement changes or when divisions of a state are malapportioned.

== History ==
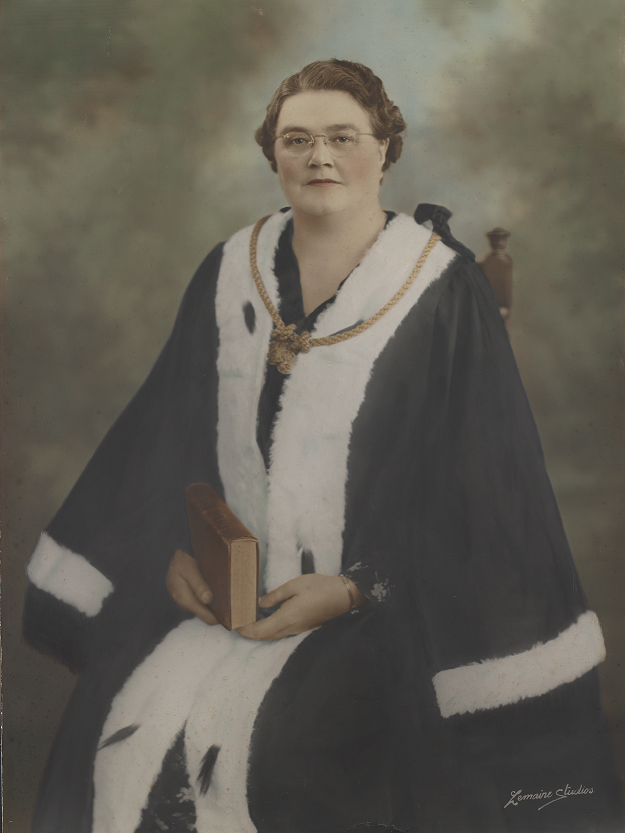
Lilian Fowler, the division's namesake

The division was created in 1984 and is named after Lilian Fowler, the first female mayor in Australia.

The member for Fowler from the 2010 federal election to the 2022 federal election has been Chris Hayes, a member of the Australian Labor Party.

=== 2022 election ===
After announcing that he would retire at the 2022 federal election, Hayes endorsed Tu Le, a locally resident lawyer, to succeed him. A factional dispute involving winnable seats on the Senate ticket saw Senator Kristina Keneally parachuted into the election for the "safe" seat in order to resolve the dispute. It would also allow Keneally to serve on the ministerial or shadow frontbench following the election. Keneally's move was heavily criticised both in the community and within the party for her decision to usurp the position of a local candidate, with Keneally living on Scotland Island on Sydney's Northern Beaches, over an hour's drive from the electorate.

Dai Le, a local independent who was serving as the deputy mayor of the Fairfield City Council announced her intention to stand for the seat. Le had been a Liberal Party member earlier in her career until her expulsion from the party as her bid for mayor breached party rules regarding running against an endorsed candidate.

Le won the seat after a significant swing against Labor. Keneally's higher first preference vote was not high enough to prevent Le from winning on the two-candidate-preferred count. After Le relegated the Liberal Party to third place, she received most preferences from the voters of three right-wing minor parties and some Greens voters. When the majority of Liberal voter preferences also flowed to Le, she overtook the primary vote of Labor, ending their run of 13 consecutive victories in Fowler.

In April 2025, Anthony Albanese visited Cabramatta Public School with Tu Le, who became the Labor candidate. During that visit he conceded that selecting Keneally for Fowler was a mistake.

== Demographics ==
=== Population ===
The population as at the 2021 Census in the division of Fowler was 173,523 people.

People Persons count based on place of usual residence on Census night	Fowler	%
Male	85,684	49.4
Female	87,839	50.6
Total	173,523	100

The Division of Fowler is one of Australia's most multicultural communities with a very high percentage of migrants and first generation Australians. As at the 2021 Census the breakdown of country of birth was;

Country of birth	Fowler	%
Australia	67,784	39.1
Other top responses
Vietnam	17,813	16.0
Iraq	15,022	8.7
Cambodia	5,708	3.3
China (excluding SARs and Taiwan)	3,464	2.0
Syria	2,561	1.5

Fowler has a high multicultural population compared to the national and state averages. 77.3% of the population of Fowler had both parents born overseas. While the general percentage of all Australians with both parents born overseas is 36.7%.

Country of birth of parents, stated responses	Fowler	%	New South Wales	%	Australia	%
Both parents born overseas	134,212	77.3	3,181,894	39.4	9,321,603	36.7
Father only born overseas	5,811	3.3	509,789	6.3	1,670,476	6.6
Mother only born overseas	4,176	2.4	369,492	4.6	1,257,942	4.9
Both parents born in Australia	16,758	9.7	3,529,168	43.7	11,663,577	45.9

=== Median weekly income ===
The median weekly personal income for people aged 15 years and over in Fowler (Commonwealth Electoral Division) as at the 2021 Census was lower than the national and state averages.

Median weekly incomes People aged 15 years and over	Fowler	New South Wales	Australia
Personal	521	813	805
Family	1,529	2,185	2,120
Household	1,403	1,829	1,746

=== Employment ===
There were 62,077 people who reported being in the labour force in the week before census night in Fowler (Commonwealth Electoral Division). Of these, 47.8% were employed full time, 26.3% were employed part-time and 8.6% were unemployed. Unemployment is significantly higher that the New South Wales state average of 4.9% and the national average of 5.1%

Employment People who reported being in the labour force, aged 15 years and over	Fowler	%	New South Wales	%	Australia	%
Worked full-time	29,681	47.8	2,136,610	55.2	7,095,103	55.9
Worked part-time	16,320	26.3	2,136,610	29.7	3,962,550	31.2
Away from work	10,723	17.3	395,888	10.2	991,758	7.8
Unemployed	5,354	8.6	189,852	4.9	646,442	5.1

== Members ==
Image	Member	Party	Term	Notes
	Ted Grace (1931–2020)	Labor	1 December 1984 – 31 August 1998	Retired
	Julia Irwin (1951–)	Labor	3 October 1998 – 19 July 2010	Retired
	Chris Hayes (1955–)	Labor	21 August 2010 – 11 April 2022	Previously held the Division of Werriwa. Served as Chief Government Whip in the House under Gillard and Rudd. Retired
	Dai Le (1968–)	Independent	21 May 2022 – present	Incumbent

== Election results ==
2025 Australian federal election: Fowler
Party	Candidate	Votes	%	±%
Labor	Tu Le	34,909	37.56	+0.96
Independent	Dai Le	31,108	33.47	+5.18
Liberal	Vivek Singha	11,404	12.27	−5.32
Greens	Avery Howard	6,288	6.77	+1.89
One Nation	Tony Margos	3,835	4.13	+0.51
Family First	Jared Athavle	3,598	3.87	+3.87
Libertarian	Victor Tey	1,796	1.93	−0.58
Total formal votes		92,938	86.04	−3.43
Informal votes		15,079	13.96	+3.43
Turnout		108,017	90.05	+5.04
Notional two-party-preferred count
Labor	Tu Le	63,371	68.19	+12.29
Liberal	Vivek Singha	29,567	31.81	−12.29
Two-candidate-preferred result
Independent	Dai Le	48,956	52.68	+0.88
Labor	Tu Le	43,982	47.32	−0.88
Independent hold		Swing	+0.88	
