= Chris Hayes (politician) =

Australian politician (born 1955)

Member of the Australian Parliament for Fowler
- In office 21 August 2010 – 11 April 2022
- Preceded by: Julia Irwin
- Succeeded by: Dai Le

Member of the Australian Parliament for Werriwa
- In office 19 March 2005 – 21 August 2010
- Preceded by: Mark Latham
- Succeeded by: Laurie Ferguson

Personal details
- Born: Christopher Patrick Hayes; 17 July 1955 (age 71) Sydney, New South Wales, Australia
- Party: Australian Labor Party
- Spouse: Bernadette
- Children: 3
- Education: University of Sydney
- Occupation: Industrial officer
- Website: www.chrishayesmp.com

Christopher Patrick Hayes (born 17 July 1955) is a former Australian Labor Party politician who served as the member of parliament for Werriwa from 2005 to 2010 and then as the member for Fowler from 2010 to 2022, when he retired from politics.

Hayes held the position of Returning Officer for the Labor Caucus, in which he oversaw elections, including the 2013 leadership spill/ballot in June. He released the official votes between Julia Gillard and Kevin Rudd.

== Early life and education ==
Hayes was educated at De La Salle College, Revesby and University of Sydney. He has a Diploma in Labour Relations and Law. He was an industrial officer with the Public Service Professional Officers Association and then with the Australian Workers' Union from 1978 to 1995, then assistant national secretary of the Police Federation of Australia and New Zealand from 1997 to 1999. Since 1999 he has run his own business advising companies and unions on mediation issues.

== Political career ==
At the 2005 Werriwa by-election Hayes polled 55.54 percent of the primary vote, a 2.90-point increase from the October 2004 election. This was seen as a good result for Labor, although the Liberal Party did not contest the by-election. At the 2010 federal election, he moved to the seat of Fowler following a redistribution to allow Laurie Ferguson, whose seat of Reid had been substantially changed, to contest Werriwa.

Hayes, a practising Roman Catholic, was one of the few Labor MPs to publicly oppose the legislation of same-sex marriage. He voted to legalise same-sex marriage after the Australian Marriage Law Postal Survey returned a majority for "Yes", even though 63.66% of his electorate voted "No".

In October 2020, in the Federation Chamber of the Australian Parliament, while reading out a letter from his cousin who had suffered child abuse, Hayes grabbed at his heart and collapsed. Tanya Plibersek, a Labor colleague, who was sitting beside him, helped him into a chair, and Dr Mike Freelander, another Labor colleague, provided CPR, assisted by Nationals MP Dr David Gillespie. Hayes was rushed to hospital in an ambulance, and debate in the Chamber was suspended for the remainder of the day. Later, in the House of Representatives, Labor leader Anthony Albanese and Prime Minister Scott Morrison expressed their wishes for Hayes' speedy recovery.

In March 2021, Hayes announced that he would be retiring at the 2022 election.

Parliament of Australia
Preceded by Mark Latham	Member for Werriwa; 2005–2010	Succeeded by Laurie Ferguson
Preceded by Julia Irwin	Member for Fowler; 2010–2022	Succeeded by Dai Le
