= Electoral results for the Division of Hughes =

Australian division election results

This is a list of electoral results for the Division of Hughes in Australian federal elections from the division's creation in 1955 until the present.

== Members ==
Member	Party	Term
Les Johnson	Labor	1955–1966
Don Dobie	Liberal	1966–1969
Les Johnson	Labor	1969–1984
Robert Tickner	Labor	1984–1996
Danna Vale	Liberal	1996–2010
Craig Kelly	Liberal	2010–2021
Craig Kelly	Independent	2021
Craig Kelly	United Australia	2021–2022
Jenny Ware	Liberal	2022–2025
David Moncrieff	Labor	2025–present

== Election results ==
=== Elections in the 2020s ===
==== 2025 ====
2025 Australian federal election: Hughes
Party	Candidate	Votes	%	±%
Labor	David Moncrieff	38,359	39.01	+11.09
Liberal	Jenny Ware	35,842	36.45	−3.95
Greens	Catherine Dyson	11,226	11.42	+4.99
One Nation	Deborah Swinbourn	5,252	5.34	+1.89
Trumpet of Patriots	Alex Scarfone	2,777	2.82	+2.82
Family First	Nathaniel Marsh	2,379	2.42	+2.42
Libertarian	Elvis Sinosic	1,918	1.95	+1.95
Citizens	David A. W. Miller	587	0.60	+0.60
Total formal votes		98,340	91.48	−3.35
Informal votes		9,156	8.52	+3.35
Turnout		107,496	93.54	+1.45
Two-party-preferred result
Labor	David Moncrieff	52,072	52.95	+6.41
Liberal	Jenny Ware	46,268	47.05	−6.41
Labor gain from Liberal		Swing	+6.41	

Results are not final. Last updated on 24 May 2025 at 1:00 AM AEST.

==== 2022 ====
2022 Australian federal election: Hughes
Party	Candidate	Votes	%	±%
Liberal	Jenny Ware	42,148	43.49	−9.67
Labor	Riley Campbell	21,828	22.52	−7.94
Independent	Georgia Steele	13,891	14.33	+14.33
United Australia	Craig Kelly	7,186	7.42	+4.94
Greens	Pete Thompson	6,118	6.31	−0.63
Independent	Linda Seymour	3,138	3.24	+3.24
One Nation	Narelle Seymour	2,600	2.68	+2.68
Total formal votes		96,909	95.67	+0.84
Informal votes		4,387	4.33	−0.84
Turnout		101,296	94.42	−0.40
Two-party-preferred result
Liberal	Jenny Ware	55,244	57.01	−2.84
Labor	Riley Campbell	41,665	42.99	+2.84
Liberal hold		Swing	−2.84	

Alluvial diagram for preference flows in the seat of Hughes in the 2022 federal election. indicates at what stage the winning candidate had over 50% of the votes and was declared the winner.

The sitting member, Craig Kelly was elected as a Liberal, but resigned from the party in 2021, subsequently joining United Australia.

=== Elections in the 2010s ===
==== 2019 ====
2019 Australian federal election: Hughes
Party	Candidate	Votes	%	±%
Liberal	Craig Kelly	50,763	53.16	+1.19
Labor	Diedree Steinwall	29,088	30.46	−1.42
Greens	Mitchell Shakespeare	6,631	6.94	−0.43
Animal Justice	Gae Constable	2,439	2.55	−1.44
United Australia	Terrance Keep	2,366	2.48	+2.48
Christian Democrats	Leo-Ning Liu	2,216	2.32	−2.47
Independent	Matt Bryan	1,988	2.08	+2.08
Total formal votes		95,491	94.83	−0.77
Informal votes		5,208	5.17	+0.77
Turnout		100,699	94.82	+0.88
Two-party-preferred result
Liberal	Craig Kelly	57,149	59.85	+0.52
Labor	Diedree Steinwall	38,342	40.15	−0.52
Liberal hold		Swing	+0.52	

==== 2016 ====
2016 Australian federal election: Hughes
Party	Candidate	Votes	%	±%
Liberal	Craig Kelly	48,734	51.97	−3.59
Labor	Diedree Steinwall	29,895	31.88	+2.21
Greens	Phil Smith	6,912	7.37	+1.50
Christian Democrats	Michael Caudre	4,490	4.79	+2.00
Animal Justice	Ellie Robertson	3,745	3.99	+3.99
Total formal votes		93,776	95.60	+1.88
Informal votes		4,314	4.40	−1.88
Turnout		98,090	93.94	−2.45
Two-party-preferred result
Liberal	Craig Kelly	55,633	59.33	−2.48
Labor	Diedree Steinwall	38,143	40.67	+2.48
Liberal hold		Swing	−2.48	

==== 2013 ====
2013 Australian federal election: Hughes
Party	Candidate	Votes	%	±%
Liberal	Craig Kelly	48,436	54.68	+5.53
Labor	Alison Megarrity	28,406	32.07	−5.71
Palmer United	John Peters	5,224	5.90	+5.90
Greens	Signe Westerberg	3,948	4.46	−1.83
Christian Democrats	Peter Colsell	2,561	2.89	+0.44
Total formal votes		88,575	92.61	−0.87
Informal votes		7,071	7.39	+0.87
Turnout		95,646	94.24	+0.03
Two-party-preferred result
Liberal	Craig Kelly	53,735	60.67	+5.50
Labor	Alison Megarrity	34,840	39.33	−5.50
Liberal hold		Swing	+5.50	

==== 2010 ====
2010 Australian federal election: Hughes
Party	Candidate	Votes	%	±%
Liberal	Craig Kelly	42,424	49.15	+2.67
Labor	Brent Thomas	32,611	37.78	−5.96
Greens	Susan Roberts	5,430	6.29	+0.93
Christian Democrats	Scott Nailon	2,112	2.45	−0.70
One Nation	Peter Bussa	1,599	1.85	+1.85
Family First	Stan Hurley	1,183	1.37	+0.45
Liberal Democrats	Don Nguyen	948	1.10	+1.01
Total formal votes		86,307	93.48	−2.08
Informal votes		6,020	6.52	+2.08
Turnout		92,327	94.22	−1.83
Two-party-preferred result
Liberal	Craig Kelly	47,619	55.17	+4.63
Labor	Brent Thomas	38,688	44.83	−4.63
Liberal hold		Swing	+4.63	

=== Elections in the 2000s ===
==== 2007 ====
2007 Australian federal election: Hughes
Party	Candidate	Votes	%	±%
Liberal	Danna Vale	40,334	48.29	−4.73
Labor	Greg Holland	35,087	42.01	+8.26
Greens	Jamie Paterson	4,646	5.56	−1.20
Christian Democrats	John Vanderjagt	2,419	2.90	−0.07
Family First	Julie Mezyed	1,033	1.24	+1.24
Total formal votes		83,519	95.74	+1.26
Informal votes		3,712	4.26	−1.26
Turnout		87,231	95.67	+0.55
Two-party-preferred result
Liberal	Danna Vale	43,562	52.16	−6.39
Labor	Greg Holland	39,957	47.84	+6.39
Liberal hold		Swing	−6.39	

==== 2004 ====
2004 Australian federal election: Hughes
Party	Candidate	Votes	%	±%
Liberal	Danna Vale	43,726	55.28	+1.67
Labor	Greg Holland	24,739	31.28	+0.04
Greens	Lorraine Dixon	5,372	6.79	+2.23
Christian Democrats	John Vanderjagt	2,589	3.27	+1.15
Veterans	Bob Davis	1,504	1.90	+1.90
Democrats	Rob Bunt	1,162	1.47	−2.08
Total formal votes		79,091	94.93	−0.99
Informal votes		4,220	5.07	+0.99
Turnout		83,312	95.45	−0.69
Two-party-preferred result
Liberal	Danna Vale	48,279	61.04	+0.63
Labor	Greg Holland	30,813	38.96	−0.63
Liberal hold		Swing	+0.63	

==== 2001 ====
2001 Australian federal election: Hughes
Party	Candidate	Votes	%	±%
Liberal	Danna Vale	42,393	53.61	+5.86
Labor	Christine Hawkins	24,706	31.24	−2.12
One Nation	Susan Oz	3,885	4.91	−3.64
Greens	Simon Heemstra	3,604	4.56	+1.92
Democrats	Bruce van de Weg	2,811	3.55	−0.21
Christian Democrats	William Ryan	1,676	2.12	+2.10
Total formal votes		79,075	95.95	−0.26
Informal votes		3,341	4.05	+0.26
Turnout		82,416	96.51	
Two-party-preferred result
Liberal	Danna Vale	47,773	60.41	+4.05
Labor	Christine Hawkins	31,302	39.59	−4.05
Liberal hold		Swing	+4.05	

=== Elections in the 1990s ===
==== 1998 ====
1998 Australian federal election: Hughes
Party	Candidate	Votes	%	±%
Liberal	Danna Vale	38,199	46.97	−2.01
Labor	David Hill	27,711	34.07	−3.98
One Nation	Reginald Lowder	7,020	8.63	+8.63
Democrats	Adrian Blackburn	3,096	3.81	−2.00
Greens	Jo-Anne Lentern	2,224	2.73	−0.49
Independent	Jim McGoldrick	2,069	2.54	+2.54
Unity	Suthep Kunathai	655	0.81	+0.81
Abolish Child Support	Jim Bowen	211	0.26	+0.26
Republican	Martin Heald	148	0.18	+0.18
Total formal votes		81,333	96.26	−1.01
Informal votes		3,162	3.74	+1.01
Turnout		84,495	96.21	−1.26
Two-party-preferred result
Liberal	Danna Vale	45,154	55.52	+0.63
Labor	David Hill	36,179	44.48	−0.63
Liberal hold		Swing	+0.63	

==== 1996 ====
1996 Australian federal election: Hughes
Party	Candidate	Votes	%	±%
Liberal	Danna Vale	38,211	48.98	+10.74
Labor	Robert Tickner	29,690	38.05	−13.79
Democrats	Robert Koppelhuber	4,534	5.81	+1.86
Greens	Steve Allen	2,517	3.23	+3.23
Call to Australia	Christopher Derrick	1,571	2.01	−0.37
Independent	Martha Halliday	1,498	1.92	+1.92
Total formal votes		78,021	97.27	−0.12
Informal votes		2,192	2.73	+0.12
Turnout		80,213	97.47	+0.29
Two-party-preferred result
Liberal	Danna Vale	42,669	54.89	+11.31
Labor	Robert Tickner	35,072	45.11	−11.31
Liberal gain from Labor		Swing	+11.31	

==== 1993 ====
1993 Australian federal election: Hughes
Party	Candidate	Votes	%	±%
Labor	Robert Tickner	36,714	51.84	+7.05
Liberal	Noel Short	27,075	38.23	−0.13
Democrats	June Young	2,798	3.95	−8.20
Call to Australia	Colin Scott	1,689	2.38	+2.38
Independent	Sue Gunning	1,211	1.71	+1.71
Independent	Joanne Buckley	1,054	1.49	+1.49
Natural Law	Carol Maher	277	0.39	+0.39
Total formal votes		70,818	97.39	−0.38
Informal votes		1,899	2.61	+0.38
Turnout		72,717	97.18	
Two-party-preferred result
Labor	Robert Tickner	39,949	56.42	+0.37
Liberal	Noel Short	30,855	43.58	−0.37
Labor hold		Swing	+0.37	

==== 1990 ====
1990 Australian federal election: Hughes
Party	Candidate	Votes	%	±%
Labor	Robert Tickner	31,500	45.1	−4.7
Liberal	Cliff Mason	26,503	38.0	−3.6
Democrats	John Clancy	8,576	12.3	+3.8
|Illawarra Greens	George Kriflik	3,254	4.7	+4.7
Total formal votes		69,833	97.9	
Informal votes		1,491	2.1	
Turnout		71,324	96.3	
Two-party-preferred result
Labor	Robert Tickner	39,434	56.6	+1.5
Liberal	Cliff Mason	30,287	43.4	−1.5
Labor hold		Swing	+1.5	

=== Elections in the 1980s ===
==== 1987 ====
1987 Australian federal election: Hughes
Party	Candidate	Votes	%	±%
Labor	Robert Tickner	31,636	49.8	−2.7
Liberal	Cliff Mason	26,433	41.6	+2.0
Democrats	Paul Terrett	5,416	8.5	+1.5
Total formal votes		63,485	95.9	
Informal votes		2,696	4.1	
Turnout		66,181	95.2	
Two-party-preferred result
Labor	Robert Tickner	34,958	55.1	−1.4
Liberal	Cliff Mason	28,524	44.9	+1.4
Labor hold		Swing	−1.4	

==== 1984 ====
1984 Australian federal election: Hughes
Party	Candidate	Votes	%	±%
Labor	Robert Tickner	30,224	52.5	−1.9
Liberal	Cliff Mason	22,790	39.6	+4.0
Democrats	Harold Jeffrey	4,058	7.0	−2.1
Independent	Marjorie Wisby	497	0.9	+0.9
Total formal votes		57,569	95.2	
Informal votes		2,890	4.8	
Turnout		60,459	96.1	
Two-party-preferred result
Labor	Robert Tickner	32,517	56.5	−4.6
Liberal	Cliff Mason	25,052	43.5	+4.6
Labor hold		Swing	−4.6	

==== 1984 by-election ====
1984 Hughes by-election
Party	Candidate	Votes	%	±%
Labor	Robert Tickner	40,728	58.1	−3.5
Liberal	Clifford Mason	22,962	32.7	+4.3
Democrats	Ronald Hellyer	4,065	5.8	−3.3
Independent	Leslie Johnson	1,393	2.0	+2.0
National Action	Jim Saleam	970	1.4	+1.4
Total formal votes		70,118	97.9	
Informal votes		1,486	2.1	
Turnout		71,604	86.2	
Two-party-preferred result
Labor	Robert Tickner	44,162	63.0	−5.3
Liberal	Clifford Mason	25,956	37.0	+5.3
Labor hold		Swing	−5.3	

==== 1983 ====
1983 Australian federal election: Hughes
Party	Candidate	Votes	%	±%
Labor	Les Johnson	46,667	61.6	+4.6
Liberal	Peter Somerville	21,467	28.4	−5.3
Democrats	Ronald Hellyer	6,899	9.1	+0.8
Socialist Workers	Stephen Painter	672	0.9	+0.9
Total formal votes		75,705	98.2	
Informal votes		1,363	1.8	
Turnout		77,068	96.1	
Two-party-preferred result
Labor	Les Johnson		68.3	+6.2
Liberal	Peter Somerville		31.7	−6.2
Labor hold		Swing	+6.2	

==== 1980 ====
1980 Australian federal election: Hughes
Party	Candidate	Votes	%	±%
Labor	Les Johnson	40,470	57.0	+5.3
Liberal	Chris Downy	23,951	33.7	+0.6
Democrats	Questa Gill	5,867	8.3	−6.9
Progress	Marjorie Wisby	687	1.0	+1.0
Total formal votes		70,975	97.9	
Informal votes		1,517	2.1	
Turnout		72,492	95.8	
Two-party-preferred result
Labor	Les Johnson		62.1	+2.8
Liberal	Chris Downy		37.9	−2.8
Labor hold		Swing	+2.8	

=== Elections in the 1970s ===
==== 1977 ====
1977 Australian federal election: Hughes
Party	Candidate	Votes	%	±%
Labor	Les Johnson	34,659	51.7	−4.9
Liberal	Henry Halliwell	22,229	33.1	−10.3
Democrats	Kenneth Johnson	10,212	15.2	−4.9
Total formal votes		67,100	97.9	
Informal votes		1,410	2.1	
Turnout		68,510	95.5	
Two-party-preferred result
Labor	Les Johnson		59.3	+2.7
Liberal	Henry Halliwell		40.7	−2.7
Labor hold		Swing	+2.7	

==== 1975 ====
1975 Australian federal election: Hughes
Party	Candidate	Votes	%	±%
Labor	Les Johnson	37,000	59.3	−7.0
Liberal	Robert Law	25,362	40.7	+9.3
Total formal votes		62,362	98.0	
Informal votes		1,302	2.0	
Turnout		63,664	96.7	
Labor hold		Swing	−8.4	

==== 1974 ====
1974 Australian federal election: Hughes
Party	Candidate	Votes	%	±%
Labor	Les Johnson	40,005	66.3	−0.2
Liberal	Philip Benwell	18,954	31.4	+1.0
Australia	Walter Skarschewski	1,382	2.3	+2.3
Total formal votes		60,341	98.5	
Informal votes		894	1.5	
Turnout		61,235	95.1	
Two-party-preferred result
Labor	Les Johnson		67.7	+0.6
Liberal	Philip Benwell		32.3	−0.6
Labor hold		Swing	+0.6	

==== 1972 ====
1972 Australian federal election: Hughes
Party	Candidate	Votes	%	±%
Labor	Les Johnson	35,849	66.5	+5.2
Liberal	Eric Blain	16,399	30.4	+1.4
Democratic Labor	William Goslett	1,643	3.0	−0.2
Total formal votes		53,891	98.7	
Informal votes		719	1.3	
Turnout		54,610	96.4	
Two-party-preferred result
Labor	Les Johnson		67.1	+1.1
Liberal	Eric Blain		32.9	−1.1
Labor hold		Swing	+1.1	

=== Elections in the 1960s ===
==== 1969 ====
1969 Australian federal election: Hughes
Party	Candidate	Votes	%	±%
Labor	Les Johnson	30,004	61.3	+4.1
Liberal	Carl Leddy	14,162	29.0	−11.2
Independent	Marjorie Williams	3,169	6.5	+6.5
Democratic Labor	William Goslett	1,577	3.2	+0.6
Total formal votes		48,912	98.2	
Informal votes		920	1.8	
Turnout		49,832	96.0	
Two-party-preferred result
Labor	Les Johnson		66.0	+8.3
Liberal	Carl Leddy		34.0	−8.3
Labor notional hold		Swing	+8.3	

==== 1966 ====
1966 Australian federal election: Hughes
Party	Candidate	Votes	%	±%
Liberal	Don Dobie	37,647	49.9	+5.1
Labor	Les Johnson	35,793	47.5	−4.6
Democratic Labor	William Goslett	1,989	2.6	+0.2
Total formal votes		75,429	98.1	
Informal votes		1,463	1.9	
Turnout		76,892	95.8	
Two-party-preferred result
Liberal	Don Dobie	39,188	52.0	+4.7
Labor	Les Johnson	36,241	48.0	−4.7
Liberal gain from Labor		Swing	+4.7	

==== 1963 ====
1963 Australian federal election: Hughes
Party	Candidate	Votes	%	±%
Labor	Les Johnson	35,726	52.1	−7.1
Liberal	William Cover	30,751	44.8	+9.1
Democratic Labor	George Apap	1,665	2.4	−2.7
New Guinea	John Phillips	269	0.4	+0.4
Independent	John Mantova	200	0.3	+0.3
Total formal votes		68,611	98.4	
Informal votes		1,148	1.6	
Turnout		69,759	96.3	
Two-party-preferred result
Labor	Les Johnson		52.7	−8.3
Liberal	William Cover		47.3	+8.3
Labor hold		Swing	−8.3	

==== 1961 ====
1961 Australian federal election: Hughes
Party	Candidate	Votes	%	±%
Labor	Les Johnson	37,113	59.2	+5.4
Liberal	Keith Woodward	22,399	35.7	−6.3
Democratic Labor	Wesley Johns	3,226	5.1	+0.9
Total formal votes		62,738	97.9	
Informal votes		1,324	2.1	
Turnout		64,062	96.3	
Two-party-preferred result
Labor	Les Johnson		61.0	+6.4
Liberal	Keith Woodward		39.0	−6.4
Labor hold		Swing	+6.4	

=== Elections in the 1950s ===
==== 1958 ====
1958 Australian federal election: Hughes
Party	Candidate	Votes	%	±%
Labor	Les Johnson	28,651	53.8	+5.4
Liberal	John Dwyer	22,352	42.0	−4.7
Democratic Labor	Kevin O'Connor	2,221	4.2	+4.2
Total formal votes		53,224	97.8	
Informal votes		1,203	2.2	
Turnout		54,427	96.4	
Two-party-preferred result
Labor	Les Johnson		54.6	+2.4
Liberal	John Dwyer		45.4	−2.4
Labor hold		Swing	+2.4	

==== 1955 ====
1955 Australian federal election: Hughes
Party	Candidate	Votes	%	±%
Labor	Les Johnson	20,549	48.4	−7.0
Liberal	Keith Bates	19,840	46.7	+6.3
Communist	Alf Watt	1,201	2.8	+2.8
Independent	Robert Mackie	880	2.1	+2.1
Total formal votes		42,470	96.7	
Informal votes		1,437	3.3	
Turnout		43,907	95.7	
Two-party-preferred result
Labor	Les Johnson	22,165	52.2	−5.2
Liberal	Keith Bates	20,305	47.8	+5.2
Labor notional hold		Swing	−5.2	
