= Members of the Australian House of Representatives, 1983–1984 =

This is a list of members of the Australian House of Representatives from 1983 to 1984, as elected at the 1983 federal election. They were together known as the 33rd Parliament.

Member	Party	Electorate	State	In office
Evan Adermann	National	Fisher	Qld	1972–1990
Ken Aldred ^{[2]}	Liberal	Bruce	Vic	1975–1980, 1983–1996
Neil Andrew	Liberal	Wakefield	SA	1983–2004
Doug Anthony ^{[6]}	National	Richmond	NSW	1957–1984
Peter Baldwin	Labor	Sydney	NSW	1983–1998
Kim Beazley	Labor	Swan	WA	1980–2007
David Beddall	Labor	Fadden	Qld	1983–1998
Gordon Bilney	Labor	Kingston	SA	1983–1996
Allen Blanchard	Labor	Moore	WA	1983–1990
Neal Blewett	Labor	Bonython	SA	1977–1994
Charles Blunt ^{[6]}	National	Richmond	NSW	1984–1990
Lionel Bowen	Labor	Kingsford Smith	NSW	1969–1990
Ray Braithwaite	National	Dawson	Qld	1975–1996
Bob Brown	Labor	Hunter	NSW	1980–1998
John Brown	Labor	Parramatta	NSW	1977–1990
John Brumby	Labor	Bendigo	Vic	1983–1990
Max Burr	Liberal	Wilmot	Tas	1975–1993
Alan Cadman	Liberal	Mitchell	NSW	1974–2007
Ewen Cameron	Liberal	Indi	Vic	1977–1993
Don Cameron ^{[3]}	Liberal	Moreton	Qld	1966–1983, 1983–1990
Ian Cameron	National	Maranoa	Qld	1980–1990
Graeme Campbell	Labor	Kalgoorlie	WA	1980–1998
Jim Carlton	Liberal	Mackellar	NSW	1977–1994
David Charles	Labor	Isaacs	Vic	1980–1990
Ric Charlesworth	Labor	Perth	WA	1983–1993
Joan Child	Labor	Henty	Vic	1974–1975, 1980–1990
Bob Chynoweth	Labor	Flinders	Vic	1983–1990, 1993–1996
Barry Cohen	Labor	Robertson	NSW	1969–1990
Peter Coleman	Liberal	Wentworth	NSW	1981–1987
David Connolly	Liberal	Bradfield	NSW	1974–1996
Bruce Cowan	National	Lyne	NSW	1980–1993
Manfred Cross	Labor	Brisbane	Qld	1961–1975, 1980–1990
Barry Cunningham	Labor	McMillan	Vic	1980–1990, 1993–1996
Elaine Darling	Labor	Lilley	Qld	1980–1993
John Dawkins	Labor	Fremantle	WA	1974–1975, 1977–1994
Don Dobie	Liberal	Cook	NSW	1966–1972, 1975–1996
Peter Drummond	Liberal	Forrest	WA	1972–1987
Michael Duffy	Labor	Holt	Vic	1980–1996
Harry Edwards	Liberal	Berowra	NSW	1972–1993
Ron Edwards	Labor	Stirling	WA	1983–1993
Doug Everingham	Labor	Capricornia	Qld	1967–1975, 1977–1984
Wendy Fatin	Labor	Canning	WA	1983–1996
Wal Fife	Liberal	Farrer	NSW	1975–1993
Peter Fisher	National	Mallee	Vic	1972–1993
Malcolm Fraser ^{[1]}	Liberal	Wannon	Vic	1955–1983
Ross Free	Labor	Macquarie	NSW	1980–1996
Ken Fry	Labor	Fraser	ACT	1980–1984
John Gayler	Labor	Leichhardt	Qld	1983–1993
George Gear	Labor	Tangney	WA	1983–1996
Bruce Goodluck	Liberal	Franklin	Tas	1975–1993
Russ Gorman	Labor	Chifley	NSW	1983–1996
Alan Griffiths	Labor	Maribyrnong	Vic	1983–1996
Ray Groom	Liberal	Braddon	Tas	1975–1984
Steele Hall	Liberal	Boothby	SA	1981–1996
Gerry Hand	Labor	Melbourne	Vic	1983–1993
Bob Hawke	Labor	Wills	Vic	1980–1992
David Hawker ^{[1]}	Liberal	Wannon	Vic	1983–2010
Bill Hayden	Labor	Oxley	Qld	1961–1988
Noel Hicks	National	Riverina	NSW	1980–1998
Michael Hodgman	Liberal	Denison	Tas	1975–1987
Clyde Holding	Labor	Melbourne Ports	Vic	1977–1998
Colin Hollis	Labor	Macarthur	NSW	1983–2001
John Howard	Liberal	Bennelong	NSW	1974–2007
Brian Howe	Labor	Batman	Vic	1977–1996
Ben Humphreys	Labor	Griffith	Qld	1977–1996
Ralph Hunt	National	Gwydir	NSW	1969–1990
Chris Hurford	Labor	Adelaide	SA	1969–1987
Ralph Jacobi	Labor	Hawker	SA	1969–1987
Harry Jenkins Sr.	Labor	Scullin	Vic	1969–1986
Les Johnson ^{[4]}	Labor	Hughes	NSW	1955–1966, 1969–1984
Barry Jones	Labor	Lalor	Vic	1977–1998
Bob Katter Sr.	National	Kennedy	Qld	1966–1990
Paul Keating	Labor	Blaxland	NSW	1969–1996
Ros Kelly	Labor	Canberra	ACT	1980–1995
Lewis Kent	Labor	Hotham	Vic	1980–1990
Len Keogh	Labor	Bowman	Qld	1969–1975, 1983–1987
John Kerin	Labor	Werriwa	NSW	1972–1975, 1978–1993
Sir James Killen ^{[3]}	Liberal	Moreton	Qld	1955–1983
Dick Klugman	Labor	Prospect	NSW	1969–1990
Ted Lindsay	Labor	Herbert	Qld	1983–1996
Bruce Lloyd	National	Murray	Vic	1971–1996
Stephen Lusher	National	Hume	NSW	1974–1984
Stewart McArthur ^{[5]}	Liberal	Corangamite	Vic	1984–2007
Peter McGauran	National	Gippsland	Vic	1983–2008
Jeannette McHugh	Labor	Phillip	NSW	1983–1996
Michael MacKellar	Liberal	Warringah	NSW	1969–1994
Leo McLeay	Labor	Grayndler	NSW	1979–2004
Ian Macphee	Liberal	Balaclava	Vic	1974–1990
Tom McVeigh	National	Darling Downs	Qld	1972–1988
Michael Maher	Labor	Lowe	NSW	1969–1987
Helen Mayer	Labor	Chisholm	Vic	1983–1987
John Mildren	Labor	Ballarat	Vic	1980–1990
Clarrie Millar	National	Wide Bay	Qld	1974–1990
Peter Milton	Labor	La Trobe	Vic	1980–1990
John Moore	Liberal	Ryan	Qld	1975–2001
Allan Morris	Labor	Newcastle	NSW	1983–2001
Peter Morris	Labor	Shortland	NSW	1972–1998
Bill Morrison	Labor	St George	NSW	1969–1975, 1980–1984
John Mountford	Labor	Banks	NSW	1980–1990
Kevin Newman	Liberal	Bass	Tas	1975–1984
Frank O'Keefe	National	Paterson	NSW	1969–1984
Lloyd O'Neil	Labor	Grey	SA	1983–1993
Andrew Peacock	Liberal	Kooyong	Vic	1966–1994
James Porter	Liberal	Barker	SA	1975–1990
Gary Punch	Labor	Barton	NSW	1983–1996
John Reeves	Labor	Northern Territory	NT	1983–1984
Ian Robinson	National	Cowper	NSW	1963–1990
Allan Rocher	Liberal	Curtin	WA	1981–1998
Philip Ruddock	Liberal	Dundas	NSW	1973–2016
John Saunderson	Labor	Deakin	Vic	1983–1990
Gordon Scholes	Labor	Corio	Vic	1967–1993
John Scott	Labor	Hindmarsh	SA	1980–1993
Roger Shipton	Liberal	Higgins	Vic	1975–1990
David Simmons	Labor	Calare	NSW	1983–1996
Ian Sinclair	National	New England	NSW	1963–1998
Sir Billy Snedden ^{[2]}	Liberal	Bruce	Vic	1955–1983
Jim Snow	Labor	Eden-Monaro	NSW	1983–1996
John Spender	Liberal	North Sydney	NSW	1980–1990
Peter Staples	Labor	Diamond Valley	Vic	1983–1996
Peter Steedman	Labor	Casey	Vic	1983–1984
Tony Street ^{[5]}	Liberal	Corangamite	Vic	1966–1984
Andrew Theophanous	Labor	Burke	Vic	1980–2001
Robert Tickner ^{[4]}	Labor	Hughes	NSW	1984–1996
Wilson Tuckey	Liberal	O'Connor	WA	1980–2010
Tom Uren	Labor	Reid	NSW	1958–1990
Dean Wells	Labor	Petrie	Qld	1983–1984
Stewart West	Labor	Cunningham	NSW	1977–1993
Peter White	Liberal	McPherson	Qld	1981–1990
Ralph Willis	Labor	Gellibrand	Vic	1972–1998
Ian Wilson	Liberal	Sturt	SA	1966–1969, 1972–1993
Mick Young	Labor	Port Adelaide	SA	1974–1988

^{1} The Liberal member for Wannon (VIC), Malcolm Fraser, resigned on 31 March 1983; Liberal candidate David Hawker won the resulting by-election on 7 May 1983.
^{2} The Liberal member for Bruce (VIC), Sir Billy Snedden, resigned on 21 April 1983; Liberal candidate Ken Aldred won the resulting by-election on 28 May 1983.
^{3} The Liberal member for Moreton (Qld), Sir James Killen, resigned on 15 August 1983; Liberal candidate Don Cameron won the resulting by-election on 5 November 1983.
^{4} The Labor member for Hughes (NSW), Les Johnson, resigned in January 1984; Labor candidate Robert Tickner won the resulting by-election on 18 February 1984.
^{5} The Liberal member for Corangamite, Tony Street, resigned on 18 January 1984; Liberal candidate Stewart McArthur won the resulting by-election on 18 February 1984.
^{6} The National member for Richmond (NSW), Doug Anthony, resigned on 18 January 1984; National candidate Charles Blunt won the resulting by-election on 18 February 1984.
