= Jenny Ware =

Australian politician

Jenny Ware MP
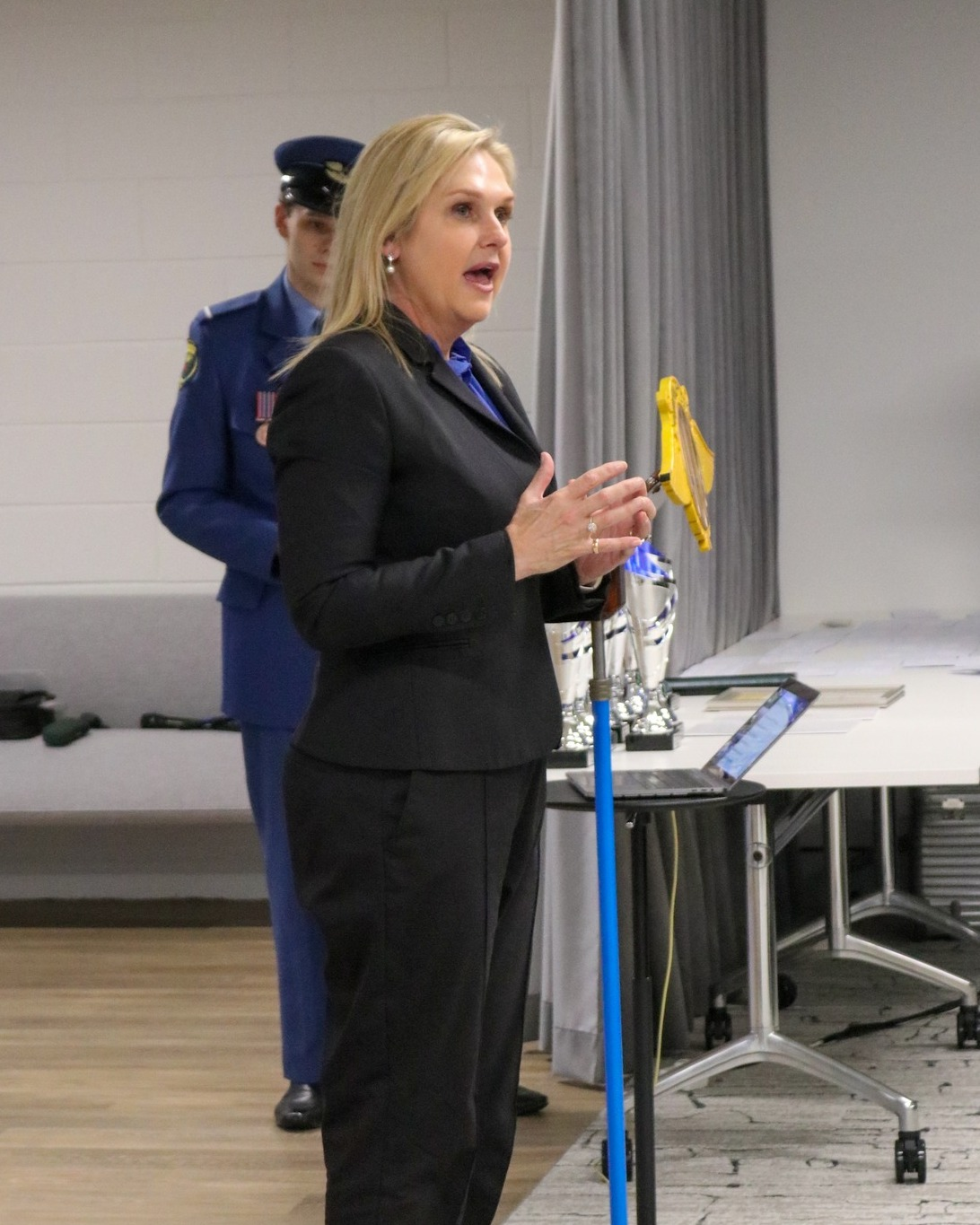
- Ware in 2023

Member of the Australian Parliament for Hughes
- In office 21 May 2022 – 3 May 2025
- Preceded by: Craig Kelly
- Succeeded by: David Moncrieff

Personal details
- Born: 21 October 1970 (age 56) Darlinghurst, New South Wales, Australia
- Party: Liberal
- Occupation: Solicitor

Jennifer Leslie Ware (born 21 October 1970) is an Australian politician and a member of the Liberal Party. She was elected to the House of Representatives in 2022, representing the Division of Hughes in New South Wales, until losing the seat at the 2025 Australian federal election.

== Early life ==
Ware grew up in Cronulla, New South Wales, and attended South Cronulla Primary School and St George Girls High School, which her mother and grandmother had previously attended. She has one sister.

== Legal career ==
In her legal practice, Ware's focus was planning and environmental law, moving from private law firms to the government sector in 2013, when Ware became legal counsel for Hurstville City Council and later, Georges River Council.

== Political career ==
Ware joined the Liberal Party in 2002 and was a long time member before leaving the party and rejoining in 2021. After the local preselection ballot was cancelled with some controversy, Ware was selected "by a committee comprising Prime Minister Scott Morrison, Premier Dominic Perrottet and former federal Liberal Party president Chris McDiven" and announced on 2 April 2022 as the Liberal candidate for the 2022 Australian federal election. She was backed by the moderate faction, of which she is a member. Liberal Party members who endorsed her included the former Member for Hughes, Danna Vale, Member for Cronulla Mark Speakman and Member for Heathcote, Lee Evans. Ware was inspired to run by Danna Vale's record of advocacy for the people of Hughes, and Ware furthermore described the people of Hughes as Menzies' "Forgotten People". Ware was elected to the House of Representatives in the 2022 election, gaining the New South Wales seat of Hughes from incumbent Craig Kelly of the UAP (former Liberal party member) with a swing of –9.3% against the Liberal party on first preferences and –2.79% on the two-candidate preferred count.

Ware was a member of the House of Representatives Standing Committees on Social Policy and Legal Affairs; and, on Health, Aged Care and Sport, from 1 August 2022 to 28 March 2025. She was also a member of the Joint Standing Committee on the National Disability Insurance Scheme served from 1 August 2022 to 20 March 2024 and a Member of the House of Representatives Standing Committee on Climate Change, Energy, Environment and Water served from 20 March 2024 to 28 March 2025.

=== Political views ===
Ware wrote to the Sydney Morning Herald in 2001, praising Pauline Hanson for being in touch with what was "causing Australians the most angst: the BAS (business activity statement), illegal boat people, road funding, competition policy, health, and education", furthermore describing John Howard and Kim Beazley as "out of touch". When approached about these comments in the lead up to the 2022 election, Ware said that they reflected her frustrations at the time, noting that she had joined the Liberal Party and had been advocating for the important issues since.

During the 2022 election campaign, Ware stated that she had played softball with and against transgender women, and disagreed with Katherine Deves' statements about transgender women.

Ware supports the use of nuclear power in Australia.

During her term, Ware participated in the Parliamentary Friends of Dementia, the Parliamentary Friends of Israel, the Parliamentary Friends of Nuclear Industries, the Parliamentary Friends of Organ Donation and the Parliamentary Friends of Suicide Prevention.

Ware hosted a forum on the Voice to Parliament which did not include Indigenous speakers. Phil Dotti, the first Aboriginal player for the Cronulla Sharks, attended the forum, and after listening to the speakers and not being called on to ask a question, he walked to the stage and spoke. The livestream of the event was cut at this point.

Ware was a member of the House of Representatives Standing Committee on Social Policy and Legal Affairs during its inquiry into online gambling and its impacts on those experiencing gambling harm. Ware has stated that "most Australians gamble responsibly".

After losing the seat of Hughes in 2025, Ware nominated for Liberal Party preselection for Miranda against incumbent Eleni Petinos at the 2027 New South Wales state election.

== Post political career ==
Ware is on the board of Crohn's Collitis Australia.

== Personal life ==
Ware lives in Gymea Bay with her husband and two sons, and has done volunteer work with the Sylvanvale Foundation (a disability support organisation) and as President of the Gymea Bay P&C. Ware's husband, Mike, is a sales rep. The couple married in 1999. As of 2021, Ware was the part-owner of three properties.

Parliament of Australia
Preceded by Craig Kelly	Member for Hughes; 2022–2025	Succeeded by David Moncrieff
