= Charles Blunt =

Australian politician (born 1951)

Leader of the National Party
- In office 9 May 1989 – 6 April 1990
- Deputy: Bruce Lloyd
- Preceded by: Ian Sinclair
- Succeeded by: Tim Fischer

Member of the Australian Parliament for Richmond
- In office 18 February 1984 – 24 March 1990
- Preceded by: Doug Anthony
- Succeeded by: Neville Newell

Personal details
- Born: 19 January 1951 (age 75) Sydney, New South Wales
- Party: National Party of Australia
- Education: University of Sydney
- Occupation: Economist

Charles William Blunt (born 19 January 1951) is a former Australian politician who served as leader of the National Party of Australia from 1989 to 1990.

== Early life ==
Blunt was born in Sydney and graduated from the University of Sydney with a degree in economics. After working in various positions he was hired as New South Wales State Director of the National Party.

== Politics ==
At a by-election on 18 February 1984, Blunt was elected to the House of Representatives for the Division of Richmond in northern New South Wales, despite having had no previous connections with the area. He succeeded the former Deputy Prime Minister and leader of the NPA, Doug Anthony, who had resigned his seat.

Blunt was immediately promoted to the opposition front bench, serving as shadow Minister for Social Services. He was returned to parliament at the 1984 and 1987 general elections.

== Leader of the National Party ==
In 1989 Blunt organised a leadership coup against the veteran leader of the NPA, Ian Sinclair. He aimed to modernise the NPA and bring it into closer alignment with the Liberal Party, particularly on issues of economic deregulation. He was also more socially liberal than most NPA members.

Unfortunately for Blunt, neither of these things was popular with rank and file NPA members, and he found his leadership under increasing attack from traditionalists. At the same time the seat of Richmond, which had been held by the NPA and its predecessor the Country Party since 1922, was becoming more urbanised. Some argue that the growing unpopularity of the National Party state government in Queensland influenced federal voting intentions. Richmond sits across the Tweed River from the Gold Coast, and the two areas share a television market. However, the seat had actually become more marginal in the latter part of Doug Anthony's tenure. The anti-war campaigner Helen Caldicott announced that she would oppose Blunt in his electorate at the next election.

The culmination of these trends was a swing against the NPA at the 1990 election, at which the Hawke Labor government was re-elected. Blunt was defeated in his own seat of Richmond. He went into the election holding Richmond with a majority of six percent, just barely outside the range of being safe. However, he had no local connections, which worked against him in a country seat. Labor challenger Neville Newell won the seat on the seventh count after Caldicott's preferences flowed overwhelmingly to him, allowing him to take the seat on a swing of seven percent. It was only the second time that the leader of a major Australian party had lost his own seat in an election; the first was Stanley Bruce, the then Prime Minister, who not only led his party to defeat in 1929 election but also lost his own seat of Flinders. The NPA also lost the adjoining seat of Page, both campaigns being heavily influenced by Queensland media.

After the election, Blunt was again the focus of political controversy when he was accused of inappropriately using publicly funded mailouts of election-related material:

Yesterday I was asked by the honourable member for Wannon a series of questions relating to postal allowances. I can confirm that Dr Hewson, as Opposition leader, spent $3,000 on postage. Mr Peacock spent $5,100. The former Democrats leader, Mrs Janine Haines, spent $5,500. I spent $10,255. And Mr Charles Blunt, the former National Party leader, spent $278,922."

— Bob Hawke, November 1990,

After an investigation Blunt was found not to have breached any rules, and the matter was dropped.

== Later life ==
After leaving politics Blunt went into business. He led a number of trade and investment missions to the United States and was a regular speaker at international trade and investment outlook conferences. In 1992 he became National Director of the American Chamber of Commerce in Australia, resigning in 2013. He is also currently chair of a number of publicly listed companies, including Capital Trade and Policy and Palamedia.

In 2014, Blunt appeared in a documentary about the Nationals, "A Country Road: The Nationals" in which he talked about his time as Nationals leader. On the same programme, John Sharp, a Nationals MP at the time of Blunt's leadership, said that in hindsight it was a mistake for Sinclair to be replaced as leader by Blunt.

Parliament of Australia
Preceded by Doug Anthony	Member for Richmond; 1984–1990	Succeeded by Neville Newell
Party political offices
Preceded by Ian Sinclair	Leader of the National Party of Australia; 1989–1990	Succeeded by Tim Fischer
