= 1984 Richmond by-election =

- 18 February 1984
	First party	Second party	Third party
Candidate	Charles Blunt	Peter Carmont	Brian Pezzutti
Party	National	Labor	Liberal
Popular vote	26,972	28,914	16,948
Percentage	33.8%	36.2%	21.2%
Swing	▼19.2	▼3.2	▲21.2
TPP	55.8%	44.2%
TPP swing	▼0.1	▲0.1
MP before election
Doug Anthony
National
Elected MP
Charles Blunt
National

A by-election was held for the Australian House of Representatives seat of Richmond on 18 February 1984. This was triggered by the resignation of National Party Leader MP Doug Anthony. The by-election was held to coincide with the Corangamite and Hughes by-elections.

The election was won by National candidate and future Nationals leader, Charles Blunt, despite challenges from both the Labor and Liberal parties.

== Candidates ==
- National Party of Australia – Charles Blunt, State Director of the National Party.
- Independent – Fast Bucks. He later stood for the Senate in Queensland in 1984 for the Conservative Party, and as an independent in 1987 in Wills.
- Australian Labor Party – Peter Carmont.
- Australian Democrats – Simon Clough.
- Independent – Denis Griffin.
- Liberal Party of Australia – Brian Pezzutti, former national serviceman and president of the Lismore branch of the Liberal Party. He was later elected to the New South Wales Legislative Council.
- Uninflated Movement – Nadar Ponnuswamy, Newtown restaurateur and candidate at the October 1983 Marrickville by-election.

== Results ==
Richmond by-election, 1984
Party	Candidate	Votes	%	±%
Labor	Peter Carmont	28,914	36.2	−3.5
National	Charles Blunt	26,972	33.8	−19.2
Liberal	Brian Pezzutti	16,948	21.2	+21.2
Independent	Fast Bucks	3,657	4.6	+4.6
Democrats	Simon Clough	2,587	3.2	−4.1
Independent	Denis Griffin	469	0.6	+0.6
Uninflated Movement	Nadar Ponnuswamy	290	0.4	+0.4
Total formal votes		79,837	98.3	
Informal votes		1,383	1.7	
Turnout		81,220	89.8	
Two-party-preferred result
National	Charles Blunt	44,528	55.8	−0.1
Labor	Peter Carmont	35,309	44.2	+0.1
National hold		Swing	−0.1	

== See also ==
- List of Australian federal by-elections
