= 1984 Corangamite by-election =

Australian federal by-election

- 18 February 1984

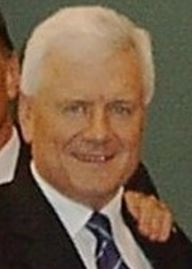

	First party	Second party	Third party
Candidate	Stewart McArthur	Gavan O'Connor	David Seymour
Party	Liberal	Labor	National
Popular vote	32,083	25,517	9,794
Percentage	46.7%	37.1%	14.2%
Swing	▼11.5	▼4.7	▲14.2
TPP	59.4%	40.6%
TPP swing	▲1.2	▼1.2
MP before election
Tony Street
Liberal
Elected MP
Stewart McArthur
Liberal

A by-election was held for the Australian House of Representatives seat of Corangamite on 18 February 1984. This was triggered by the resignation of Liberal Party MP Tony Street. The by-election was held to coincide with the Hughes and Richmond by-elections.

The election was comfortably won by Liberal candidate Stewart McArthur.

== Candidates ==
- Democratic Labor Party – Joseph Lam.
- Liberal Party of Australia – Stewart McArthur, a local farmer and company director.
- Australian Labor Party – Gavan O'Connor, a local farmer and teacher. O'Connor was later elected to federal Parliament as the member for Corio in 1993.
- National Party of Australia – David Seymour.

== Results ==
Corangamite by-election, 1984
Party	Candidate	Votes	%	±%
Liberal	Stewart McArthur	32,083	46.7	−11.5
Labor	Gavan O'Connor	25,517	37.1	−4.7
National	David Seymour	9,794	14.2	+14.2
Democratic Labor	Joseph Lam	1,336	1.9	+1.9
Total formal votes		68,730	98.4	
Informal votes		1,096	1.6	
Turnout		69,826	92.4	
Two-party-preferred result
Liberal	Stewart McArthur	40,837	59.4	+1.2
Labor	Gavan O'Connor	27,893	40.6	−1.2
Liberal hold		Swing	+1.2	

== See also ==
- List of Australian federal by-elections
