= Craig Kelly =

Australian politician (born 1963)

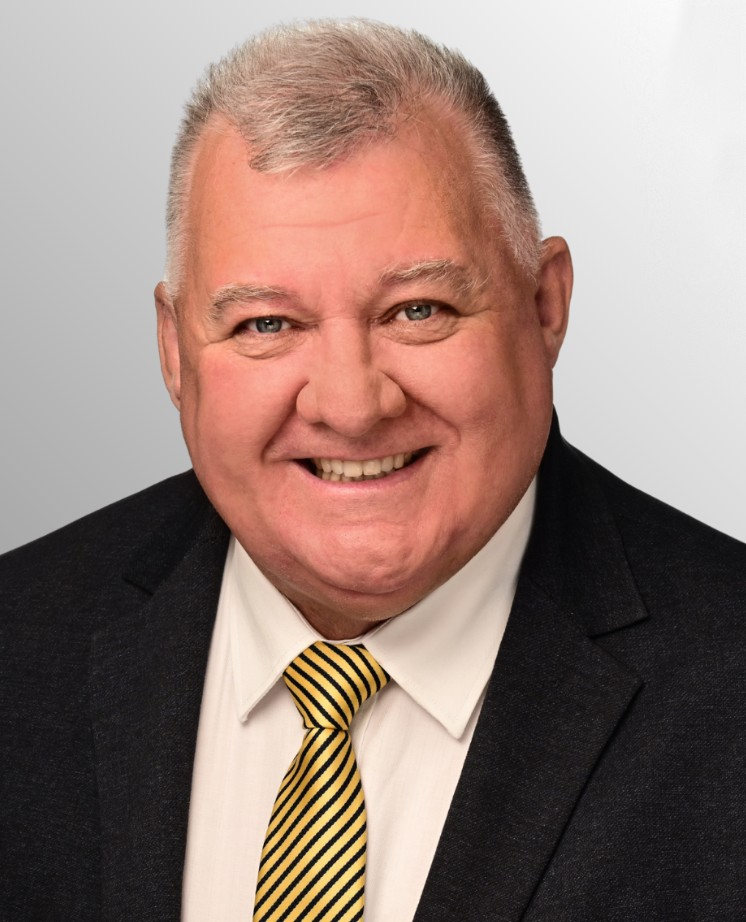
- Kelly in 2025

Leader of the United Australia Party
- In office 23 August 2021 – 27 February 2024
- Chairman: Clive Palmer
- Preceded by: Clive Palmer
- Succeeded by: Ralph Babet

Member of the Australian Parliament for Hughes
- In office 21 August 2010 – 21 May 2022
- Preceded by: Danna Vale
- Succeeded by: Jenny Ware

Personal details
- Born: Craig Kelly; 29 September 1963 (age 63) Sydney, New South Wales, Australia
- Party: Libertarian (since 2024)
- Other political affiliations: Independent (2021; 2024); One Nation (2024); United Australia (2021–2024); Liberal (2010–2021)
- Spouse: Vicki Kelly
- Children: 2
- Occupation: Businessman; politician
- Website: craigkelly.com.au

Craig Kelly (born 29 September 1963) is an Australian conservative politician who represented the division of Hughes as a Liberal Party (and later United Australia Party) MP from 2010 until his defeat at the 2022 federal election.

Kelly initially entered politics as a member of the Liberal Party, and was elected to the Australian House of Representatives at the 2010 federal election, as a member of parliament (MP) for the division of Hughes. He resigned from the Liberal Party in February 2021 to sit on the crossbench as an independent politician, before announcing that he was joining the United Australia Party in August of that year, and was appointed as the party's leader.

Kelly has been widely criticised for spreading misinformation on social media. He has given a platform to numerous conspiracy theories, and has propagated climate change denial and falsehoods regarding COVID-19. By January 2020, Kelly's Facebook page had higher levels of engagement than either the Prime Minister or the Opposition Leader, leading The Sydney Morning Herald to call Kelly "one of Australia's most influential politicians on Facebook". Kelly is also a frequent guest on Sky News Australia.

On 27 February 2024, Kelly left the UAP to join Pauline Hanson's One Nation as the party's federal campaign director. He left the party in September of the same year. Kelly contested the 2025 federal election as the Libertarian Party's lead candidate for the Senate in New South Wales.

== Early years and background ==
Kelly was born in Sydney on 29 September 1963. He is one of four children born to Lawrence and Raima Kelly. He was educated at public schools.

After finishing high school Kelly worked for his parents as a furniture salesman and "export manager" at their furniture business DV Kelly Pty Ltd. The firm imported Asian furniture and onsold it to retailers like Harvey Norman, but financial troubles resulted in the Australian Taxation Office issuing wind-up orders in 2012, leaving creditors and employees owed over $4 million. The administrator's report suggested that Kelly may have been a de facto director of the company and thus be liable to be pursued for trading while insolvent. He stated that this was a "completely baseless allegation", and had previously stated in his maiden speech to parliament that he stopped working for the company in 2009 in order to run for parliament. However, Crikey subsequently reported that Kelly had signed himself as a director of the company on a number of documents related to a court case in New Zealand. He was registered as a director of three related companies – Homewares Depot, Valentino Franchising and Valentino Home Fashion – until March 2011.

Kelly established the now-defunct Southern Sydney Retailers Association, which he used as a platform to lobby the Australian Competition & Consumer Commission.

== Political career ==
=== Member of the Liberal Party (2010-2021) ===
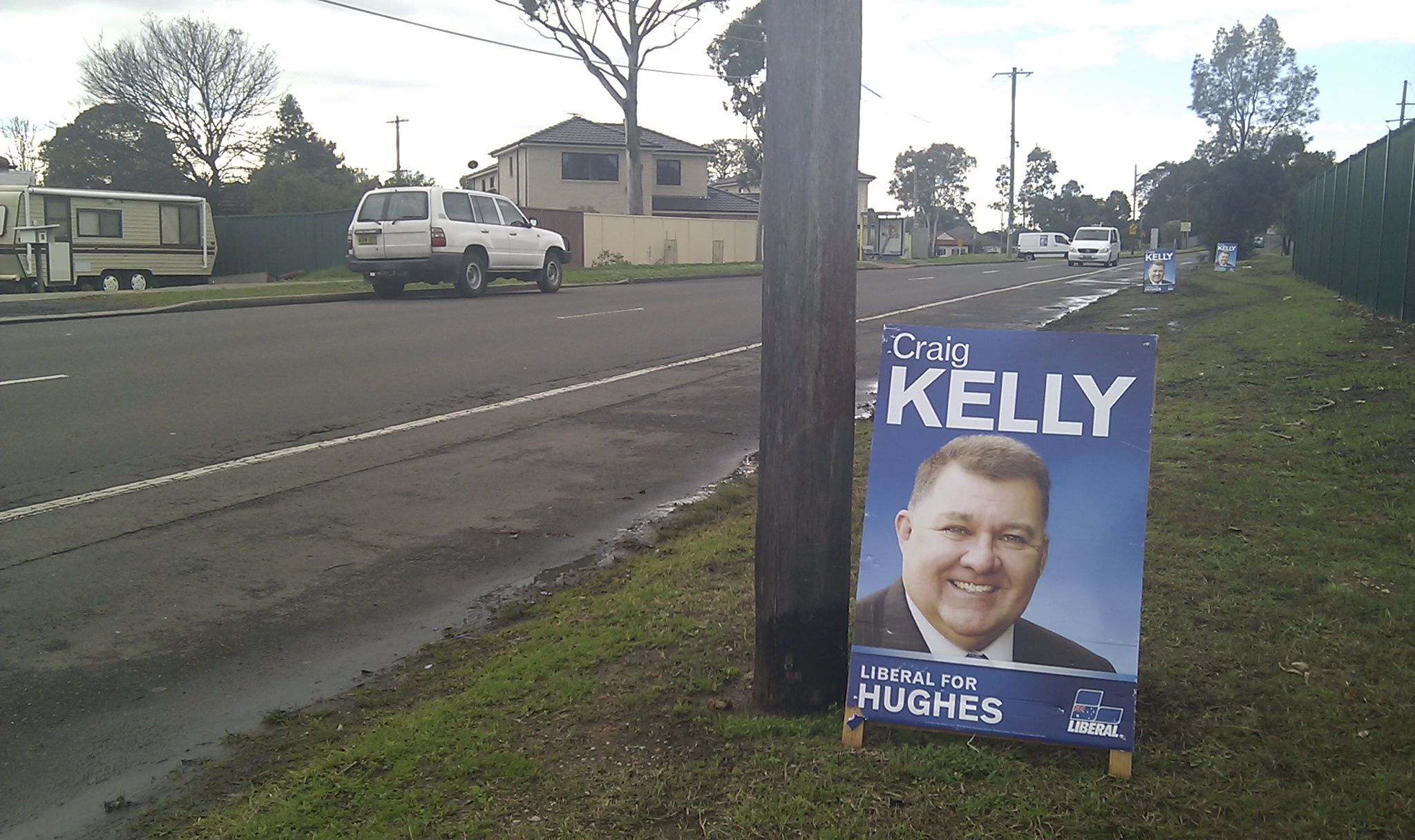
An East Hills placard for Kelly in the 2010 Australian federal election

At age 46, Kelly was elected to the Australian House of Representatives as the Member for Hughes in 2010, which was considered a marginal seat. He served on the Standing Appropriations and Administration Australian House of Representatives committee from 2010 to 2013. In 2012, Kelly was referred to the parliamentary privileges committee over a range of allegations, including a failure to declare on his register of interests his directorship of several companies linked to his family's bankrupt company, which owed millions to creditors and staff. The then Leader of the House, Anthony Albanese, alleged Kelly failed to disclose his directorship of three entities which he had not officially relinquished until March 2011, eight months after the 2010 election. Kelly denied the allegations and the Parliamentary Privileges Committee did not pursue the matter further.

Kelly and the President of the NSW Commandos Association, Barry Grant, fought Labor government cuts in the 2012 budget to entitlements for defence personnel to travel home during holiday times. Kelly and Grant put together a petition in favour of reinstating the entitlements that was circulated Australia-wide, attracting well over 10,000 signatures. With Kelly's help a disallowance motion was moved in the House of Representatives that forced the Labor government to reinstate the entitlements. This affected upwards of 22,000 service men and women.

In 2013, Kelly was nominated by then Opposition leader Tony Abbott as the representative of the Coalition on the bipartisan committee overseeing the implementation of the National Disability Insurance Scheme. Kelly was the only sitting member of the House of Representatives with firsthand knowledge of raising a child with severe disabilities and said that he would use this experience in the position. Kelly also served on the Joint Standing Committee on Migration from 2013 to 2016.

In April 2014, Kelly spoke at an event commemorating the establishment in 1941 of the Independent State of Croatia, which was associated with Fascist Italy and Nazi Germany during the Second World War. A Croatian-language newspaper described Kelly's speech as conveying congratulations from Prime Minister Tony Abbott. Kelly subsequently described the speech he gave as condemning fascism and communism, and apologised for appearing to endorse the flag of the Independent State of Croatia.

Kelly served on the Joint Standing Committee on Law Enforcement from 2015, and he became the committee's chair in that same year. Speaking in relation to his position as chairman of the Joint Committee on Law Enforcement, Kelly proposed that signs at Mildura should warn drivers of an increased risk of car theft in the town. In the Liberal Party of Australia leadership spill, September 2015, Kelly supported Tony Abbott as prime minister.

Kelly opposed the Moorebank Intermodal Terminal in 2015 and 2016, citing concerns about diesel air pollution. The project will enable "import-export freight travelling through Sydney to and from Port Botany to be transported on rail instead of the road network". The Intermodal Terminal began construction in 2017.

In the lead-up to the 2016 election, the moderate faction of the Liberal party planned to challenge Kelly in his seat. Radio commentator Alan Jones threw his support behind Kelly, and Prime Minister Turnbull wrote a letter of endorsement, stating that Kelly was one of the government's "most consistent performers" and that Kelly had a "fine reputation". Tony Abbott had also "pushed aside moderate challengers" to Kelly when Abbott was Prime Minister. The redistribution of Hughes was thought to strengthen Kelly's hold on the seat, and Kelly was returned with a margin greater than 9 points, despite a small swing against him.

Kelly travelled to Azerbaijan for a week to observe the 2016 referendum, listing the trip on his statement of members' interests. Kelly returned to Azerbaijan to observe the presidential election in 2018, praising the use of photographic ID to obtain a ballot paper.

Kelly was the chair of a parliamentary inquiry into methamphetamine, and has urged his colleagues to look at the drug policy of Portugal. Kelly opposes drug checking.

Kelly was expected to be challenged for preselection for his seat for the 2019 Australian federal election, and former prime minister Tony Abbott endorsed Kelly. Again being challenged by the moderate faction of the Liberal party, Kelly reportedly threatened to join the crossbench as an independent if he did not win preselection, but stated that he has confidence in the preselection committee.

On 18 July 2018, Kelly commented on Sky News, in response to a Facebook post by the father of three children killed aboard MH17: 'if some of the things that Russia has gotten away with in the past has to be slightly looked over, well I'm sorry that's the price that we have to pay sometimes to have good relations going forward'.

In the Liberal Party of Australia leadership spill, 2018 on 21 August, Kelly confirmed he voted for Peter Dutton to become leader of the Federal Parliamentary Liberal Party and therefore Prime Minister. In the second spill on 24 August, Kelly was one of the first few to sign the petition calling for a party room meeting to vote on the leadership of the Liberal Party. While he voted for Dutton in the second spill, Kelly stated that he would throw his support behind Scott Morrison. Kelly criticised Julia Banks' decision to retire following the spill in a Sky News interview, defending politics as a "rough-and-tumble game."

Kelly was critical of AGL's 2018 announcement that the coal-fired Liddell Power Station would be closed in 2022, stating that it was anti-competitive of AGL not to consider selling Liddell before retiring it. As of August 2018, Kelly's electoral conference had raised $5,000 of a $75,000 fundraising target for the Liberal Party. Kelly was approached to run for the electoral district of East Hills, a state seat, but declined. Scott Morrison reportedly intervened in the pre-selection process for Hughes, indicating that he wanted Kelly to run unchallenged, but local branch members argued that as Kelly was an important figure in the August leadership spills, he should go. The pre-selection contest was reportedly being delayed by the party as long as possible, and Kelly was advised by former Liberal Party presidential candidate John Ruddick to quit the party and run as an independent. Kelly affirmed that he intends to remain in the Liberal Party, although he refused to rule out a move to the crossbench if he lost pre-selection. Morrison reportedly floated using state executive powers to save Kelly from a pre-selection challenge, taking the decision-making process away from grassroots members. This has been described by former prime minister Malcolm Turnbull as unacceptable. Turnbull dismissed comparisons to his own 2016 intervention to save Kelly, and cited recent campaigns in NSW to allow grassroots members more say in pre-selection contests as the reason for his intervention. When the government moved to head off a dispute by using state executive powers to automatically endorse sitting members, Turnbull launched a failed intervention to prevent the outcome, hoping Kelly, a Dutton backer, would be ousted. When Turnbull's representations were leaked to the press, Turnbull confirmed them, and the intervention made it harder for the moderates to do anything other than tacitly re-endorse Kelly. Kelly stated that he was unaware of a job offer being made to his challenger, Kent Johns, on the condition that Johns drop out of the pre-selection race. During the 2019 election campaign, there was a grassroots campaign to unseat Kelly, "Hughes Deserves Better". They used dinosaur suits to draw attention to Kelly's views on climate change. Kelly was returned with a small swing towards him.

In October 2018, Kelly suggested that the fuel excise should be reduced by 10 cents per litre, and that divestiture powers should apply to the petrol industry.

Kelly is said to cherry-pick "rich meme content that is stimulating, share-able and attractive to his base voters" on social media. He achieves higher levels of engagement than either the Prime Minister or the Opposition Leader by selectively reinforcing the conservative opinions of his followers. A scientist has used Kelly's Facebook page to rebut Kelly's "blatant misrepresentation" of her study, with another scientist saying that Kelly had taken an anomaly out of context to make his point. Despite calling for free speech on the platform, Kelly blocks some commenters, including constituents, who politely disagree with him. A website was set up by a Hughes constituent to fact-check Kelly's claims. Kelly appeared on a podcast with former celebrity chef and conspiracy theorist, Pete Evans. In February 2020 Kelly stated that government taxes on tobacco are driving the creation of a black market. Kelly was criticised for appearing with Pete Evans by RACGP President Dr Karen Price. Kelly has also suggested that the Luxury Car Tax, which applies to imported vehicles worth more than $67,500, be abolished.

Kelly was set to face a preselection contest in Hughes, but in February 2021 he resigned from the Liberal Party and sat on the crossbench as an independent. He confirmed he would continue to support the Morrison Liberal/National government on confidence and supply.

Kelly has said he supports the call for a royal commission into suicides by veterans.

While usually up to four extra staff can be allocated to independent MPs, the current Prime Minister must approve any such staffing increase, and Kelly was not allocated extra staff.

Kelly amended the Your Future Your Super bill before it passed the lower house to delay the bill's start to July 2022 and to exempt high-risk occupations from 'stapling' people to their first superannuation fund.

=== Leader of the United Australia Party (2021-2024) ===
On 23 August 2021, Kelly joined and was appointed the leader of Clive Palmer's United Australia Party (UAP). Kelly was previously approached to join after becoming an independent. Kelly will continue to support the government on issues of confidence and supply. Kelly has drafted a bill calling for politicians and senior bureaucrats to be paid $750 per week while a lockdown is in place in their area. Kelly has been criticised for using random-number dialling technology to send unsolicited text messages. The Therapeutic Goods Administration (TGA) is seeking legal advice over whether a website linked in these texts which uses the TGA's logo and data breaches the criminal code. His personal mobile phone number was leaked by Australian online news publisher, Crikey, in retaliation. Hundreds of frustrated recipients of the unsolicited sms messages also joined together to send a huge bag of dildos to Craig Kelly to protest his divisive anti-vaccination text messages and inadequate regulation surrounding political parties exemption from the Spam Act.

In November 2021, Kelly was ‘awarded’ in absentia the ‘Bent Spoon’ award by organisation the Australian Skeptics ‘for spreading misinformation about Covid and vaccinations.’

Kelly charged taxpayers for flights and the use of Comcar (a government car service) to attend anti-vaccine mandate and anti-lockdown protests in Melbourne in November and December 2021, and was investigated by the Independent Parliamentary Expenses Authority as to whether it was an appropriate use of taxpayer funds. Kelly argued that it was related to parliamentary business due to his private members' bill on vaccine passports. Kelly was told to repay $2000 from these trips by the Independent Parliamentary Expenses Authority, a decision he is appealing.

In December 2021 Kelly, who has been permanently banned from Facebook, was nominated by the crossbench and appointed to a parliamentary committee looking into social media and online safety, along with two Opposition MPs.

Also in December 2021, Kelly was labelled one of Australia’s most unpopular political figures, following a Resolve Political Monitor survey that showed that only 9% of surveyed Australians had a positive view of him. This was only slightly higher than Clive Palmer who was viewed positively by 8% of Australians, according to the survey.

During the 2022 election campaign, Kelly chose to display signs with his name being more prominent than the name of the United Australia Party, as Kelly thought he could be re-elected on the strength of his own personal brand. During the 2022 election campaign, Kelly was egged in a Melbourne park.

In the 2022 election, Kelly won around 8% of the vote, coming fourth behind both major parties and an independent, and Jenny Ware, representing the Liberal Party, won Hughes.

After the election, Kelly was appointed national director of the UAP.

Kelly was sued by the AEC for displaying non-compliant signage during the election campaign, who argued that the 8 point font used for who authorised the advertisement on an early print run of Kelly's signs was not noticeable enough and although a later print run with larger font was made, the original signs remained in use until the election. The AEC's case against Kelly was dismissed by the federal court in July 2023.

Kelly called for Scott Morrison to resign after it was revealed that Morrison had secretly been appointed to several ministerial positions.

During a case between a former Kelly staffer and his chief of staff, Frank Zumbo, the former staffer claimed that she didn't speak up about the sexual harassment because she feared retribution. Kelly maintained in March 2021 that no-one had any complaints about Zumbo, despite former staffers saying they had raised specific complaints about Zumbo with Kelly in 2013.

=== 2023 New South Wales state election ===
Kelly registered as an independent candidate for the 2023 New South Wales state election in the New South Wales Legislative Council. He was not elected, gaining 3498 first preference votes.

=== Pauline Hanson's One Nation (2024) ===
On 27 February 2024, Kelly left the UAP to join Pauline Hanson's One Nation as the party's federal campaign director. He left the party in September of the same year.

=== Libertarian Party (since 2024) ===
On 2 December 2024, Kelly announced via 2GB he had joined the Libertarian Party and would contest a Senate seat at the 2025 federal election. He stood as the lead Libertarian candidate in New South Wales, as part of the Australia First Alliance, where the party ran on a joint ticket with Gerard Rennick People First and HEART. Australia First received 92,892 first-preferences (1.9%), placing them a distant seventh.

== Political positions ==
Kelly was formerly part of the conservative right-wing faction inside the Liberal Party. Kelly put his support behind a plebiscite into same-sex marriage, and he inaccurately predicted that the majority would vote against it. He stated on his Facebook page that he would vote with what his electorate wanted in the marriage survey. In the conscience votes which sought to amend the Marriage Amendment (Definition and Religious Freedoms) Bill 2017, Kelly voted for all the amendments, none of which were passed. Kelly supports Australia's constitutional monarchy, and is a frequent guest on conservative network Sky News Australia often speaking on subjects related to the parliamentary environmental and energy committee. While a member of this committee, Kelly criticised the Turnbull government's position on energy. Kelly replaced Ross Cameron on Sky program Outsiders after Cameron was fired, becoming a regular co-host. With Kelly's Facebook page having high engagement, the Sydney Morning Herald called Kelly "one of Australia's most influential politicians" on the platform.

In the aftermath of the 2021 storming of the United States Capitol by pro-Donald Trump rioters, Kelly shared a debunked Washington Times article that falsely claimed facial-recognition technology had recognized members of antifa among the attackers. Kelly commented that "neo-fascists and Marxists had engaged in a highly co-ordinated 'false flag' operation, by infiltrating the protest and invading the capital so that the world’s media would falsely blame and discredit Trump supporters." Kelly did note the correction by the Washington Times but said he would not retract his post, citing other evidence such as a New York Post story citing an unnamed law enforcement official who claimed to recognize two members of antifa as well as a Twitter video showing an unidentified person being discouraged from vandalism. Kelly also criticised Facebook for flagging a Donald Trump video in which Trump made false claims about fraud in the 2020 United States presidential election and praised the mob, arguing that fraud was a greater threat to democracy than the storming of the Capitol.

Kelly was one of only three members of the House of Representatives to speak against the proposal to change the Australian Constitution to enable the Federal Government to place any terms and conditions on financial assistance given to local government councils. He cited the built in checks and balances of the constitution and its longevity as a reason for opposing the change.

Kelly opposes the proposed voice to parliament described in the Uluru Statement from the Heart, which intends to recognise Indigenous Australians in Australia's Constitution. He described it as "divisive", and as a reverse form of apartheid. He has suggested that he would actively campaign for the "No" side in the referendum for constitutional recognition of Indigenous Australians.

=== COVID-19 ===
Kelly's views on the COVID-19 pandemic were described as "crackpot" by Omar Khorshid, the head of the Australian Medical Association. Kelly has said that forcing children to wear masks is child abuse, though this post was later removed by Facebook. Kelly advocated for hydroxychloroquine to be used in Australia to prevent COVID-19. The majority of research says that it has no clinical benefit to COVID-19 treatment, and may have negative side effects, including a possible increased risk of mortality. Some of these posts were removed by Facebook. Kelly has also posted conspiracy theories about Bill Gates requiring that the world population be vaccinated. Kelly has also given a speech in parliament supporting his views on hydroxychloroquine, and posted on his Facebook page a call for the deputy chief medical officer, Nick Coatsworth, to resign, which he later removed. Kelly and Coatsworth have reportedly "agreed to disagree" on hydroxychloroquine. Kelly has stated that he would not vaccinate himself or his children if a vaccine became approved by the Therapeutic Goods Administration (TGA), later clarifying that he was not anti-vax. He then switched to promoting Ivermectin, which is a head lice, rosacea, intestinal strongyloidiasis, and onchocerciasis medication, as a COVID-19 treatment, despite there being insufficient data for its use in treatment of COVID-19. The Chief Medical Officer, Paul Kelly, has stated that Craig Kelly's posts are "not scientifically based".

Royal Australian College of General Practitioners President Karen Price criticised Kelly for his 2021 appearance on a podcast with Pete Evans, who "spread[s] alarming misinformation, including content linked to the QAnon conspiracy theory and COVID-19 denialist claims". Kelly reassured Evans that the government would not mandate vaccines for COVID-19.

After Kelly clashed with Labor Party politician Tanya Plibersek in the halls of parliament over the issue, leading Plibersek to label him a "taxpayer-funded nong"; Prime Minister Scott Morrison also reprimanded Kelly. Kelly later released a statement to the press after his meeting with Morrison; however, his Facebook page was still replete with posts on ivermectin and hydroxychloroquine. Two days after being reprimanded, Kelly again posted about COVID-19 treatments on his Facebook page.

Kelly had been lobbying Minister for Health and Aged Care Greg Hunt and the head of the TGA to try to influence their recommendations to the National COVID-19 Clinical Evidence Taskforce, ceasing only when his correspondence was subject to freedom of information applications. Kelly was also banned by Facebook for a week over his COVID-19 posting. Kelly has called for the halt of the AstraZeneca vaccine rollout in Australia. On 26 April 2021, Facebook permanently removed Kelly's account, saying that he had continued to breach their misinformation policies, and on 28 April his backup and Instagram accounts were removed. Kelly has shared a draft of a "bill that would outlaw restrictions on anyone who doesn't get a COVID-19 vaccine". The bill includes constitutional problems such as not allowing for people who want to restrict who comes into their home. In late July 2021, Kelly addressed a Brisbane anti-lockdown protest via telephone, and was banned from Twitter for a week.

On 15 September 2021, lawyers for the Therapeutic Goods Administration (TGA) threatened Kelly with legal action, alleging the United Australia Party breached copyright and demanded that it stop distributing incomplete extracts of adverse event reports relating to COVID-19 vaccines which the TGA believes could be seriously misleading.

In November 2021, the Australian Skeptics, an organisation that investigates pseudoscientific claims and medical misinformation, awarded Kelly the "Bent Spoon", presented since 1982 "to the perpetrator of the most preposterous piece of paranormal or pseudoscientific piffle". The Australian Skeptics cited, "spreading misinformation about COVID and vaccinations, and offering dubious cures and conspiracy theories".

=== Climate change and renewable energy ===
Described as a "serial denier of climate change", Kelly was appointed chair of the backbench environment and energy committee, giving advice to environment minister Josh Frydenberg. He has previously written that convict arrivals to Australia in the 18th century found the weather warmer than in recent years, and has invited climate deniers from the Institute of Public Affairs to present to the government prior to the Paris Agreement. Kelly advocates for a "hockey-stick" approach to meeting the Paris 2030 emissions target for the energy industry, which has been characterised as delaying action to the last possible moment. Kelly has criticised renewable energy, saying that it causes higher electricity bills, which would kill people, according to Kelly. Kelly has written to NSW education minister Rob Stokes, complaining that a high school textbook published by Pearson Education had described Tony Abbott as a climate change denier.

Kelly opposed carbon pricing in Australia and in 2012 addressed a rally of about 2,000 people on the issue in Hyde Park, describing the carbon pricing as a "poisonous, toxic tax" and claiming the Federal Labor government was destroying Australia's prosperity by undermining the country's competitive advantage. He also stated that "Every Coalition member will sign a blood oath to get rid of this tax."

Kelly has been a critic of federal subsidies for industrial wind farms. In a speech in parliament he criticised the use of federal funds to obtain wind power of "questionable reliability" in favour of spending on other critical social needs. He attended a "wind power fraud rally" of 150 people in front of Parliament House, Canberra, which called for the abolition of the renewable energy target and a ban on new wind farms.

Kelly was one of the members of the Monash Forum ginger group which aimed to influence the design of the National Energy Guarantee. The group advocated for a "Hazelwood 2.0" coal-fired power station to be built. Other confirmed members of the forum include Tony Abbott, Eric Abetz, Kevin Andrews, Barnaby Joyce, George Christensen, and Ian Goodenough. Kelly has stated that Labor's proposed increases in the emissions reduction target undermines policy certainty, and has stated that the emissions reduction target for the agriculture industry in Australia could result in farmers having to cull their livestock. Kelly has warned that Josh Frydenberg's offer to the states of a review of the NEG emissions target in 2024 could lead to the target being reduced from its current level of 26%. Kelly also began the Parliamentary Friends of Coal Exports, which was joined by Joel Fitzgibbon, Mike Freelander, Meryl Swanson, Milton Dick, George Christensen, Kevin Andrews and Phillip Thompson.

Kelly was stopped from appearing on Australian TV show Q&A during the election campaign by Prime Minister Scott Morrison. Kelly was preparing charts to display during the program supporting his views on climate change.

In September 2018, speaking at a Liberal Party function, Kelly stated that the Pacific island of Tuvalu was growing, not sinking, as evidence in favour of his climate scepticism. In September 2019, at a monarchist league dinner, he claimed that this increase was because coral islands float, further complaining that this was not reported on Australia's public broadcast network, the Australian Broadcasting Corporation.

In January 2020, he was heavily criticised through global media for an appearance on UK television, in which he denied climate change was a contributing factor to the 2019–20 Australian bushfires. Kelly was further criticised for racism and misogyny after referring to meteorologist Laura Tobin as an "ignorant pommy weather girl" who had "no idea what she's talking about", despite her university degree in physics and meteorology. Tobin told Kelly that "You're not a climate skeptic, you're a climate denier", and host Piers Morgan labelled Kelly a "disgrace" who should "wake up". Emergency Management Minister David Littleproud, Treasurer Josh Frydenberg and Prime Minister Scott Morrison distanced themselves from Kelly's comments, and NSW Energy and Environment Minister Matt Kean said that "Craig Kelly is as qualified to talk about atmospheric physics as he is to perform brain surgery". During this bushfire season, Kelly also implied that environmentalists were responsible for arson.

Kelly supports Advance Australia's attempts to introduce educational materials to schools that falsely describe climate change as a hoax.

Kelly has falsely claimed that 2020 was the coolest year ever, and has accused the Bureau of Meteorology of altering weather records.

== Personal life ==
Kelly has a daughter and a son. His son has Down syndrome and has been diagnosed with autism. Kelly's maternal grandfather was born in South Africa, which Kelly believes was because of his great-grandparents' pursuit of migrating to Australia from the United Kingdom via South Africa.

In 2021 Kelly sold his family home in the Sutherland Shire and purchased a new home approximately 100 km from his electorate in Narara on the New South Wales Central Coast.

Parliament of Australia
Preceded by Danna Vale	Member for Hughes; 2010–2022	Succeeded by Jenny Ware
