= 1984 Hughes by-election =

- 18 February 1984
	First party	Second party
Candidate	Robert Tickner	Clifford Mason
Party	Labor	Liberal
Popular vote	40,728	22,962
Percentage	58.1%	32.7%
Swing	▼3.5pp	▲4.3pp
TPP	63.0%	37.0%
TPP swing	▼5.3pp	▲5.3pp
MP before election
Les Johnson
Labor
Elected MP
Robert Tickner
Labor

A by-election was held for the Australian House of Representatives seat of Hughes on 18 February 1984. This was triggered by the resignation of Labor Party MP Les Johnson to become Australian High Commissioner to New Zealand. The by-election was held to coincide with the Corangamite and Richmond by-elections.

The election was won by Labor candidate Robert Tickner, despite a 5.3% swing to the Liberal Party.

== Candidates ==
- Australian Democrats – Ronald Hellyer.
- Independent – Leslie Johnson.
- Liberal Party of Australia – Clifford Mason.
- Australian National Action Group – Jim Saleam, a far-right activist who had previously been involved with the Australian Nazi Party.
- Australian Labor Party – Robert Tickner, a Sydney City Councillor.

== Results ==
Hughes by-election, 1984
Party	Candidate	Votes	%	±%
Labor	Robert Tickner	40,728	58.1	−3.5
Liberal	Clifford Mason	22,962	32.7	+4.3
Democrats	Ronald Hellyer	4,065	5.8	−3.3
Independent	Leslie Johnson	1,393	2.0	+2.0
National Action	Jim Saleam	970	1.4	+1.4
Total formal votes		70,118	97.9	
Informal votes		1,486	2.1	
Turnout		71,604	86.2	
Two-party-preferred result
Labor	Robert Tickner	44,162	63.0	−5.3
Liberal	Clifford Mason	25,956	37.0	+5.3
Labor hold		Swing	−5.3	

== See also ==
- List of Australian federal by-elections
