= David Moncrieff =

Australian politician

David Moncrieff MP

Member of the Australian Parliament for Hughes
- Incumbent
- Assumed office 3 May 2025
- Preceded by: Jenny Ware

Personal details
- Born: Sidney David Moncrieff; 1995 or 1996 (age 30–31)
- Party: Labor
- Occupation: Politician

Sidney David Moncrieff is an Australian politician. He was elected to the Australian House of Representatives at the 2025 Australian federal election for the Division of Hughes. Moncrieff studied economics and finance at the University of Wollongong and acted as a policy advisor for the New South Wales state member of parliament for Heathcote, Maryanne Stuart.

Parliament of Australia
Preceded by Jenny Ware	Member for Hughes; 2025–present	Incumbent
