= Robert Tickner =

Australian lawyer and politician (born 1951)

The Honourable Robert Tickner AO
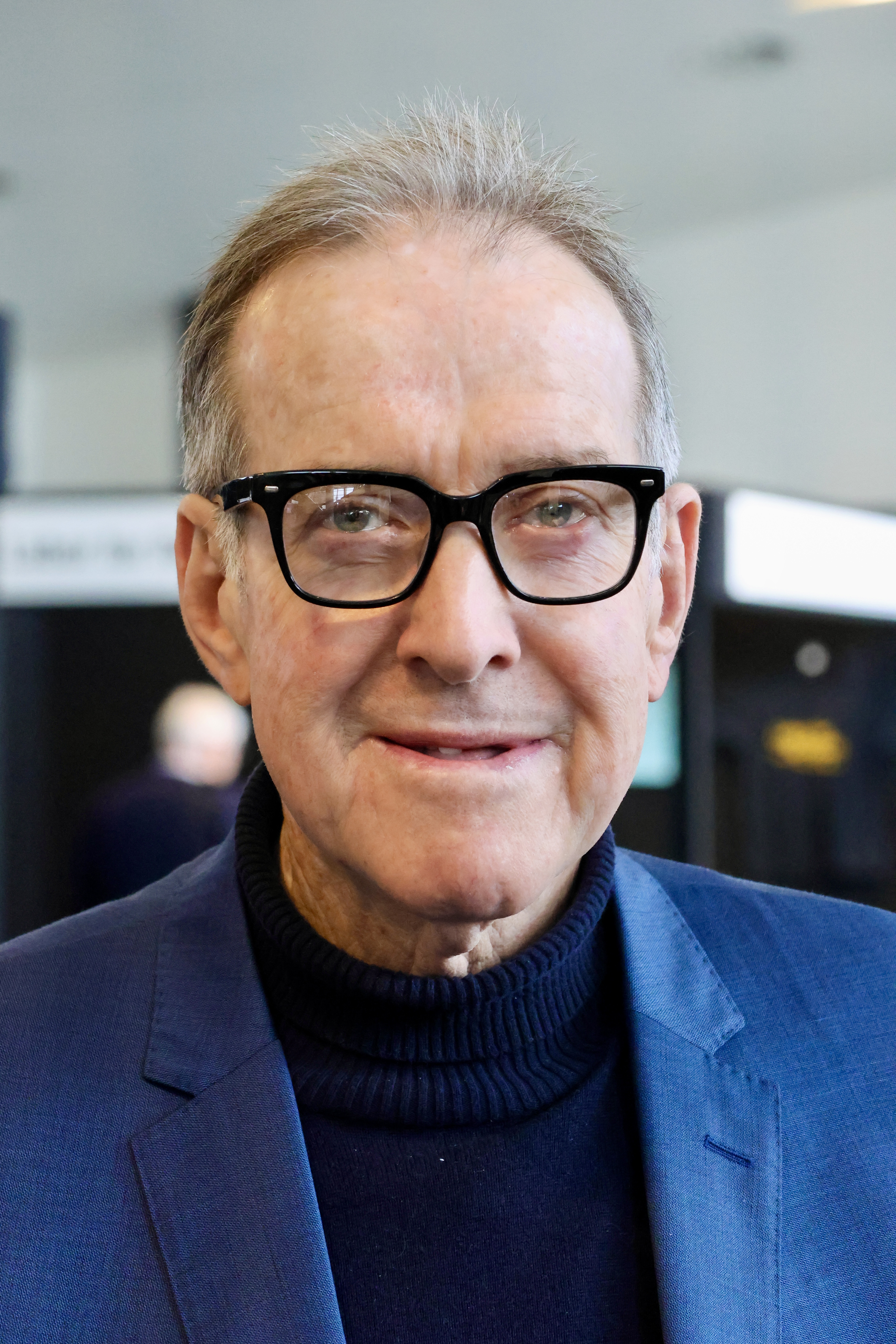
- Tickner in 2026

Minister for Aboriginal and Torres Strait Islander Affairs
- In office 4 April 1990 – 11 March 1996
- Prime Minister: Bob Hawke (1990–1991); Paul Keating (1991–1996)
- Preceded by: Gerry Hand
- Succeeded by: John Herron

Member of the Australian Parliament for Hughes
- In office 18 February 1984 – 2 March 1996
- Preceded by: Les Johnson
- Succeeded by: Danna Vale

Personal details
- Born: Robert Edward Tickner; 24 December 1951 (age 74) Sydney, New South Wales, Australia
- Party: Labor
- Spouse: Jody (sep. 1994)
- Children: 1
- Education: Taree High School
- Alma mater: University of Sydney (LLB; LLM; BEc)
- Profession: Lawyer
- Website: www.roberttickner.com

Robert Edward Tickner (born 24 December 1951) is an Australian lawyer, politician and humanitarian executive. He served as the federal Member for Hughes from 1984 to 1996 and as Minister for Aboriginal and Torres Strait Islander Affairs from 1990 to 1996. He was Secretary-General of the Australian Red Cross from 2005 to 2015 and has served as chair of the Justice Reform Initiative since 2020.

Tickner was born in Sydney but was adopted at infancy. Tickner grew up in Forster, New South Wales, as the son of adoptive parents. Having worked as a lawyer and served as the principal solicitor at the Aboriginal Legal Service, Tickner was elected to serve in the Australian House of Representatives in 1984, representing the New South Wales division of Hughes. Tickner was a member of the Australian Labor Party. Previously, he had served in the Sydney City Council between 1977 and 1984. Post-election in 1990, Tickner was appointed Minister for Aboriginal Affairs, then Minister for Aboriginal and Torres Strait Islander Affairs and Minister Assisting the Prime Minister for Aboriginal Reconciliation in the Hawke–Keating government. During his time as minister, he was involved in setting up the Council for Aboriginal Reconciliation, Stolen Generations inquiry, government response to the Royal Commission into Aboriginal Deaths in Custody and the Native Title Act 1993 following the Mabo judgement by the High Court.

The tenure of Tickner as minister saw him embroiled in the controversial Hindmarsh Island bridge dispute where his declaration, in 1994, halted the building of the bridge as per the provisions of the Aboriginal and Torres Strait Islander Heritage Protection Act 1984. This was eventually set aside by the Federal Court on procedural grounds. Further investigation into the matter continued even after his departure from parliament following the 1996 federal election. Since leaving parliament in 1996, Tickner has worked with people across party lines on humanitarian and public policy issues. He became chief executive of Job Futures and Secretary-General of the Australian Red Cross before assuming senior roles at the International Federation of Red Cross and Red Crescent Societies. He has since been chairman of various organisations that deal with humanitarian and justice issues including the Justice Reform Initiative.

== Early life and education ==
Tickner was born in Sydney on 24 December 1951 and was adopted as an infant. He grew up in Forster, New South Wales, with his adoptive parents Bert and Gwen Tickner. He attended Forster High School and Taree High School before completing a Bachelor of Laws and later a Master of Laws with honours at the University of Sydney in 1977. He subsequently completed a Bachelor of Economics in 1982 and later undertook the first stage of an Executive Master of Business Administration. Tickner later stated that his interest in the welfare of Aboriginal and Torres Strait Islander peoples developed during primary school after reading an official textbook that contained racist descriptions of people of mixed Aboriginal descent.

== Political career ==
=== Early career (1975–1984) ===
In the mid-1970s, Tickner served as convenor of the urban campaign for Friends of the Earth Australia in Sydney, where he organised campaigns opposing high-rise developments in Sydney's inner suburbs as part of the Green Bans movement. In 1975, he was involved in the organisation's campaign criticising the Sydney City Council's support for major inner-city developments despite environmental assessments raising concerns about their impacts. During this period, he leased the Friends of the Earth Sydney office, a three-storey terrace building on Crown Street, Surry Hills.

A member of the Australian Labor Party, Tickner served as Alderman for Flinders Ward from 17 September 1977 to 13 April 1984. During his time on the council, he was a member of the Works Committee and City Planning Committee in 1978; the City Health and Engineering Committee and Community Services Committee in 1979; the House Committee and the Works and Housing Committee in 1982; and chaired the Community Services and Health Committee from 1980 to 1981, the Housing, Properties and Public Works Committee in 1981, and the Finance and Industrial Relations Committee from 1982 to 1984. Alongside his council service, he was principal solicitor of the Aboriginal Legal Service from 1979 to 1983, taught business studies and law at the New South Wales Institute of Technology, and served as president of the Society of Labor Lawyers, and was acting Lord Mayor of Sydney for a brief period in 1983.

=== Member of Parliament (1984–1990) ===
Tickner was elected to the House of Representatives for the New South Wales seat of Hughes at a by-election held on 18 February 1984 following the resignation of Les Johnson. He served on the House of Representatives Standing Committee of Privileges from 28 February 1985 to 19 February 1990 and on the Joint Committee of Public Accounts from 28 February 1985 to 19 February 1990, chairing the committee from 25 February 1987. He was re-elected at the 1987 federal election. During his parliamentary career, he participated in several international parliamentary activities, including as a member of the parliamentary delegation to the Soviet Union and Poland in 1986, the 8th Australasian and Pacific Regional Parliamentary Seminar on Norfolk Island in 1986, and as leader of the parliamentary delegation to Singapore, Malaysia and Papua New Guinea from July to August 1988. He also attended the 34th Commonwealth Parliamentary Association Conference in Canberra in September 1988.

=== Hawke–Keating government (1990–1993) ===
Following the 1990 federal election, Tickner was appointed Minister for Aboriginal Affairs on 4 April 1990 and became Minister Assisting the Prime Minister for Aboriginal Reconciliation from 21 February 1991 to 24 March 1993. He was appointed Minister for Aboriginal and Torres Strait Islander Affairs on 19 December 1991. In this capacity, he incorporated reconciliation into Hawke government policy, with objectives focused on increasing public understanding of Aboriginal and Torres Strait Islander histories, cultures and contemporary issues; developing a formal instrument of reconciliation; and gaining broader political support for Indigenous rights and social justice. The policy assigned the Commonwealth government a role in public education and in supporting the development of a reconciliation agreement, while questions relating to Aboriginal sovereignty, land rights, customary law and compensation remained subjects for discussion within the reconciliation process.

In 1991, Tickner released a discussion paper proposing the introduction of an instrument of reconciliation by 2001 following extensive consultation with Aboriginal and Torres Strait Islander peoples and the wider Australian community. After discussions with the opposition, state and territory governments, the Aboriginal and Torres Strait Islander Commission, and other organisations, he helped establish the Council for Aboriginal Reconciliation to promote relations between Indigenous and non-Indigenous Australians and provide a non-partisan forum for reconciliation, including consideration of a formal reconciliation agreement. As Minister for Aboriginal and Torres Strait Islander Affairs during the Hawke–Keating government, he also oversaw the establishment of the inquiry into the Stolen Generations and contributed to the development of the national reconciliation process. He was involved in the Commonwealth's response to the Royal Commission into Aboriginal Deaths in Custody, the High Court's Mabo decision, and the development of the legislative framework that became the Native Title Act 1993. Tickner later said that cabinet discussions frequently involved disagreements with state governments and mining interests over native title, and that the consultation process following Mabo sought to establish a national framework balancing recognition of native title with legal certainty and negotiation. He also said he received threats during the debate over the legislation.

=== Hindmarsh Island bridge controversy (1993–2001) ===
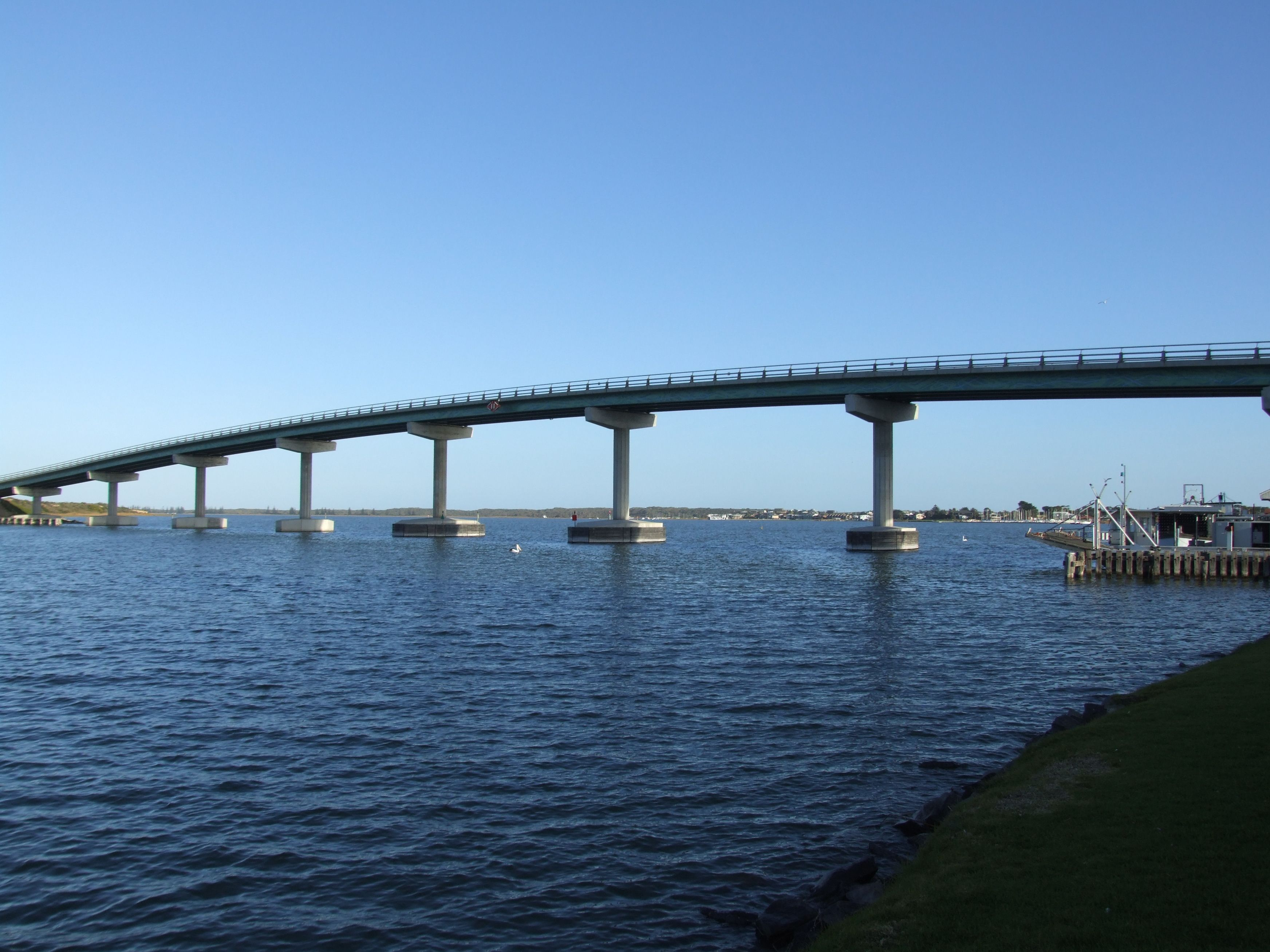
A boat passing beneath the Hindmarsh Island Bridge in February 2013

In late 1993, Tickner received representations from the Lower Murray Aboriginal Heritage Committee and the Aboriginal Legal Rights Movement (ALRM) seeking protection for the Hindmarsh Island area and surrounding sites under the Aboriginal and Torres Strait Islander Heritage Protection Act 1984. They argued that the proposed bridge between Goolwa and Hindmarsh Island would damage culturally significant Aboriginal sites. Despite these concerns, construction of the bridge continued. In April 1994, Doreen Kartinyeri informed the bridge developers that the island held spiritual significance connected to women's cultural practices and convened a meeting of Ngarrindjeri women, who subsequently requested that Tickner intervene to stop construction.

Following the request, Tickner commissioned legal academic Cheryl Saunders to prepare a report on the Aboriginal cultural significance of the area under the 1984 Act. The ALRM engaged anthropologist Deane Fergie to undertake a consultation process and prepare a report containing confidential appendices relating to women's cultural knowledge. Based on the material provided, Tickner issued a declaration on 10 July 1994 prohibiting construction of the bridge for 25 years on the grounds that the area was likely to be damaged or desecrated. The decision halted the project and contributed to the liquidation of the development company. In February 1995, the Federal Court overturned the declaration, finding that Tickner had not complied with the procedural requirements of the Act. The court held that he had relied on Saunders' report without personally considering the confidential information about Ngarrindjeri women's traditions that formed part of the report's basis. The Full Federal Court upheld the decision on appeal.

Later in 1995, the South Australian government established a Royal Commission to investigate the validity of the women's cultural claims. The Commission concluded that the claims were not substantiated, although some Ngarrindjeri women declined to disclose confidential cultural information during the inquiry. A group of Ngarrindjeri people, including both men and women who rejected the Commission's conclusions, subsequently sought further protection under the 1984 Act. Tickner commissioned a further investigation led by Federal Court Justice Jane Mathews, which was conducted confidentially, but the High Court later held that Federal Court judges could not be appointed to prepare reports under the Act. On 2 March 1996, Tickner lost his parliamentary seat following the defeat of the Labor government, ending his ministerial tenure, with the Hindmarsh Island controversy among the factors associated with his electoral defeat. He remains the longest-serving Minister for Aboriginal and Torres Strait Islander Affairs.

The Commonwealth Parliament subsequently passed the Hindmarsh Island Bridge Act 1997, removing the minister's power to make heritage protection declarations over the area. The High Court upheld the constitutional validity of the legislation. Bridge developers then commenced proceedings against Tickner, the Commonwealth, Saunders, Fergie and others, alleging losses arising from delays to the project and claiming negligence, misleading conduct, statutory torts, misfeasance in public office and, against the Commonwealth, unjust acquisition of property. During the litigation, Federal Court Justice John von Doussa ordered Tickner and Fergie in 2000 to disclose confidential material relating to Ngarrindjeri women's cultural traditions. In 2001, he dismissed the claims against Tickner, Saunders, Fergie and others, finding that the applicants had failed to establish that the restricted cultural knowledge had been fabricated and that Tickner and Saunders had not acted unlawfully or exceeded their statutory powers under the 1984 Act.

== Post-parliamentary career ==
After leaving federal politics, Tickner spent four years outside parliamentary life before becoming chief executive officer of Job Futures, a nationwide network of community-based employment service providers, in 2000. In February 2005, he was appointed Secretary-General of the Australian Red Cross. During his tenure, he criticised the organisation's federalised structure, arguing that its historical links to state and territory divisions limited its ability to respond effectively to national issues. As head of the Australian Red Cross, he oversaw the development of national partnerships with organisations including Coles Group, United Group and Domino's Pizza Enterprises to support fundraising, disaster relief and community programs. He also established Friends of the Red Cross groups at parliamentary and state levels and supported training programs for Aboriginal and Torres Strait Islander community workers in areas including family violence and health nutrition.

In 2012, Tickner was appointed Under Secretary-General for Humanitarian Values and Diplomacy at the International Federation of Red Cross and Red Crescent Societies (IFRC) in Geneva. He represented the IFRC at the Second Conference on the Humanitarian Impact of Nuclear Weapons in Nayarit, Mexico, in 2014 and served twice as acting Secretary-General of the IFRC. In 2013, he was involved in organising the General Assembly of the International Red Cross and Red Crescent Movement and Council of Delegates meetings held in Sydney, the first time the events were hosted in Australia. Tickner retired as chief executive officer of the Australian Red Cross in August 2015 and stated that he did not intend to return to federal politics.

Beginning on 19 January 2016, Tickner served as chair of the CHS Alliance board, succeeding Robert Glasser. Later that year, following the release of the 1992–93 Commonwealth Cabinet documents, he called for a national audit of the implementation of the recommendations of the Royal Commission into Aboriginal Deaths in Custody. He argued that governments at the Commonwealth, state and territory levels had not fully implemented the recommendations, lacked agreed monitoring and accountability mechanisms, and had failed to address increasing rates of Aboriginal and Torres Strait Islander incarceration and youth detention. In 2017, Tickner was appointed Monitor of the Memorandum of Understanding between Magen David Adom of Israel and the Palestine Red Crescent Society by the presidents of the IFRC and the International Committee of the Red Cross, with approval from the Standing Commission of the Red Cross and Red Crescent Movement. He was re-elected as chair of the CHS Alliance in November 2019.

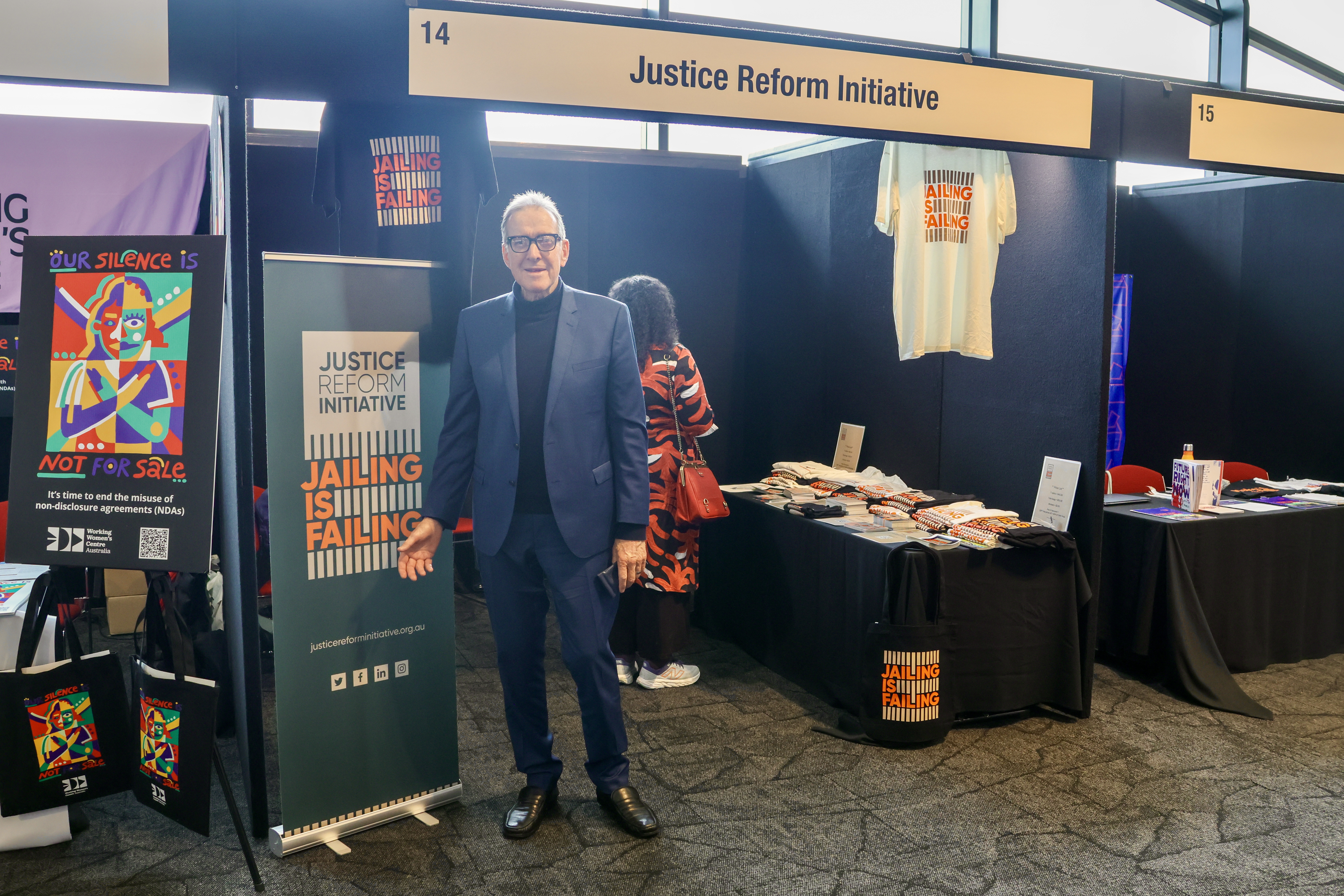
Tickner at the Justice Reform Initiative booth during the 2026 Australian Labor Party National Conference in Adelaide

The Justice Reform Initiative was founded on 21 April 2020, with Tickner as chair. The organisation advocates evidence-based reforms to the criminal justice system and seeks greater community support for changes to improve justice outcomes. In 2023, Tickner called on the Queensland government under Annastacia Palaszczuk to reform its approach to youth justice, arguing that changes in the treatment of young offenders were necessary for progress in Indigenous reconciliation. Later that year, he travelled to Tasmania to advocate for greater emphasis on crime prevention rather than punitive approaches. As a founder of the Justice Reform Initiative, Tickner has called on continuing relevance of the Royal Commission into Aboriginal Deaths in Custody, noting that while governments had supported 338 of the commission's 339 recommendations, further action was needed on social factors associated with offending, including employment, education, housing, healthcare, early childhood development, family breakdown and poverty.

Tickner has also served as an ambassador for the International Campaign to Abolish Nuclear Weapons Australia. As of 2026, he serves as co-chair of the EveryAGE Counts board.

== Honours ==
Tickner received an appointment as an Officer of the Order of Australia (AO) in the 2017 Queen's Birthday Honours for services to the community through leadership positions at the Australian Red Cross, and to the Parliament of Australia.

== Personal life ==
Tickner married Jody, with whom he separated in 1994. After the death of his adoptive father, the deterioration of his adoptive mother's health, and the birth of his son Jack, he sought contact with his birth family. In 1993, after more than 40 years apart, Tickner was reunited with his birth mother, Maida, and later met his birth father, Len, about eighteen months afterwards, developing relationships with his biological siblings through his father. He later said that the circumstances of his adoption had caused his birth mother long-term emotional distress, and Maida remained connected with Tickner's family until her death. He had previously lived in Surry Hills before relocating to Corrimal, near Stanwell Park, New South Wales, in 1983.

During his university years, while living in a hostel in Woolloomooloo, Tickner developed an interest in wine and later described a preference for red wine, particularly pinot noir and shiraz. He stated that he generally avoided drinking alcohol during work due to his professional responsibilities. After leaving federal politics in the late 1990s and moving to Balmain, he took up kayaking on Sydney Harbour.

In 2001, he published Taking a Stand: Land Rights to Reconciliation, an autobiography covering his six years as a federal minister and focusing on Aboriginal affairs policies during that period. In 2020, he published Ten Doors Down, a memoir about his reunion with his birth mother and the effects of Australia's former adoption practices on birth parents and adopted children.

Parliament of Australia
Preceded by Les Johnson	Member for Hughes; 1984 –1996	Succeeded by Danna Vale
