= Division of Hughes =

Australian federal electoral division

Coordinates: 33.992°S 150.975°E

Hughes Australian House of Representatives Division
- Interactive map of electorate boundaries from the 2025 federal election
- Created: 1955
- MP: David Moncrieff
- Party: Labor
- Namesake: Billy Hughes
- Electors: 114,925 (2025)
- Area: 380 km^{2} (146.7 sq mi)
- Demographic: Outer metropolitan

The Division of Hughes is an Australian electoral division in the state of New South Wales.

== History ==
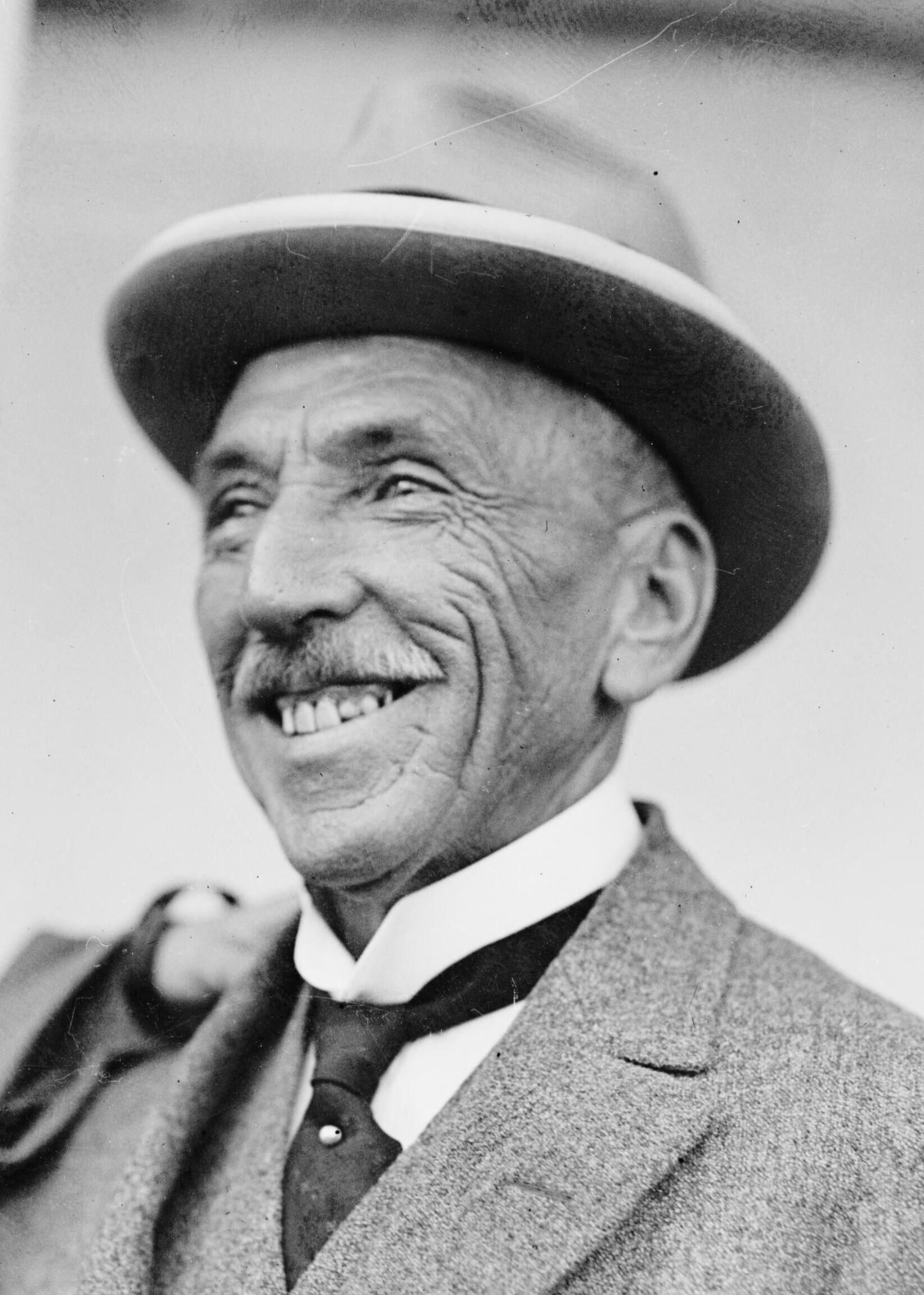
Billy Hughes, the division's namesake

The division was created in 1955 and is named for Billy Hughes, who was Prime Minister of Australia from 1915 to 1923. Originally a marginal Labor seat, it was taken by the Liberals in their 1966 landslide. However, the Liberal margin was redistributed away in 1968 when most of its Liberal-friendly territory was shifted to newly created Cook, and Labor won it back on a large swing. It remained in Labor hands for the next quarter-century, though it became increasingly marginal from 1984 onward.

It was one of many marginal seats taken by the Liberals in the 1996 landslide. The Liberals held it up until 2025, although they came close to losing it in the 2007 Labor landslide – and for 30 years it was generally considered to be a safe Liberal seat.

The member for Hughes between the 2010 federal election and the 2022 election was Craig Kelly. He served as a Liberal until he resigned from the party to sit as an independent in February 2021, before joining Clive Palmer's United Australia Party in August 2021. In the 2022 election, the Liberals won the seat back, with Jenny Ware becoming the new MP.

A redistribution prior to the 2025 election resulted in the losses of some Liberal-voting areas at the Sutherland Shire and the gains of Labor-voting areas at the City of Campbelltown. This halved the Liberal margin from 7.0% to 3.5%. Ware was subsequently defeated after one term by Labor's David Moncrieff at the election amid the Liberals' collapse in metropolitan Australia.

== Boundaries ==
Since 1984, federal electoral division boundaries in Australia have been determined at redistributions by a redistribution committee appointed by the Australian Electoral Commission. Redistributions occur for the boundaries of divisions in a particular state, and they occur every seven years, or sooner if a state's representation entitlement changes or when divisions of a state are malapportioned.

When the division was created in 1955, it covered all of Sutherland Shire and also covered areas to the south up to Austinmer in northern Wollongong, which were all previously in the Division of Werriwa. In the 1968 redistribution, areas in the eastern Sutherland Shire were lost to create the new Division of Cook. At the same redistribution, the division of Hughes was also expanded southwards into more areas of northern Wollongong up to Corrimal.

In 1977, the division was expanded towards City of Liverpool in the northwest, covering areas like Moorebank, but stopping short of the suburb of Liverpool at the Georges River. In 1983, it lost most areas in northern Wollongong, with the boundaries cut back to exclude Austinmer. The division boundaries then remained similar for the next twenty years with minor boundary changes during redistributions, mostly around Moorebank and Sutherland.

Between 1992 and 2006, the division shared its western and northern boundaries with the Georges River. In 2000, the division lost all areas outside Sydney south of Waterfall to Cunningham, as well as most of the Royal National Park including Maianbar and Bundeena to Cook. In 2006, the division crossed the Georges River and expanded to cover the suburbs of Liverpool and Warwick Farm. In 2009, its boundary to the south was further pulled back to the Heathcote Road in Engadine, losing the remaining portions of the Royal National Park, Waterfall and Heathcote.

The 2006 and 2009 redistributions were reversed in 2016, with the division largely reverting to its 2000–2006 boundaries. It also regained eastern Royal National Park, Maianbar and Bundeena that it had lost in 2000. In 2024, it crossed the Georges River in the west again, this time expanding to cover areas in the City of Campbelltown, such as Glenfield and Macquarie Fields. It also lost areas in the Sutherland Shire.

Since 2025, the division is located in southern and southwestern Sydney, including parts of the Sutherland Shire, Liverpool City and Campbelltown City. The division shares its southern boundary with the southern boundaries of City of Liverpool and Sutherland Shire, and shares its northern boundary with the Georges River between Moorebank/Milperra and Como. Suburbs within each local government area include:

- Sutherland Shire: Alfords Point, Audley, Bangor, Barden Ridge, Bonnet Bay, Bundeena, Como, Engadine, Garie Beach, Heathcote, Illawong, Loftus, Lucas Heights, Maianbar, Menai, Sandy Point, Waterfall, Woronora, Woronora Heights, and Yarrawarrah; as well as parts of Jannali, Sutherland, and Royal National Park.
- Liverpool City: Hammondville, Holsworthy, Pleasure Point, Voyager Point and Wattle Grove; as well as parts of Casula and Moorebank. The Liverpool Military Area—comprising Holsworthy Barracks and Steele Barracks—is also located in the electorate.
- Campbelltown City: Ingleburn, Long Point, Macquarie Fields and Macquarie Links; as well as parts of Bardia and Glenfield.

== Members ==
Image	Member	Party	Term	Notes
	Les Johnson (1924–2015)	Labor	10 December 1955 – 26 November 1966	Lost seat
	Don Dobie (1927–1996)	Liberal	26 November 1966 – 25 October 1969	Transferred to the Division of Cook
	Les Johnson (1924–2015)	Labor	25 October 1969 – 19 December 1983	Served as minister under Whitlam. Resigned to become Australian High Commissioner to New Zealand
	Robert Tickner (1951–)	Labor	18 February 1984 – 2 March 1996	Served as minister under Hawke and Keating. Lost seat
	Danna Vale (1944–)	Liberal	2 March 1996 – 19 July 2010	Served as minister under Howard. Retired
	Craig Kelly (1963–)	Liberal	21 August 2010 – 23 February 2021	Lost seat
	Craig Kelly (1963–)	Independent	23 February 2021 – 23 August 2021	Lost seat
	Craig Kelly (1963–)	United Australia	23 August 2021 – 21 May 2022	Lost seat
	Jenny Ware (1970–)	Liberal	21 May 2022 – 3 May 2025	Lost seat
	David Moncrieff	Labor	3 May 2025 – present	Incumbent

== Election results ==
2025 Australian federal election: Hughes
Party	Candidate	Votes	%	±%
Labor	David Moncrieff	38,331	39.00	+11.08
Liberal	Jenny Ware	35,831	36.45	−3.95
Greens	Catherine Dyson	11,221	11.42	+4.99
One Nation	Deborah Swinbourn	5,253	5.34	+1.89
Trumpet of Patriots	Alex Scarfone	2,777	2.83	+2.83
Family First	Nathaniel Marsh	2,379	2.42	+2.42
Libertarian	Elvis Sinosic	1,917	1.95	+0.78
Citizens	David A. W. Miller	586	0.60	+0.60
Total formal votes		98,295	91.44	−3.39
Informal votes		9,205	8.56	+3.39
Turnout		107,500	93.57	+1.48
Two-party-preferred result
Labor	David Moncrieff	52,152	53.06	+6.52
Liberal	Jenny Ware	46,143	46.94	−6.52
Labor gain from Liberal		Swing	+6.52	
