= Danna Vale =

Australian politician

The Honourable Danna Vale
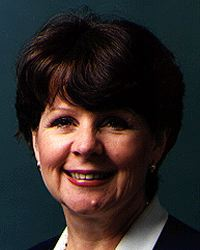

Minister for Veterans' Affairs
- In office 26 November 2001 – 26 October 2004
- Prime Minister: John Howard
- Preceded by: Bruce Scott
- Succeeded by: De-Anne Kelly

Member of the Australian Parliament for Hughes
- In office 2 March 1996 – 19 July 2010
- Preceded by: Robert Tickner
- Succeeded by: Craig Kelly

Personal details
- Born: Danna Sue Ward; 14 November 1944 (age 82) Sydney, New South Wales, Australia
- Party: Liberal
- Spouse: Robert Vale
- Occupation: Solicitor

Danna Sue Vale (née Ward; born 14 November 1944) is a former Australian politician. A member of the Liberal Party, she served as Minister for Veterans' Affairs in the Howard government from 2001 to 2004, the first woman to hold the position. She was a member of the House of Representatives from 1996 to 2010, holding the New South Wales seat of Hughes.

== Early life ==
Vale was born in Sydney on 14 November 1944. She was the oldest of six children born to Albert and Delma Ward; her father was a World War II veteran and her maternal grandfather Donald Dempsey was killed in World War I, along with two of his brothers. She grew up in the suburb of Sylvania, leaving school at the age of 14 and working as an office girl. By working multiple jobs she saved money to take flying lessons, achieving a pilot's licence at the age of 20. Following her marriage Vale was a stay-at-home mother for a number of years, eventually enrolling to study law at the University of Sydney in 1984. She graduated in 1988 with the degrees of Bachelor of Arts and Bachelor of Laws, subsequently working as a solicitor until her election to parliament.

== Political career ==
Vale joined the Liberal Party in 1993 and soon became president of the Gymea branch. She was elected to the House of Representatives at the 1996 federal election, defeating the incumbent Australian Labor Party (ALP) member and Keating government minister Robert Tickner. She was subsequently re-elected on four occasions, sitting for the Division of Hughes in New South Wales, in the southern outskirts of Sydney.

After serving on various House standing committees, Vale was elevated to the ministry in November 2001 as Minister for Veterans' Affairs and Minister Assisting the Minister for Defence, as part of a reshuffle after the 2001 federal election. In 2003 her department released a review of veterans' entitlements, although she quickly rejected its recommendation to means-test the Repatriation Health Card. In October 2003 the South Australian branch of the Returned and Services League of Australia (RSL) passed a motion of no-confidence in Vale, citing "a long standing problem of getting responses" and her late arrival and early departure from its annual general meeting. She was removed as assistant defence minister in the same month, and was not retained in the ministry after the 2004 election.

In 2004, Vale unwittingly became involved in the "cash for comment affair" when she mistakenly faxed a letter of support, meant for radio talkback host Alan Jones of 2GB, to Jones' former station 2UE. At the time, questions were being raised about the impartiality of David Flint, the head of the Australian Broadcasting Authority, when a letter of praise from Flint to Jones was revealed after the ABA had cleared Jones of wrongdoing. Vale's letter, urging Jones to "stay brave and true", was lampooned by the ABC TV program Media Watch, which adopted "Stay Brave and True" as its unofficial motto.

After losing her ministry, Vale joined the House of Representatives Standing Committee on Science and Innovation established to look at the technology of geosequestration of carbon dioxide. The committee reported in August 2007. However, Vale was one of four MPs issuing a dissenting report in which they stated, "We do not believe the evidence unequivocally supports the hypothesis of anthropogenic global warming". Among the evidence cited in the dissenting report were claims of global warming on other planets including Mars, Jupiter, Pluto, Neptune and Triton (a moon of Neptune). Vale was ridiculed in The Sydney Morning Herald and the local media for her views.

In August 2009 Vale announced she would not re-contest her seat at the 2010 federal election.

=== Political views ===
Vale notably opposed several of the Howard government's policies and proposals, often on local issues, in particular the proposed construction of a second Sydney airport at Holsworthy and a nuclear waste processing plant at Lucas Heights, both of which would have been located in her electorate. In the government's second term, she spoke against mandatory sentencing of juveniles in the Northern Territory. In June 2009, Vale was one of four Liberal MPs to support a Labor move to abolish the practice of charging asylum seekers the cost of their detention.

In 2006, Vale suggested that Australia is going to become a Muslim nation, as a result of Australians "aborting themselves out of existence" She made these comments in supporting a Coalition-backed amendment to a bill on the abortion drug RU486, and expressing concern at the rate of abortion by Australian women.

== Personal life ==
Vale raised four sons with her husband Bob.

Political offices
Preceded by Bruce Scott	Minister for Veterans' Affairs; 2001–04	Succeeded by De-Anne Kelly
Parliament of Australia
Preceded by Robert Tickner	Member for Hughes; 1996–2010	Succeeded by Craig Kelly
