= Les Johnson =

Australian politician (1924–2015)

The Honourable Les Johnson AM
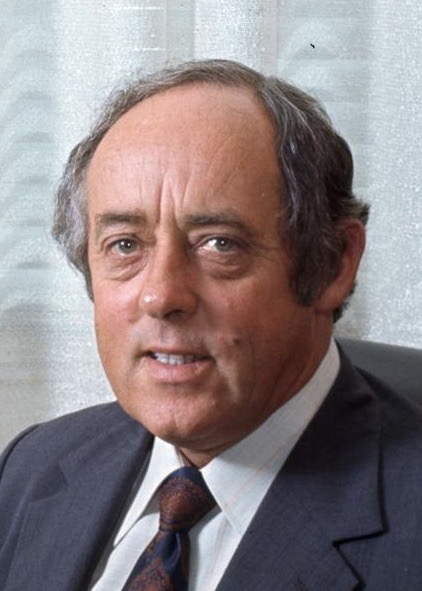

Minister for Aboriginal Affairs
- In office 6 June 1975 – 11 November 1975
- Prime Minister: Gough Whitlam
- Preceded by: Jim Cavanagh
- Succeeded by: Tom Drake-Brockman

Minister for Housing and Construction
- In office 30 November 1973 – 6 June 1975
- Prime Minister: Gough Whitlam
- Preceded by: Himself (Housing; Works)
- Succeeded by: John Carrick

Minister for Works
- In office 9 October 1973 – 30 November 1973
- Prime Minister: Gough Whitlam
- Preceded by: Jim Cavanagh
- Succeeded by: Himself (Housing & Construction)

Minister for Housing
- In office 19 December 1972 – 30 November 1973
- Prime Minister: Gough Whitlam
- Preceded by: Kevin Cairns
- Succeeded by: Himself (Housing & Construction)

Member of the Australian Parliament for Hughes
- In office 25 October 1969 – 19 December 1983
- Preceded by: Don Dobie
- Succeeded by: Robert Tickner
- In office 10 December 1955 – 26 November 1966
- Preceded by: New seat
- Succeeded by: Don Dobie

Personal details
- Born: 22 November 1924 Enfield, New South Wales, Australia
- Died: 26 May 2015 (aged 90)
- Party: Labor
- Spouse(s): (1) Gladys Jones (2) Marion Sharkey (nee Legge)
- Children: Grant, Sally, Jenny
- Occupation: fitter and turner, union organiser

Leslie Royston Johnson AM (22 November 1924 – 26 May 2015) was an Australian politician. He was a member of the Australian Labor Party (ALP) and held ministerial office in the Whitlam government, serving as Minister for Housing (1972–1973), Works (1973), Housing and Construction (1973–1975), and Aboriginal Affairs (1975). He represented the Division of Hughes in New South Wales for 25 years from 1955 to 1966 and from 1969 to 1983. He later served as High Commissioner to New Zealand from 1984 to 1985, cutting short his term due to his daughter's ill health.

== Early life ==
Johnson was born at Enfield, New South Wales on 22 November 1924. He initially worked as a boilermaker's mate before becoming an apprentice fitter and turner. He became active in the Amalgamated Engineering Union, serving as chair of its New South Wales Youth Committee. He later worked as an organiser for the Federated Clerks Union and ran a general store and newsagency at Gymea.

== Politics ==
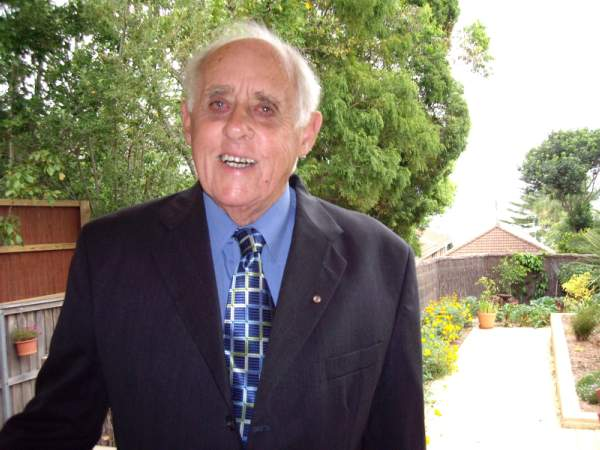
Johnson in 2006

Johnson was elected for the Australian Labor Party as the first member for the newly created House of Representatives seat of Hughes at the 1955 election. He held it until his defeat at the 1966 election by Liberal Don Dobie. However, a redistribution ahead of the 1969 election shifted most of the wealthier portions of Hughes to the newly created seat of Cook. The reconfigured Hughes now had a notional Labor majority of eight percent, making it a fairly safe Labor seat on paper. Believing this made Hughes impossible to hold, especially with Johnson priming for a rematch, Dobie transferred to Cook. This proved prescient, as Johnson retook Hughes on a large swing while Dobie narrowly won Cook. Johnson would hold Hughes without serious difficulty until 1983.

Following Labor's win at the December 1972 election, he was appointed to the Whitlam ministry as Minister for Housing. In October 1973, he was appointed to the additional portfolio of Works. In November the two portfolios were combined as Housing and Construction. In June 1975 he was moved to the Minister for Aboriginal Affairs. He lost this position as a result of the dismissal of the Whitlam government in November 1975. He subsequently became the Opposition Whip.

Labor returned to government at the March 1983 election, but Johnson did not stand for a place in the ministry. However, he was elected chairman of committees. He resigned from parliament in December 1983 so that he could become Australian High Commissioner to New Zealand. His position as High Commissioner was cut short following the serious illness of his daughter, Sally Anne Penman, who was diagnosed with breast cancer, and subsequently died in February 1988.

== Personal life ==
Les Johnson married Gladys (Peg) Jones in 1947, and she died in 2002. They had three children, Grant, Sally (deceased) and Jenny. In 2003 Les Johnson married Marion Sharkey, and they lived at Shoal Bay, NSW.

Johnson was made a Member of the Order of Australia (AM) in June 1990. He died on 26 May 2015, aged 90.

Political offices
Preceded by Gough Whitlam	Minister for Housing; 1972–1973	Merged into Housing and Construction
Preceded by Jim Cavanagh	Minister for Works; 1973	Merged into Housing and Construction
New title	Minister for Housing and Construction; 1973–75	Succeeded by Joe Riordan
Preceded by Jim Cavanagh	Minister for Aboriginal Affairs; 1975	Succeeded by Tom Drake-Brockman
Parliament of Australia
New division	Member for Hughes; 1955–1966	Succeeded by Don Dobie
Preceded by Don Dobie	Member for Hughes; 1969–1983	Succeeded by Robert Tickner
Diplomatic posts
Preceded by James Webster	Australian High Commissioner to New Zealand; 1984–1985	Succeeded by Bill McKinnon
