= Electoral results for the Division of Lindsay =

Australian division election results

This is a list of electoral results for the Division of Lindsay in Australian federal elections from the division's creation in 1984 until the present.

== Members ==
Member	Party	Term
Ross Free	Labor	1984–1996
Jackie Kelly	Liberal	1996–2007
David Bradbury	Labor	2007–2013
Fiona Scott	Liberal	2013–2016
Emma Husar	Labor	2016–2019
Melissa McIntosh	Liberal	2019–present

== Election results ==
=== Elections in the 2020s ===
==== 2025 ====
2025 Australian federal election: Lindsay
Party	Candidate	Votes	%	±%
Liberal	Melissa McIntosh			
Family First	Antony Victor Emmanuel			
Shooters, Fishers, Farmers	Shooters, Fishers and Farmers			
Independent	Jim Saleam			
Animal Justice	Animal Justice			
One Nation	Christopher Buckley			
HEART	Michelle Palmer			
Greens	Aaron David McAllister			
Labor	Hollie McLean			
Trumpet of Patriots	Joseph O'Connor			
Total formal votes				
Informal votes				
Turnout				

==== 2022 ====
2022 Australian federal election: Lindsay
Party	Candidate	Votes	%	±%
Liberal	Melissa McIntosh	48,939	46.73	+0.28
Labor	Trevor Ross	33,206	31.71	−3.90
Greens	Pieter Morssink	8,404	8.02	+3.11
One Nation	Max Jago	6,203	5.92	+5.92
United Australia	Joseph O'Connor	4,272	4.08	+1.17
Informed Medical Options	Rebekah Ray	2,075	1.98	+1.98
Liberal Democrats	Gareth McClure	1,627	1.55	+1.55
Total formal votes		104,726	93.11	+4.19
Informal votes		7,754	6.89	−4.19
Turnout		112,480	90.23	−2.02
Two-party-preferred result
Liberal	Melissa McIntosh	59,003	56.34	+1.30
Labor	Trevor Ross	45,723	43.66	−1.30
Liberal hold		Swing	+1.30	

Alluvial diagram for preference flows in the seat of Lindsay in the 2022 federal election. indicates at what stage the winning candidate had over 50% of the votes and was declared the winner.

=== Elections in the 2010s ===
==== 2019 ====
2019 Australian federal election: Lindsay
Party	Candidate	Votes	%	±%
Liberal	Melissa McIntosh	45,247	46.45	+7.16
Labor	Diane Beamer	34,690	35.61	−5.47
Greens	Nick Best	4,781	4.91	+1.33
United Australia	Christopher Buttel	2,831	2.91	+2.91
Independent	Mark Tyndall	2,785	2.86	+2.86
Conservative National	Brandon Lees	2,374	2.44	+2.44
Christian Democrats	Mark Moody-Basedow	1,997	2.05	−0.98
Australia First	Jim Saleam	1,372	1.41	+0.21
Sustainable Australia	Geoff Brown	1,326	1.36	+1.36
Total formal votes		97,403	88.92	+0.69
Informal votes		12,135	11.08	−0.69
Turnout		109,538	92.26	+0.03
Two-party-preferred result
Liberal	Melissa McIntosh	53,614	55.04	+6.15
Labor	Diane Beamer	43,789	44.96	−6.15
Liberal gain from Labor		Swing	+6.15	

==== 2016 ====
2016 Australian federal election: Lindsay
Party	Candidate	Votes	%	±%
Labor	Emma Husar	36,675	41.08	+2.05
Liberal	Fiona Scott	35,081	39.30	−7.35
Greens	Kingsley Liu	3,199	3.58	+0.52
Christian Democrats	Warren Wormald	2,701	3.03	+0.24
	Marcus Cornish	2,128	2.38	+2.38
Liberty Alliance	Stephen Roddick	2,110	2.36	+2.36
Xenophon	Stephen Lynch	1,850	2.07	+2.07
Family First	Linda La Brooy	1,513	1.69	+1.69
Justice	Scott Grimley	1,497	1.68	+1.68
Animal Justice	Deborah Blundell	1,454	1.63	+1.63
Australia First	Jim Saleam	1,068	1.20	+0.50
Total formal votes		89,276	88.23	−3.56
Informal votes		11,913	11.77	+3.56
Turnout		101,189	92.22	−2.07
Two-party-preferred result
Labor	Emma Husar	45,633	51.11	+4.10
Liberal	Fiona Scott	43,643	48.89	−4.10
Labor gain from Liberal		Swing	+4.10	

==== 2013 ====
2013 Australian federal election: Lindsay
Party	Candidate	Votes	%	±%
Liberal	Fiona Scott	40,882	46.64	+3.25
Labor	David Bradbury	34,212	39.03	−5.52
Palmer United	Andrew Wilcox	4,517	5.15	+5.15
Greens	David Lenton	2,679	3.06	−1.68
Christian Democrats	Andrew Green	2,449	2.79	−0.22
One Nation	Jeffrey Lawson	1,901	2.17	+2.17
Australia First	Mick Saunders	610	0.70	−0.47
Stable Population	Geoff Brown	408	0.47	+0.47
Total formal votes		87,658	91.79	−0.04
Informal votes		7,837	8.21	+0.04
Turnout		95,495	94.32	−0.11
Two-party-preferred result
Liberal	Fiona Scott	46,446	52.99	+4.11
Labor	David Bradbury	41,212	47.01	−4.11
Liberal gain from Labor		Swing	+4.11	

==== 2010 ====
2010 Australian federal election: Lindsay
Party	Candidate	Votes	%	±%
Labor	David Bradbury	37,076	44.55	−6.24
Liberal	Fiona Scott	36,114	43.39	+4.71
Greens	Suzie Wright	3,944	4.74	+1.28
Christian Democrats	Andrew Green	2,502	3.01	−0.01
Independent	Geoff Brown	1,583	1.90	+1.90
Family First	John Phillips	1,032	1.24	+0.09
Australia First	Mick Saunders	976	1.17	+1.17
Total formal votes		83,227	91.83	−2.65
Informal votes		7,402	8.17	+2.65
Turnout		90,629	94.43	−1.45
Two-party-preferred result
Labor	David Bradbury	42,546	51.12	−5.16
Liberal	Fiona Scott	40,681	48.88	+5.16
Labor hold		Swing	−5.16	

=== Elections in the 2000s ===
==== 2007 ====
2007 Australian federal election: Lindsay
Party	Candidate	Votes	%	±%
Labor	David Bradbury	41,991	51.39	+11.68
Liberal	Karen Chijoff	31,176	38.15	−7.49
Greens	Lesley Edwards	2,759	3.38	−0.38
Christian Democrats	Andrew Green	2,498	3.06	+0.31
Independent	Lisa Harrold	953	1.17	+1.17
Family First	Iris Muller	915	1.12	−0.32
Independent	Kerry McNally	728	0.89	+0.89
Liberty & Democracy	Grant Bayley	689	0.84	+0.84
Total formal votes		81,709	94.46	+2.32
Informal votes		4,791	5.54	−2.32
Turnout		86,500	95.74	+0.31
Two-party-preferred result
Labor	David Bradbury	46,394	56.78	+9.70
Liberal	Karen Chijoff	35,315	43.22	−9.70
Labor gain from Liberal		Swing	+9.70	

==== 2004 ====
2004 Australian federal election: Lindsay
Party	Candidate	Votes	%	±%
Liberal	Jackie Kelly	35,119	48.07	+1.14
Labor	David Bradbury	27,117	37.12	+2.52
Greens	Gabrielle Worrall	2,547	3.49	+1.00
Christian Democrats	John Phillips	2,026	2.77	+0.13
Save the ADI Site	Barbie Bates	1,953	2.67	−0.60
One Nation	Louise Kedwell	1,367	1.87	−3.28
No GST	Garth Derrig	1,156	1.58	+0.85
Family First	Megan Watson	1,006	1.38	+1.38
Democrats	Geraldine Waters	615	0.84	−1.32
Citizens Electoral Council	Bruce Anderson	148	0.20	+0.20
Total formal votes		73,054	92.55	−1.31
Informal votes		5,880	7.45	+1.31
Turnout		78,934	95.34	−0.17
Two-party-preferred result
Liberal	Jackie Kelly	40,367	55.26	−0.21
Labor	David Bradbury	32,687	44.74	+0.21
Liberal hold		Swing	−0.21	

==== 2001 ====
2001 Australian federal election: Lindsay
Party	Candidate	Votes	%	±%
Liberal	Jackie Kelly	34,339	46.93	+4.47
Labor	David Bradbury	25,320	34.60	−3.48
One Nation	Bill Nixon	3,768	5.15	−5.06
Save the ADI Site	Geoff Brown	2,391	3.27	+3.27
Christian Democrats	John Phillips	1,930	2.64	+1.28
Greens	Lesley Edwards	1,819	2.49	+0.49
Democrats	Geraldine Waters	1,584	2.16	−0.78
Independent	Anthony David Courtney	727	0.99	+0.99
No GST	Jean M Eykamp	534	0.73	+0.73
Independent	Steve Lindsay-Henderson	400	0.55	+0.55
Independent	Graham Mitchell	236	0.32	+0.32
Non-Custodial Parents	Stephen Walker	122	0.17	+0.17
Total formal votes		73,170	93.86	−0.71
Informal votes		4,785	6.14	+0.71
Turnout		77,955	96.57	
Two-party-preferred result
Liberal	Jackie Kelly	40,590	55.47	+2.44
Labor	David Bradbury	32,580	44.53	−2.44
Liberal hold		Swing	+2.44	

=== Elections in the 1990s ===
==== 1998 ====
1998 Australian federal election: Lindsay
Party	Candidate	Votes	%	±%
Liberal	Jackie Kelly	31,872	41.70	−0.82
Labor	Cathy O'Toole	29,903	39.12	−1.20
One Nation	Rick Putra	7,621	9.97	+9.97
Democrats	Stephen Lear	2,221	2.91	−3.68
Greens	Lesley Edwards	1,518	1.99	−2.42
Christian Democrats	Jean Eykamp	1,047	1.37	−0.79
Independent	Steve Grim-Reaper	1,043	1.36	+1.36
Unity	Sidney Acker	475	0.62	+0.62
Independent	Dion Bailey	446	0.58	+0.58
Independent	David Lipman	166	0.22	+0.22
Independent	F Ivor	126	0.16	+0.16
Total formal votes		76,438	94.48	−1.94
Informal votes		4,467	5.52	+1.94
Turnout		80,905	96.02	−0.09
Two-party-preferred result
Liberal	Jackie Kelly	39,200	51.28	−0.30
Labor	Cathy O'Toole	37,238	48.72	+0.30
Liberal hold		Swing	−0.30	

==== 1996 by-election ====
1996 Lindsay by-election
Party	Candidate	Votes	%	±%
Liberal	Jackie Kelly	38,840	49.21	+6.69
Labor	Ross Free	23,758	33.56	−6.94
Against Further Immigration	Vince Townsend	4,224	5.97	+3.24
Shooters	Rodney Franich	2,042	2.88	+2.88
Greens	Lesley Edwards	1,502	2.12	−2.29
Call to Australia	Brian Grigg	1,254	1.77	−0.66
Democrats	Stephen Lear	1,182	1.67	−4.92
Independent	Kay Vella	933	1.32	+1.32
Independent	Vicki Aird	488	0.69	+0.69
Independent	Steve Grim-Reaper	270	0.38	+0.38
Independent	Robert Peacey	156	0.22	+0.22
Family Law Reform	David Archibald	150	0.21	+0.21
Total formal votes		70,799	96.36	−0.06
Informal votes		2,678	3.64	+0.06
Turnout		73,477	89.98	−6.14
Two-party-preferred result
Liberal	Jackie Kelly		56.55	+4.97
Labor	Ross Free		43.45	−4.97
Liberal hold		Swing	+4.97	

==== 1996 ====
1996 Australian federal election: Lindsay
Party	Candidate	Votes	%	±%
Liberal	Jackie Kelly	31,811	42.52	+5.91
Labor	Ross Free	30,168	40.32	−18.23
Democrats	John Wilson	4,929	6.59	+6.59
Greens	Lesley Edwards	3,299	4.41	+4.41
Against Further Immigration	Terry Cooksley	2,041	2.73	+2.73
Call to Australia	Brian Grigg	1,614	2.16	−2.68
Independent	Stephen Davidson	956	1.28	+1.28
Total formal votes		74,818	96.42	−0.45
Informal votes		2,778	3.58	+0.45
Turnout		77,596	96.12	−0.52
Two-party-preferred result
Liberal	Jackie Kelly	38,442	51.58	+11.80
Labor	Ross Free	36,088	48.42	−11.80
Liberal gain from Labor		Swing	+11.80	

==== 1993 ====
1993 Australian federal election: Lindsay
Party	Candidate	Votes	%	±%
Labor	Ross Free	40,509	58.55	+10.53
Liberal	Carolynn Bellantonio	25,326	36.61	+2.92
Call to Australia	Brian Grigg	3,350	4.84	+1.62
Total formal votes		69,185	96.87	+0.06
Informal votes		2,237	3.13	−0.06
Turnout		71,422	96.63	
Two-party-preferred result
Labor	Ross Free	41,658	60.22	+0.54
Liberal	Carolynn Bellantonio	27,513	39.78	−0.54
Labor hold		Swing	+0.54	

==== 1990 ====
1990 Australian federal election: Lindsay
Party	Candidate	Votes	%	±%
Labor	Ross Free	31,990	47.9	−4.5
Liberal	Barry Haylock	21,846	32.7	−4.2
Democrats	Paul Moritz	6,038	9.0	+0.6
New Australia	William Gayed	2,638	4.0	+4.0
Call to Australia	Brian Grigg	2,474	3.7	+3.7
Independent	David Thomas	1,743	2.6	+2.6
Total formal votes		66,729	96.8	
Informal votes		2,241	3.2	
Turnout		68,970	96.1	
Two-party-preferred result
Labor	Ross Free	40,004	60.1	+1.1
Liberal	Barry Haylock	26,562	39.9	−1.1
Labor hold		Swing	+1.1	

=== Elections in the 1980s ===
==== 1987 ====
1987 Australian federal election: Lindsay
Party	Candidate	Votes	%	±%
Labor	Ross Free	32,949	52.4	−5.1
Liberal	Glynis Hayne	23,193	36.9	+2.7
Democrats	Michael Gregory	5,276	8.4	+0.1
Independent	Ian Perry	1,414	2.3	+2.3
Total formal votes		62,832	95.1	
Informal votes		3,238	4.9	
Turnout		66,070	95.8	
Two-party-preferred result
Labor	Ross Free	37,033	59.0	−2.6
Liberal	Glynis Hayne	25,785	41.0	+2.6
Labor hold		Swing	−2.6	

==== 1984 ====
1984 Australian federal election: Lindsay
Party	Candidate	Votes	%	±%
Labor	Ross Free	32,609	57.5	−1.3
Liberal	Stuart Coppock	19,383	34.2	+0.0
Democrats	Kevin Crameri	4,683	8.3	+1.4
Total formal votes		56,675	92.8	
Informal votes		4,380	7.2	
Turnout		61,055	94.5	
Two-party-preferred result
Labor	Ross Free	34,885	61.6	−0.7
Liberal	Stuart Coppock	21,790	38.4	+0.7
Labor notional hold		Swing	−0.7	
