= Women in the Australian House of Representatives =

There have been 174 women in the Australian House of Representatives since the establishment of the Parliament of Australia. Women have had the right to both vote and sit in parliament since 1902. The first woman to run for the House of Representatives was Selina Anderson at the 1903 election for Dalley, but the first woman elected to the House was Dame Enid Lyons at the 1943 election for Darwin. At that election, the first woman member of the Senate was also elected, and there have been women members of the Senate continuously ever since. By contrast, the House of Representatives has had women members continuously only since 1980.

All states and territories have been represented by women in the House of Representatives. In the 48th Australian Parliament there are 69 women.

== List ==
- names in **bold** indicate women who have been appointed as Ministers, Assistant Ministers or Parliamentary Secretaries
- names in italics indicate entry into Parliament through a by-election
- * symbolises members who have sat as members in both the House of Representatives and the Senate.

#	Name	Party	Electoral Division	Period of service
1	**Dame Enid Lyons**	UAP, Liberal	Darwin (Tas.)	21 August 1943 – 19 March 1951 (retired)
2	Doris Blackburn	Independent Labor	Bourke (Vic.)	28 September 1946 – 10 December 1949 (defeated)
3	Kay Brownbill	Liberal	Kingston (SA)	26 November 1966 – 25 October 1969 (defeated)
4	Joan Child	Labor	Henty (Vic.)	18 May 1974 – 13 December 1975 (defeated); 18 October 1980 – 19 February 1990 (retired)
5	Elaine Darling	Labor	Lilley (Qld)	18 October 1980 – 2 February 1993 (retired)
5	**Ros Kelly**	Labor	Canberra (ACT)	18 October 1980 – 30 January 1995 (resigned)
7	**Wendy Fatin**	Labor	Canning (WA); Brand (WA)	5 March 1983 – 1 December 1984; 1 December 1984 – 29 January 1996 (retired)
7	**Jeannette McHugh**	Labor	Phillip (NSW); Grayndler (NSW)	5 March 1983 – 13 March 1993; 13 March 1993 – 29 January 1996 (retired)
7	Helen Mayer	Labor	Chisholm (Vic.)	5 March 1983 – 11 July 1987 (defeated)
10	Carolyn Jakobsen	Labor	Cowan (WA)	1 December 1984 – 13 March 1993 (defeated)
10	**Kathy Sullivan***	Liberal	Moncrieff (Qld)	1 December 1984 – 8 October 2001 (retired)
12	Mary Crawford	Labor	Forde (Qld)	11 July 1987 – 2 March 1996 (defeated)
12	Elizabeth Harvey	Labor	Hawker (SA)	11 July 1987 – 24 March 1990 (defeated)
14	**Fran Bailey**	Liberal	McEwen (Vic.)	24 March 1990 – 13 March 1993 (defeated); 2 March 1996 – 19 July 2010 (retired)
14	**Janice Crosio**	Labor	Prospect (NSW)	24 March 1990 – 31 August 2004 (retired)
14	**Chris Gallus**	Liberal	Hawker (SA); Hindmarsh (SA)	24 March 1990 – 13 March 1993; 13 March 1993 – 31 August 2004 (retired)
17	Maggie Deahm	Labor	Macquarie (NSW)	13 March 1993 – 2 March 1996 (defeated)
17	Mary Easson	Labor	Lowe (NSW)	13 March 1993 – 2 March 1996 (defeated)
17	Marjorie Henzell	Labor	Capricornia (Qld)	13 March 1993 – 2 March 1996 (defeated)
17	**Judi Moylan**	Liberal	Pearce (WA)	13 March 1993 – 5 August 2013 (retired)
17	Silvia Smith	Labor	Bass (Tas.)	13 March 1993 – 2 March 1996 (defeated)
17	**Trish Worth**	Liberal	Adelaide (SA)	13 March 1993 – 9 October 2004 (defeated)
23	**Carmen Lawrence**	Labor	Fremantle (WA)	12 March 1994 – 17 October 2007 (retired)
24	**Bronwyn Bishop***	Liberal	Mackellar (NSW)	26 March 1994 – 9 May 2016 (retired)
25	Trish Draper	Liberal	Makin (SA)	2 March 1996 – 17 October 2007 (retired)
25	Annette Ellis	Labor	Namadgi (ACT); Canberra (ACT)	2 March 1996 – 28 October 1998; 28 October 1998 – 19 July 2010 (retired)
25	Kay Elson	Liberal	Forde (Qld)	2 March 1996 – 17 October 2007 (retired)
25	**Teresa Gambaro**	Liberal (LNP)	Petrie (Qld); Brisbane (Qld)	2 March 1996 – 24 November 2007 (defeated); 21 August 2010 – 9 May 2016 (retired)
25	Joanna Gash	Liberal	Gilmore (NSW)	2 March 1996 – 5 August 2013 (retired)
25	Elizabeth Grace	Liberal	Lilley (Qld)	2 March 1996 – 3 October 1998 (defeated)
25	Pauline Hanson*	Independent, One Nation	Oxley (Qld)	2 March 1996 – 3 October 1998 (defeated)
25	Susan Jeanes	Liberal	Kingston (SA)	2 March 1996 – 3 October 1998 (defeated)
25	Ricky Johnston	Liberal	Canning (WA)	2 March 1996 – 3 October 1998 (defeated)
25	**De-Anne Kelly**	National	Dawson (Qld)	2 March 1996 – 24 November 2007 (defeated)
25	**Jackie Kelly**†	Liberal	Lindsay (NSW)	2 March 1996 – 11 September 1996 (disqualified); 19 October 1996 – 17 October 2007 (retired)
25	**Jenny Macklin**	Labor	Jagajaga (Vic.)	2 March 1996 – 11 April 2019 (retired)
25	**Sharman Stone**	Liberal	Murray (Vic.)	2 March 1996 – 9 May 2016 (retired)
25	**Danna Vale**	Liberal	Hughes (NSW)	2 March 1996 – 19 July 2010 (retired)
25	Andrea West	Liberal	Bowman (Qld)	2 March 1996 – 3 October 1998 (defeated)
40	**Julie Bishop**	Liberal	Curtin (WA)	3 October 1998 – 11 April 2019 (retired)
40	Anna Burke	Labor	Chisholm (Vic.)	3 October 1998 – 9 May 2016 (retired)
40	Jane Gerick	Labor	Canning (WA)	3 October 1998 – 10 November 2001 (defeated)
40	**Julia Gillard**	Labor	Lalor (Vic.)	3 October 1998 – 5 August 2013 (retired)
40	Jill Hall	Labor	Shortland (NSW)	3 October 1998 – 9 May 2016 (retired)
40	Kelly Hoare	Labor	Charlton (NSW)	3 October 1998 – 17 October 2007 (retired)
40	Kay Hull	National	Riverina (NSW)	3 October 1998 – 19 July 2010 (retired)
40	Julia Irwin	Labor	Fowler (NSW)	3 October 1998 – 19 July 2010 (retired)
40	Cheryl Kernot*	Labor	Dickson (Qld)	3 October 1998 – 10 November 2001 (defeated)
40	Kirsten Livermore	Labor	Capricornia (Qld)	3 October 1998 – 5 August 2013 (retired)
40	Jann McFarlane	Labor	Stirling (WA)	3 October 1998 – 9 October 2004 (defeated)
40	Margaret May	Liberal	McPherson (Qld)	3 October 1998 – 19 July 2010 (retired)
40	Michelle O'Byrne	Labor	Bass (Tas.)	3 October 1998 – 9 October 2004 (defeated)
40	**Tanya Plibersek**	Labor	Sydney (NSW)	3 October 1998 – present
40	**Nicola Roxon**	Labor	Gellibrand (Vic)	3 October 1998 – 5 August 2013 (retired)
55	Ann Corcoran	Labor	Isaacs (Vic)	12 August 2000 – 17 October 2007 (retired)
56	Leonie Short	Labor	Ryan (Qld)	17 March 2001 – 10 November 2001 (defeated)
57	Jennie George	Labor	Throsby (NSW)	10 November 2001 – 19 July 2010 (retired)
57	Sharon Grierson	Labor	Newcastle (NSW)	10 November 2001 – 5 August 2013 (retired)
57	Sharryn Jackson	Labor	Hasluck (WA)	10 November 2001 – 9 October 2004 (defeated); 24 November 2007 – 21 August 2010 (defeated)
57	**Catherine King**	Labor	Ballarat (Vic)	10 November 2001 – present
57	**Sussan Ley**	Liberal	Farrer (NSW)	10 November 2001 – 27 February 2026 (resigned)
57	Sophie Mirabella	Liberal	Indi (Vic)	10 November 2001 – 7 September 2013 (defeated)
57	Maria Vamvakinou	Labor	Calwell (Vic)	10 November 2001 – 28 March 2025 (retired)
64	**Sharon Bird**	Labor	Cunningham (NSW)	9 October 2004 – 11 April 2022 (retired)
64	**Justine Elliot**	Labor	Richmond (NSW)	9 October 2004 – present
64	**Kate Ellis**	Labor	Adelaide (SA)	9 October 2004 – 11 April 2019 (retired)
64	Louise Markus	Liberal	Greenway (NSW); Macquarie (NSW)	9 October 2004 – 21 August 2010; 21 August 2010 – 2 July 2016 (defeated)
64	Julie Owens	Labor	Parramatta (NSW)	9 October 2004 – 11 April 2022 (retired)
69	Jodie Campbell	Labor	Bass (Tas)	24 November 2007 – 19 July 2010 (retired)
69	**Julie Collins**	Labor	Franklin (Tas)	24 November 2007 – present
69	**Yvette D'Ath**	Labor	Petrie (Qld)	24 November 2007 – 7 September 2013 (defeated)
69	**Nola Marino**	Liberal	Forrest (WA)	24 November 2007 – 28 March 2025 (retired)
69	**Maxine McKew**	Labor	Bennelong (NSW)	24 November 2007 – 21 August 2010 (defeated)
69	Belinda Neal*	Labor	Robertson (NSW)	24 November 2007 – 19 July 2010 (retired)
69	**Melissa Parke**	Labor	Fremantle (WA)	24 November 2007 – 9 May 2016 (retired)
69	Kerry Rea	Labor	Bonner (Qld)	24 November 2007 – 21 August 2010 (defeated)
69	**Amanda Rishworth**	Labor	Kingston (SA)	24 November 2007 – present
69	Janelle Saffin	Labor	Page (NSW)	24 November 2007 – 7 September 2013 (defeated)
79	**Kelly O'Dwyer**	Liberal	Higgins (Vic)	5 December 2009 – 11 April 2019 (retired)
80	**Karen Andrews**	Liberal (LNP)	McPherson (Qld)	21 August 2010 – 28 March 2025 (retired)
80	Gai Brodtmann	Labor	Canberra (ACT)	21 August 2010 – 11 April 2019 (retired)
80	Natasha Griggs	Liberal (CLP)	Solomon (NT)	21 August 2010 – 2 July 2016 (defeated)
80	Deborah O'Neill*	Labor	Robertson (NSW)	21 August 2010 – 7 September 2013 (defeated)
80	**Jane Prentice**	Liberal (LNP)	Ryan (Qld)	21 August 2010 – 11 April 2019 (retired after losing preselection)
80	**Michelle Rowland**	Labor	Greenway (NSW)	21 August 2010 – present
80	Laura Smyth	Labor	La Trobe (Vic)	21 August 2010 – 7 September 2013 (defeated)
87	Lisa Chesters	Labor	Bendigo (Vic)	7 September 2013 – present
87	Sharon Claydon	Labor	Newcastle (NSW)	7 September 2013 – present
87	**Sarah Henderson**	Liberal	Corangamite (Vic)	7 September 2013 – 18 May 2019 (defeated)
87	**Michelle Landry**	National (LNP)	Capricornia (Qld)	7 September 2013 – present
87	Alannah MacTiernan	Labor	Perth (WA)	7 September 2013 – 9 May 2016 (retired)
87	Cathy McGowan	Independent	Indi (Vic)	7 September 2013 – 11 April 2019 (retired)
87	Karen McNamara	Liberal	Dobell (NSW)	7 September 2013 – 2 July 2016 (defeated)
87	**Clare O'Neil**	Labor	Hotham (Vic)	7 September 2013 – present
87	**Melissa Price**	Liberal	Durack (WA)	7 September 2013 – present
87	Joanne Ryan	Labor	Lalor (Vic)	7 September 2013 – present
87	Fiona Scott	Liberal	Lindsay (NSW)	7 September 2013 – 2 July 2016 (defeated)
87	Ann Sudmalis	Liberal	Gilmore (NSW)	7 September 2013 – 11 April 2019 (retired)
87	Lucy Wicks	Liberal	Robertson (NSW)	7 September 2013 – 21 May 2022 (defeated)
100	Terri Butler	Labor	Griffith (Qld)	8 February 2014 – 21 May 2022 (defeated)
101	**Anne Aly**	Labor	Cowan	2 July 2016 – present
101	Julia Banks	Liberal, Independent	Chisholm (Vic)	2 July 2016 – 18 May 2019 (defeated in Flinders)
101	**Linda Burney**	Labor	Barton (NSW)	2 July 2016 – 28 March 2025 (retired)
101	Nicolle Flint	Liberal	Boothby (SA)	2 July 2016 – 11 April 2022 (retired)
101	Emma Husar	Labor	Lindsay (NSW)	2 July 2016 – 11 April 2019 (retired after losing preselection)
101	Justine Keay	Labor	Braddon (Tas)	2 July 2016 – 10 May 2018 (resigned); 28 July 2018 – 18 May 2019 (defeated)
101	**Madeleine King**	Labor	Brand (WA)	2 July 2016 – present
101	Susan Lamb	Labor	Longman (Qld)	2 July 2016 – 10 May 2018 (resigned); 28 July 2018 – 18 May 2019 (defeated)
101	**Emma McBride**	Labor	Dobell (NSW)	2 July 2016 – present
101	Cathy O'Toole	Labor	Herbert (Qld)	2 July 2016 – 18 May 2019 (defeated)
101	Rebekha Sharkie	NXT/Centre Alliance	Mayo (SA)	2 July 2016 – 11 May 2018 (resigned); 28 July 2018 – present
101	Anne Stanley	Labor	Werriwa (NSW)	2 July 2016 – present
101	Meryl Swanson	Labor	Paterson (NSW)	2 July 2016 – present
101	Susan Templeman	Labor	Macquarie (NSW)	2 July 2016 – present
115	Ged Kearney	Labor	Batman (Vic); Cooper (Vic)	17 March 2018 – 18 May 2019; 18 May 2019 – present
116	Kerryn Phelps	Independent	Wentworth (NSW)	20 October 2018 – 18 May 2019 (defeated)
117	Katie Allen	Liberal	Higgins (Vic)	18 May 2019 – 21 May 2022 (defeated)
117	Bridget Archer	Liberal	Bass (Tas)	18 May 2019 – 3 May 2025 (defeated)
117	Angie Bell	Liberal	Moncrieff (Qld)	18 May 2019 – present
117	Libby Coker	Labor	Corangamite (Vic)	18 May 2019 – present
117	Helen Haines	Independent	Indi (Vic)	18 May 2019 – present
117	Celia Hammond	Liberal	Curtin (WA)	18 May 2019 – 21 May 2022 (defeated)
117	Gladys Liu	Liberal	Chisholm (Vic)	18 May 2019 – 21 May 2022 (defeated)
117	Fiona Martin	Liberal	Reid (NSW)	18 May 2019 – 21 May 2022 (defeated)
117	Melissa McIntosh	Liberal	Lindsay (NSW)	18 May 2019 – present
117	Peta Murphy	Labor	Dunkley (Vic)	18 May 2019 – 4 December 2023 (died in office)
117	Alicia Payne	Labor	Canberra (ACT)	18 May 2019 – present
117	Fiona Phillips	Labor	Gilmore (NSW)	18 May 2019 – present
117	Zali Steggall	Independent, CSA	Warringah (NSW)	18 May 2019 – present
117	Kate Thwaites	Labor	Jagajaga (Vic)	18 May 2019 – present
117	Anne Webster	National	Mallee (Vic)	18 May 2019 – present
117	**Anika Wells**	Labor	Lilley (Qld)	18 May 2019 – present
133	**Kristy McBain**	Labor	Eden-Monaro (NSW)	4 July 2020 – present
134	Michelle Ananda-Rajah	Labor	Higgins (Vic)	21 May 2022 – 28 March 2025 (switched to Senate after abolition of seat)
134	Alison Byrnes	Labor	Cunningham (NSW)	21 May 2022 – present
134	Kate Chaney	Independent	Curtin (WA)	21 May 2022 – present
134	Zoe Daniel	Independent	Goldstein (Vic)	21 May 2022 – 3 May 2025 (defeated)
134	Cassandra Fernando	Labor	Holt (Vic)	21 May 2022 – present
134	Carina Garland	Labor	Chisholm (Vic)	21 May 2022 – present
134	Tania Lawrence	Labor	Hasluck (WA)	21 May 2022 – present
134	Dai Le	Independent, DLFCN	Fowler (NSW)	21 May 2022 – present
134	Zoe McKenzie	Liberal	Flinders (Vic)	21 May 2022 – present
134	Zaneta Mascarenhas	Labor	Swan (WA)	21 May 2022 – present
134	Louise Miller-Frost	Labor	Boothby (SA)	21 May 2022 – present
134	Tracey Roberts	Labor	Pearce (WA)	21 May 2022 – present
134	Monique Ryan	Independent	Kooyong (Vic)	21 May 2022 – present
134	Sophie Scamps	Independent	Mackellar (NSW)	21 May 2022 – present
134	Marion Scrymgour	Labor	Lingiari (NT)	21 May 2022 – present
134	Sally Sitou	Labor	Reid (NSW)	21 May 2022 – present
134	Allegra Spender	Independent, CSA	Wentworth (NSW)	21 May 2022 – present
134	Kylea Tink	Independent	North Sydney (NSW)	21 May 2022 – 28 March 2025 (retired after division abolished)
134	Jenny Ware	Liberal	Hughes (NSW)	21 May 2022 – 3 May 2025 (defeated)
134	Elizabeth Watson-Brown	Greens	Ryan (Qld)	21 May 2022 – present
154	Mary Doyle	Labor	Aston (Vic)	1 April 2023 – present
155	Jodie Belyea	Labor	Dunkley (Vic)	2 March 2024 – present
156	Mary Aldred	Liberal	Monash (Vic)	3 May 2025 – present
156	Ash Ambihaipahar	Labor	Barton (NSW)	3 May 2025 – present
156	Carol Berry	Labor	Whitlam (NSW)	3 May 2025 – present
156	Nicolette Boele	Independent	Bradfield (NSW)	3 May 2025 – present
156	Jo Briskey	Labor	Maribyrnong (Vic)	3 May 2025 – present
156	Julie-Ann Campbell	Labor	Moreton (Qld)	3 May 2025 – present
156	Claire Clutterham	Labor	Sturt (SA)	3 May 2025 – present
156	Renee Coffey	Labor	Griffith (Qld)	3 May 2025 – present
156	Emma Comer	Labor	Petrie (Qld)	3 May 2025 – present
156	Kara Cook	Labor	Bonner (Qld)	3 May 2025 – present
156	Trish Cook	Labor	Bullwinkel (WA)	3 May 2025 – present
156	Ali France	Labor	Dickson (Qld)	3 May 2025 – present
156	Madonna Jarrett	Labor	Brisbane (Qld)	3 May 2025 – present
156	Alice Jordan-Baird	Labor	Gorton (Vic)	3 May 2025 – present
156	Alison Penfold	National	Lyne (NSW)	3 May 2025 – present
156	Jess Teesdale	Labor	Bass (Tas)	3 May 2025 – present
156	Anne Urquhart	Labor	Braddon (Tas)	3 May 2025 – present
156	**Rebecca White**	Labor	Lyons (Tas)	3 May 2025 – present
156	Sarah Witty	Labor	Melbourne (Vic)	3 May 2025 – present
	† Disqualified 11 September 1996 and re-elected at by-election 19 October 1996.			

== Proportion of women in the House ==
Numbers and proportions are as they were directly after the relevant election and do not take into account by-elections, defections or other changes in membership. State-based Coalition parties that caucus with one of the major parties (Liberal National Party, Country Liberal Party) have been included in the Liberals' or Nationals' totals.

Election	Labor			Liberal			National			Others			Total		
Election	Women	Total	%	Women	Total	%	Women	Total	%	Women	Total	%	Women	Total	%
1943	0	49	0.0%	1	12	8.3%	0	11	0.0%	0	2	0.0%	1	74	1.4%
1946	0	43	0.0%	1	17	5.9%	0	12	0.0%	1	2	50.0%	2	74	2.7%
1949	0	47	0.0%	1	55	1.8%	0	19	0.0%	0	0	0.0%	1	121	0.8%
1951	0	52	0.0%	0	52	0.0%	0	17	0.0%	0	0	0.0%	0	121	0.0%
1954	0	57	0.0%	0	47	0.0%	0	17	0.0%	0	0	0.0%	0	121	0.0%
1955	0	47	0.0%	0	57	0.0%	0	18	0.0%	0	0	0.0%	0	122	0.0%
1958	0	45	0.0%	0	58	0.0%	0	19	0.0%	0	0	0.0%	0	122	0.0%
1961	0	60	0.0%	0	45	0.0%	0	17	0.0%	0	0	0.0%	0	122	0.0%
1963	0	50	0.0%	0	52	0.0%	0	20	0.0%	0	0	0.0%	0	122	0.0%
1966	0	61	0.0%	1	41	2.4%	0	21	0.0%	0	1	0.0%	1	124	0.8%
1969	0	59	0.0%	0	46	0.0%	0	20	0.0%	0	0	0.0%	0	125	0.0%
1972	0	67	0.0%	0	38	0.0%	0	20	0.0%	0	0	0.0%	0	125	0.0%
1974	1	66	1.5%	0	40	0.0%	0	21	0.0%	0	0	0.0%	1	127	0.8%
1975	0	36	0.0%	0	68	0.0%	0	23	0.0%	0	0	0.0%	0	127	0.0%
1977	0	38	0.0%	0	67	0.0%	0	19	0.0%	0	0	0.0%	0	124	0.0%
1980	3	51	5.9%	0	54	0.0%	0	20	0.0%	0	0	0.0%	3	125	2.4%
1983	6	75	8.0%	0	33	0.0%	0	17	0.0%	0	0	0.0%	6	125	4.8%
1984	7	82	8.5%	1	45	2.2%	0	21	0.0%	0	0	0.0%	8	148	5.4%
1987	8	86	9.3%	1	43	2.3%	0	19	0.0%	0	0	0.0%	9	148	6.1%
1990	7	78	9.0%	3	55	5.5%	0	14	0.0%	0	1	0.0%	10	148	6.8%
1993	9	80	11.3%	4	49	8.2%	0	16	0.0%	0	2	0.0%	13	147	8.8%
1996	4	49	8.1%	17	76	22.4%	1	18	5.6%	1	5	20.0%	23	148	15.5%
1998	16	67	23.9%	15	64	23.4%	2	16	12.5%	0	1	0.0%	33	148	22.3%
2001	20	65	30.8%	16	69	23.1%	2	13	15.4%	0	3	0.0%	38	150	25.3%
2004	20	60	33.3%	15	75	20.0%	2	12	16.7%	0	3	0.0%	37	150	24.7%
2007	27	83	32.5%	12	55	21.8%	1	10	10.0%	0	2	0.0%	40	150	26.7%
2010	23	72	31.9%	13	61	21.3%	0	12	0.0%	0	5	0.0%	36	150	24.0%
2013	20	55	36.4%	16	75	21.3%	1	15	6.7%	1	5	20.0%	38	150	25.3%
2016	28	69	40.6%	12	60	20.0%	1	16	6.3%	2	5	40.0%	43	150	28.7%
2019	28	68	41.2%	13	61	21.3%	2	16	12.5%	3	6	50.0%	45	151	29.8%
2022	36	77	46.8%	9	42	21.4%	2	16	12.5%	11	16	68.8%	58	151	38.4%
2025	50	94	53.2%	6	28	21.4%	3	15	20.0%	10	13	76.9%	69	150	46.0%

== See also ==
- Women in the Australian Senate
- Women and government in Australia
- 2021 Australian Parliament rape allegations
  - 2021 March 4 Justice
