= Results of the 2016 Australian federal election in New South Wales =

2016 Australian federal election (New South Wales)
- 2 July 2016

All 47 New South Wales seats in the Australian House of Representatives and all 12 seats in the Australian Senate
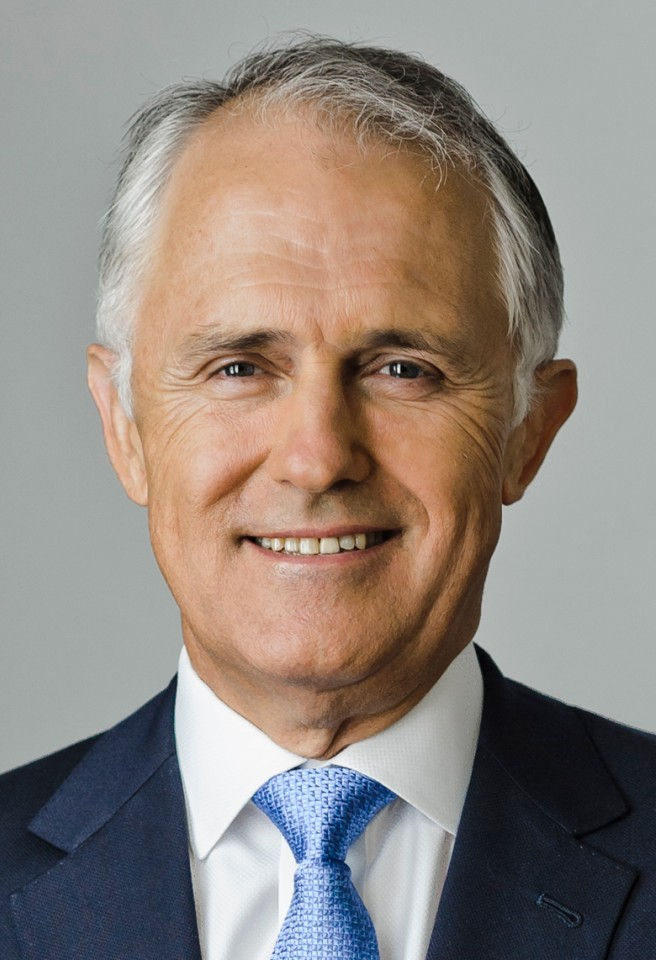

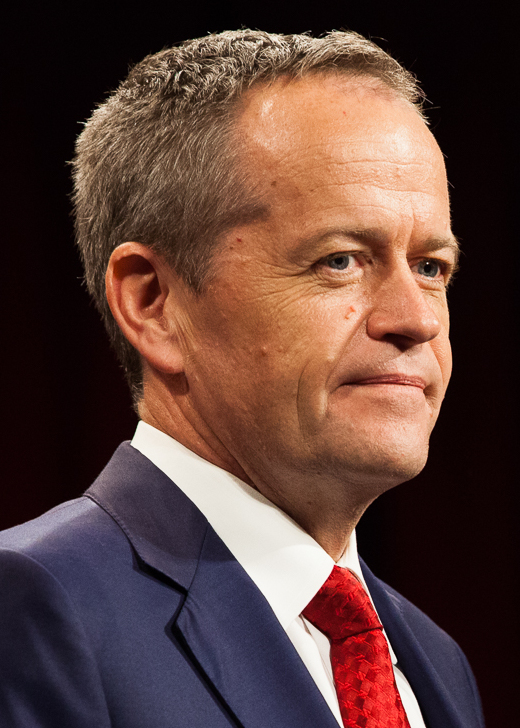
	First party	Second party
Leader	Malcolm Turnbull	Bill Shorten
Party	Liberal/National coalition	Labor
Last election	30 seats	18 seats
Seats won	23 seats	24 seats
Seat change	▼7	▲6
Popular vote	1,847,305	1,611,549
Percentage	42.32%	36.93%
Swing	▼5.02	▲2.41
TPP	50.53%	49.47%
TPP swing	▼3.82	▲3.82
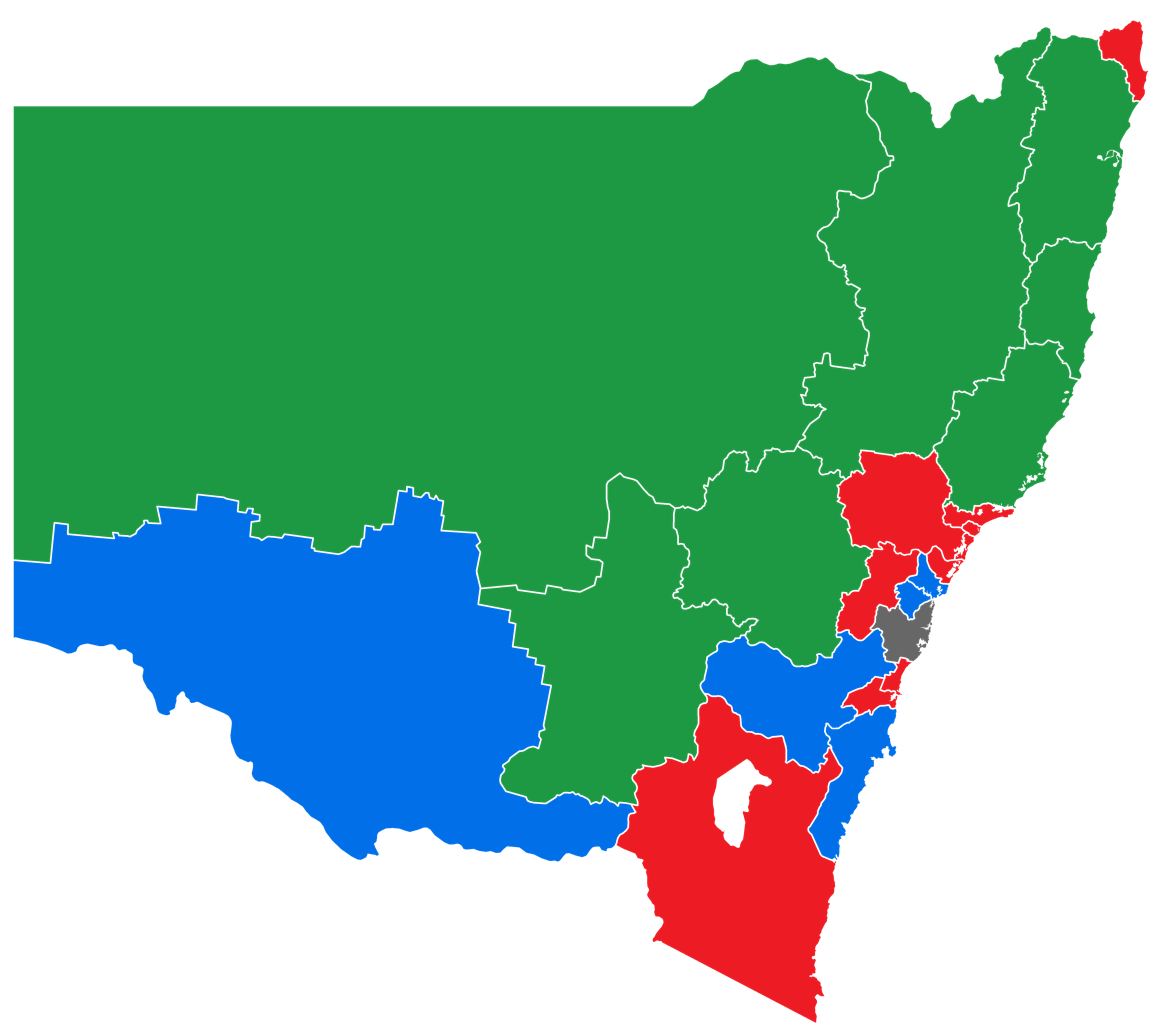
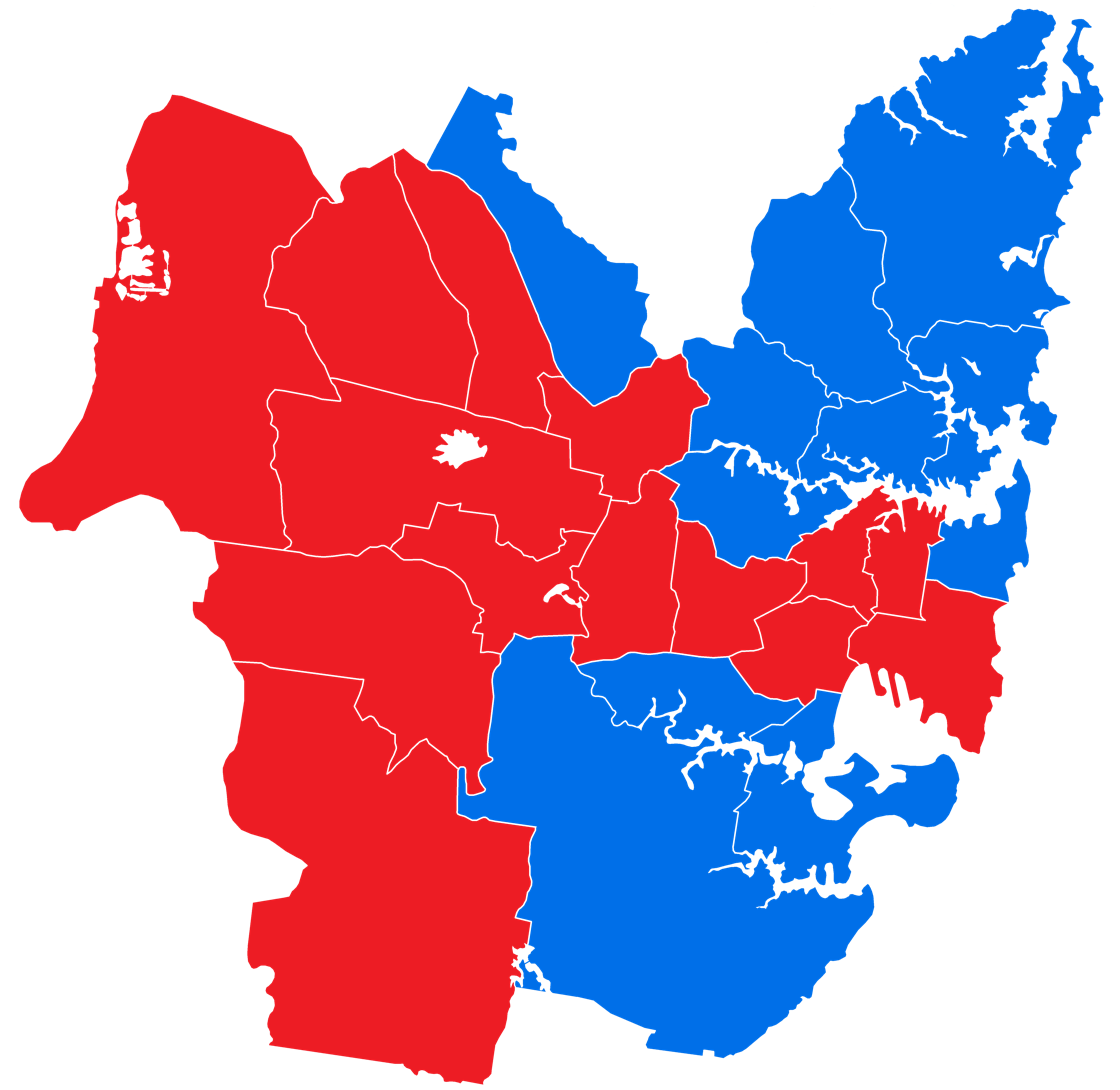

This is a list of electoral division results for the 2016 Australian federal election in the state of New South Wales.

This election was held using instant-runoff voting. In two NSW electorates, the winner did not receive the most first preference votes: Labor won the seat of Macquarie despite the Liberals having more first preference votes, and the seat of Richmond despite the Nationals having more first preference votes.

== Overall results ==
Party	Votes	%	Swing	Seats	Change
Coalition	1,847,305	42.32	–5.02	23	▼7
Liberal Party of Australia	1,426,424	32.68	–4.67	16	▼7
National Party of Australia	420,881	9.64	−0.35	7	Steady
Australian Labor Party	1,611,549	36.93	+2.41	24	▲6
Australian Greens	390,737	8.95	+1.00		
Christian Democratic Party	169,966	3.89	+1.76		
Pauline Hanson's One Nation	27,542	0.63	+0.16		
Animal Justice Party	20,695	0.47	+0.47		
Liberal Democratic Party	20,231	0.46	+0.46		
Nick Xenophon Team	16,084	0.37	+0.37		
Science Party	14,988	0.34	+0.32		
Family First Party	11,725	0.27	+0.27		
Australian Liberty Alliance	11,473	0.26	+0.26		
Online Direct Democracy	5,780	0.13	+0.13		
Drug Law Reform Australia	4,420	0.10	+0.10		
Non-Custodial Parents Party	3,663	0.08	+0.05		
Shooters, Fishers and Farmers Party	3,550	0.08	+0.08		
Derryn Hinch's Justice Party	3,150	0.07	+0.07		
The Arts Party	3,139	0.07	+0.07		
Australia First Party	2,865	0.07	−0.08		
Citizens Electoral Council	2,789	0.06	−0.04		
Australian Sex Party	2,390	0.05	−0.03		
Bullet Train for Australia	2,267	0.05	−0.15		
Mature Australia Party	1,783	0.04	+0.04		
Australian Antipaedophile Party	1,527	0.03	+0.03		
Australian Defence Veterans Party	1,448	0.03	+0.03		
Smokers' Rights Party	1,343	0.03	+0.03		
CountryMinded	1,337	0.03	+0.03		
Socialist Equality Party	1,313	0.03	+0.03		
Pirate Party	1,260	0.03	+0.03		
Rise Up Australia Party	1,007	0.02	−0.11		
Democratic Labour Party	968	0.02	−0.11		
Sustainable Australia	606	0.01	−0.04		
Renewable Energy Party	537	0.01	+0.01		
Socialist Alliance	500	0.01	–0.02		
Australian Cyclists Party	460	0.01	–0.02		
Independent	171,795	3.94	+2.21		
Non Affiliated	2,128	0.05	+0.05		
Total	4,364,320			47	▼1
Two-party-preferred vote
Liberal/National Coalition	2,205,107	50.53	−3.82	23	▼7
Australian Labor Party	2,159,213	49.47	+3.82	24	▲6
Source: AEC for both and

Liberal to Labor: Barton, Dobell, Eden-Monaro, Lindsay, Macarthur, Macquarie, Paterson

== Results by division ==
=== Banks ===
2016 Australian federal election: Banks
Party	Candidate	Votes	%	±%
Liberal	David Coleman	39,423	43.89	−3.83
Labor	Chris Gambian	35,890	39.95	+0.08
Greens	Philippa Clark	5,225	5.82	+0.77
Christian Democrats	Greg Bondar	4,777	5.32	+2.91
Family First	Sharon Wu	1,621	1.80	+1.80
Animal Justice	Roy Barnes	1,555	1.73	+1.73
Independent	Bob Spanswick	1,341	1.49	+1.49
Total formal votes		89,832	93.10	+2.19
Informal votes		6,656	6.90	−2.19
Turnout		96,488	91.99	−3.74
Two-party-preferred result
Liberal	David Coleman	46,210	51.44	−1.36
Labor	Chris Gambian	43,622	48.56	+1.36
Liberal hold		Swing	−1.36	

=== Barton ===
2016 Australian federal election: Barton
Party	Candidate	Votes	%	±%
Labor	Linda Burney	41,878	47.75	+4.14
Liberal	Nickolas Varvaris	31,038	35.39	−2.88
Greens	Brent Heber	7,741	8.83	+0.95
Christian Democrats	Sonny Susilo	3,714	4.23	+2.16
Independent	Rasmus Torkel	2,236	2.55	+2.55
Online Direct Democracy	Harry Tsoukalas	1,095	1.25	+1.25
Total formal votes		87,702	91.65	+3.56
Informal votes		7,991	8.35	−3.56
Turnout		95,693	89.84	−2.77
Two-party-preferred result
Labor	Linda Burney	51,131	58.30	+3.91
Liberal	Nickolas Varvaris	36,571	41.70	−3.91
Labor notional hold		Swing	+3.91	

=== Bennelong ===
2016 Australian federal election: Bennelong
Party	Candidate	Votes	%	±%
Liberal	John Alexander	46,497	50.41	−2.58
Labor	Lyndal Howison	26,270	28.48	−3.97
Greens	Justin Alick	8,424	9.13	+0.71
Christian Democrats	Julie Worsley	5,903	6.40	+3.99
Independent	Martin Mulcare	2,885	3.13	+3.13
Pirate	John August	1,260	1.37	+1.37
Arts	Christopher Gordon	992	1.08	+1.08
Total formal votes		92,231	94.91	+2.43
Informal votes		4,942	5.09	−2.43
Turnout		97,173	91.71	−3.39
Two-party-preferred result
Liberal	John Alexander	55,077	59.72	+1.95
Labor	Lyndal Howison	37,154	40.28	−1.95
Liberal hold		Swing	+1.95	

=== Berowra ===
2016 Australian federal election: Berowra
Party	Candidate	Votes	%	±%
Liberal	Julian Leeser	53,678	57.09	−4.39
Labor	Josh Andrews	18,693	19.88	+0.85
Greens	Emma Heyde	10,815	11.50	+1.47
Christian Democrats	Leighton Thew	5,213	5.54	+3.05
Independent	Mick Gallagher	2,859	3.04	−0.62
Science	Brendan Clarke	1,933	2.06	+2.06
Independent	Roger Woodward	826	0.88	+0.88
Total formal votes		94,017	95.84	+1.44
Informal votes		4,082	4.16	−1.44
Turnout		98,099	93.21	−3.83
Two-party-preferred result
Liberal	Julian Leeser	62,470	66.45	−2.60
Labor	Josh Andrews	31,547	33.55	+2.60
Liberal hold		Swing	−2.60	

=== Blaxland ===
2016 Australian federal election: Blaxland
Party	Candidate	Votes	%	±%
Labor	Jason Clare	50,572	63.31	+8.07
Liberal	Felicity Findlay	19,825	24.82	−8.49
Christian Democrats	Clint Nasr	4,810	6.02	+3.91
Greens	Suzan Virago	3,698	4.63	+1.34
Socialist Equality	Gabriela Zabala	980	1.23	+1.23
Total formal votes		79,885	88.45	+1.81
Informal votes		10,429	11.55	−1.81
Turnout		90,314	87.25	−3.20
Two-party-preferred result
Labor	Jason Clare	55,507	69.48	+8.24
Liberal	Felicity Findlay	24,378	30.52	−8.24
Labor hold		Swing	+8.24	

=== Bradfield ===
2016 Australian federal election: Bradfield
Party	Candidate	Votes	%	±%
Liberal	Paul Fletcher	57,231	61.12	−3.96
Labor	Katie Gompertz	15,926	17.01	+0.42
Greens	Adrian Jones	10,936	11.68	−1.15
Independent	Christine Berman	4,248	4.54	+4.54
Christian Democrats	Chris Vale	3,497	3.73	+1.91
Liberty Alliance	Peter Kelly	1,796	1.92	+1.92
Total formal votes		93,634	96.45	+2.16
Informal votes		3,446	3.55	−2.16
Turnout		97,080	91.88	−3.41
Two-party-preferred result
Liberal	Paul Fletcher	66,513	71.04	+0.10
Labor	Katie Gompertz	27,121	28.96	−0.10
Liberal hold		Swing	+0.10	

=== Calare ===
2016 Australian federal election: Calare
Party	Candidate	Votes	%	±%
National	Andrew Gee	47,717	47.58	−9.03
Labor	Jess Jennings	27,132	27.06	+0.76
Greens	Delanie Sky	7,238	7.22	+2.16
Liberal Democrats	Glen Davis	6,557	6.54	+6.54
Xenophon	Rod Bloomfield	5,412	5.40	+5.40
Independent	Anthony Craig	3,836	3.83	+3.83
Christian Democrats	Bernie Gesling	2,386	2.38	+0.52
Total formal votes		100,278	94.81	+0.94
Informal votes		5,490	5.19	−0.94
Turnout		105,768	93.64	−1.76
Two-party-preferred result
National	Andrew Gee	61,978	61.81	−3.16
Labor	Jess Jennings	38,300	38.19	+3.16
National hold		Swing	−3.16	

=== Chifley ===
2016 Australian federal election: Chifley
Party	Candidate	Votes	%	±%
Labor	Ed Husic	52,278	61.09	+8.39
Liberal	Mohit Kumar	19,394	22.66	−9.16
Christian Democrats	Joshua Green	7,820	9.14	+5.68
Greens	Eliza James	3,883	4.54	+1.88
Independent	Ammar Khan	2,194	2.56	+0.44
Total formal votes		85,569	91.66	+4.95
Informal votes		7,785	8.34	−4.95
Turnout		93,354	89.88	+0.16
Two-party-preferred result
Labor	Ed Husic	59,202	69.19	+8.26
Liberal	Mohit Kumar	26,367	30.81	−8.26
Labor hold		Swing	+8.26	

=== Cook ===
2016 Australian federal election: Cook
Party	Candidate	Votes	%	±%
Liberal	Scott Morrison	53,321	58.35	−1.41
Labor	David Atkins	24,283	26.57	+0.44
Greens	Nathan Hunt	6,198	6.78	+0.89
Christian Democrats	George Capsis	4,430	4.85	+2.87
Independent	John Brett	3,153	3.45	+3.45
Total formal votes		91,385	94.83	+1.95
Informal votes		4,983	5.17	−0.75
Turnout		96,368	92.36	−2.58
Two-party-preferred result
Liberal	Scott Morrison	59,760	65.39	−0.32
Labor	David Atkins	31,625	34.61	+0.32
Liberal hold		Swing	−0.32	

=== Cowper ===
2016 Australian federal election: Cowper
Party	Candidate	Votes	%	±%
National	Luke Hartsuyker	47,559	45.97	−8.10
Independent	Rob Oakeshott	27,200	26.29	+26.29
Labor	Damian Wood	14,079	13.61	−9.97
Greens	Carol Vernon	6,901	6.67	−3.89
Christian Democrats	Wayne Lawrence	3,538	3.42	+0.95
Independent	John Arkan	3,457	3.34	+3.34
Citizens Electoral Council	Michael Gough	726	0.70	+0.70
Total formal votes		103,460	94.85	+0.37
Informal votes		5,613	5.15	−0.37
Turnout		109,073	92.23	−0.78
Notional two-party-preferred count
National	Luke Hartsuyker	64,743	62.58	−0.65
Labor	Damian Wood	38,717	37.42	+0.65
Two-candidate-preferred result
National	Luke Hartsuyker	56,443	54.56	−13.15
Independent	Rob Oakeshott	47,017	45.44	+45.44
National hold		Swing	N/A	

=== Cunningham ===
2016 Australian federal election: Cunningham
Party	Candidate	Votes	%	±%
Labor	Sharon Bird	46,414	47.89	+0.89
Liberal	Michelle Blicavs	28,263	29.16	−2.81
Greens	Cath Blakey	14,200	14.65	+3.30
Christian Democrats	Michelle Ryan	3,939	4.06	+1.74
Science	Nathan Waters	2,526	2.61	+2.61
Non-Custodial Parents	John Flanagan	1,582	1.63	+0.67
Total formal votes		96,924	95.16	+2.20
Informal votes		4,933	4.84	−2.20
Turnout		101,857	91.51	−1.68
Two-party-preferred result
Labor	Sharon Bird	61,377	63.32	+2.03
Liberal	Michelle Blicavs	35,547	36.68	−2.03
Labor hold		Swing	+2.03	

=== Dobell ===
2016 Australian federal election: Dobell
Party	Candidate	Votes	%	±%
Labor	Emma McBride	41,454	42.88	+6.48
Liberal	Karen McNamara	36,586	37.84	−2.97
One Nation	Carter Edwards	8,326	8.61	+8.61
Greens	Abigail Boyd	5,607	5.80	+0.91
Christian Democrats	Hadden Ervin	2,549	2.64	+1.21
Independent	Gregory Stephenson	1,176	1.22	+1.22
Independent	Paul Baker	976	1.01	+1.01
Total formal votes		96,674	94.20	+1.68
Informal votes		5,956	5.80	−1.68
Turnout		102,630	91.94	−1.09
Two-party-preferred result
Labor	Emma McBride	52,991	54.81	+4.63
Liberal	Karen McNamara	43,683	45.19	−4.63
Labor notional hold		Swing	+4.63	

=== Eden-Monaro ===
2016 Australian federal election: Eden-Monaro
Party	Candidate	Votes	%	±%
Labor	Mike Kelly	39,565	41.88	+5.93
Liberal	Peter Hendy	39,049	41.34	+0.07
Greens	Tamara Ryan	7,177	7.60	+0.15
Animal Justice	Frankie Seymour	1,986	2.10	+2.10
Christian Democrats	Ursula Bennett	1,763	1.87	+0.85
Independent	Daniel Grosmaire	1,683	1.78	+1.78
Defence Veterans	Don Friend	1,448	1.53	+1.53
Independent	Andrew Thaler	981	1.04	−0.05
Independent	Ray Buckley	817	0.86	+0.86
Total formal votes		94,469	93.66	−0.81
Informal votes		6,399	6.34	+0.81
Turnout		100,868	93.55	−2.58
Two-party-preferred result
Labor	Mike Kelly	50,003	52.93	+5.84
Liberal	Peter Hendy	44,466	47.07	−5.84
Labor gain from Liberal		Swing	+5.84	

=== Farrer ===
2016 Australian federal election: Farrer
Party	Candidate	Votes	%	±%
Liberal	Sussan Ley	55,893	57.87	+13.85
Labor	Christian Kunde (disendorsed)	17,486	18.11	−2.07
Greens	Amanda Cohn	7,936	8.22	+4.28
Liberty Alliance	Ron Pike	5,874	6.08	+6.08
Independent	Brian Mills	4,133	4.28	+4.28
Christian Democrats	Paul Rossetto	3,474	3.60	+2.41
Mature Australia	Trevor O'Brien	1,783	1.85	+1.85
Total formal votes		96,579	93.60	+0.21
Informal votes		6,602	6.40	−0.21
Turnout		103,181	92.63	−3.81
Two-party-preferred result
Liberal	Sussan Ley	68,114	70.53	−1.18
Labor	Christian Kunde	28,465	29.47	+1.18
Liberal hold		Swing	−1.18	

=== Fowler ===
2016 Australian federal election: Fowler
Party	Candidate	Votes	%	±%
Labor	Chris Hayes	51,559	60.82	+3.80
Liberal	Adam Farhan	21,812	25.73	−5.77
Greens	Bill Cashman	5,264	6.21	+2.86
Christian Democrats	Craig Hall	4,792	5.65	+1.86
Smokers Rights	Joaquim de Lima	1,343	1.58	+1.58
Total formal votes		84,770	89.59	+3.14
Informal votes		9,850	10.41	−3.14
Turnout		94,620	89.73	−3.01
Two-party-preferred result
Labor	Chris Hayes	57,209	67.49	+4.60
Liberal	Adam Farhan	27,561	32.51	−4.60
Labor hold		Swing	+4.60	

=== Gilmore ===
2016 Australian federal election: Gilmore
Party	Candidate	Votes	%	±%
Liberal	Ann Sudmalis	46,713	45.28	−2.15
Labor	Fiona Phillips	40,476	39.23	+4.97
Greens	Carmel McCallum	10,820	10.49	+1.43
Christian Democrats	Steve Ryan	5,160	5.00	+2.16
Total formal votes		103,169	95.87	+1.08
Informal votes		4,442	4.13	−1.08
Turnout		107,611	92.87	−0.27
Two-party-preferred result
Liberal	Ann Sudmalis	52,336	50.73	−3.05
Labor	Fiona Phillips	50,833	49.27	+3.05
Liberal hold		Swing	−3.05	

=== Grayndler ===
2016 Australian federal election: Grayndler
Party	Candidate	Votes	%	±%
Labor	Anthony Albanese	40,503	46.07	−0.40
Liberal	David Van Gogh	20,498	23.31	−3.13
Greens	Jim Casey	19,555	22.24	+0.17
Animal Justice	Emma Hurst	1,831	2.08	+2.08
Science	Meow-Ludo Meow-Meow	1,157	1.32	+1.32
Christian Democrats	Jamie Elvy	1,085	1.23	−0.43
Drug Law Reform	Chris Hindi	1,029	1.17	+1.17
Sex Party	Pat Sheil	934	1.06	+1.06
Renewable Energy	Chris McLachlan	537	0.61	+0.61
Cyclists	Noel McFarlane	460	0.52	+0.52
Socialist Equality	Oscar Grenfell	333	0.38	+0.38
Total formal votes		87,922	93.27	−0.48
Informal votes		6,343	6.73	+0.48
Turnout		94,265	89.28	−2.37
Notional two-party-preferred count
Labor	Anthony Albanese	63,616	72.36	+3.60
Liberal	David Van Gogh	24,306	27.64	−3.60
Two-candidate-preferred result
Labor	Anthony Albanese	57,872	65.82	−4.52
Greens	Jim Casey	30,050	34.18	+34.18
Labor hold		Swing	N/A	

=== Greenway ===
2016 Australian federal election: Greenway
Party	Candidate	Votes	%	±%
Labor	Michelle Rowland	43,722	49.08	+4.60
Liberal	Yvonne Keane	30,657	34.41	−5.55
Christian Democrats	Aaron Wright	4,484	5.03	+1.27
Greens	Chris Winslow	3,351	3.76	+0.11
Liberal Democrats	Timothy Mak	2,923	3.28	+3.28
Independent	Avtar Singh Billu	1,749	1.96	+1.96
Family First	Rohan Salins	1,273	1.43	+1.43
Science	Vivek Singha	924	1.04	+1.04
Total formal votes		89,083	92.44	+2.42
Informal votes		7,282	7.56	−2.42
Turnout		96,365	92.32	−0.26
Two-party-preferred result
Labor	Michelle Rowland	50,163	56.31	+3.33
Liberal	Yvonne Keane	38,920	43.69	−3.33
Labor hold		Swing	+3.33	

=== Hughes ===
2016 Australian federal election: Hughes
Party	Candidate	Votes	%	±%
Liberal	Craig Kelly	48,734	51.97	−3.59
Labor	Diedree Steinwall	29,895	31.88	+2.21
Greens	Phil Smith	6,912	7.37	+1.50
Christian Democrats	Michael Caudre	4,490	4.79	+2.00
Animal Justice	Ellie Robertson	3,745	3.99	+3.99
Total formal votes		93,776	95.60	+1.88
Informal votes		4,314	4.40	−1.88
Turnout		98,090	93.94	−2.45
Two-party-preferred result
Liberal	Craig Kelly	55,633	59.33	−2.48
Labor	Diedree Steinwall	38,143	40.67	+2.48
Liberal hold		Swing	−2.48	

=== Hume ===
2016 Australian federal election: Hume
Party	Candidate	Votes	%	±%
Liberal	Angus Taylor	51,103	53.83	−2.45
Labor	Aoife Champion-Fashoyin	30,221	31.84	+6.37
Greens	Michaela Sherwood	6,274	6.61	+0.98
Christian Democrats	Adrian Van der Byl	3,533	3.72	+1.86
Bullet Train	Trevor Anthoney	2,267	2.39	+2.39
Citizens Electoral Council	Lindsay Cosgrove	1,530	1.61	+0.73
Total formal votes		94,928	94.70	+1.42
Informal votes		5,311	5.30	−1.42
Turnout		100,239	93.57	+1.46
Two-party-preferred result
Liberal	Angus Taylor	57,127	60.18	−3.40
Labor	Aoife Champion-Fashoyin	37,801	39.82	+3.40
Liberal hold		Swing	−3.40	

=== Hunter ===
2016 Australian federal election: Hunter
Party	Candidate	Votes	%	±%
Labor	Joel Fitzgibbon	49,962	51.79	+7.08
National	Ruth Rogers	25,409	26.34	+9.65
Greens	Peter Morris	6,842	7.09	+1.00
Independent	John Harvey	4,740	4.91	+4.91
Christian Democrats	Richard Stretton	3,260	3.38	+0.79
Independent	Cordelia Troy	3,216	3.33	+3.33
Independent	John Warham	1,934	2.00	+2.00
Independent	Arjay Martin	1,103	1.14	+1.14
Total formal votes		96,466	92.12	−1.26
Informal votes		8,249	7.88	+1.26
Turnout		104,715	92.33	−0.47
Two-party-preferred result
Labor	Joel Fitzgibbon	60,255	62.46	+6.78
National	Ruth Rogers	36,211	37.54	−6.78
Labor hold		Swing	+6.78	

=== Kingsford Smith ===
2016 Australian federal election: Kingsford Smith
Party	Candidate	Votes	%	±%
Labor	Matt Thistlethwaite	43,642	47.37	+5.35
Liberal	Michael Feneley	34,591	37.54	−5.96
Greens	James Macdonald	9,698	10.53	+0.74
Christian Democrats	Andrew Weatherstone	2,144	2.33	+0.73
Science	Andrea Leong	2,059	2.23	+1.43
Total formal votes		92,134	95.00	+3.63
Informal votes		4,849	5.00	−3.63
Turnout		96,983	89.24	−2.53
Two-party-preferred result
Labor	Matt Thistlethwaite	53,962	58.57	+5.83
Liberal	Michael Feneley	38,172	41.43	−5.83
Labor hold		Swing	+5.83	

=== Lindsay ===
2016 Australian federal election: Lindsay
Party	Candidate	Votes	%	±%
Labor	Emma Husar	36,675	41.08	+2.05
Liberal	Fiona Scott	35,081	39.30	−7.35
Greens	Kingsley Liu	3,199	3.58	+0.52
Christian Democrats	Warren Wormald	2,701	3.03	+0.24
	Marcus Cornish	2,128	2.38	+2.38
Liberty Alliance	Stephen Roddick	2,110	2.36	+2.36
Xenophon	Stephen Lynch	1,850	2.07	+2.07
Family First	Linda La Brooy	1,513	1.69	+1.69
Justice	Scott Grimley	1,497	1.68	+1.68
Animal Justice	Deborah Blundell	1,454	1.63	+1.63
Australia First	Jim Saleam	1,068	1.20	+0.50
Total formal votes		89,276	88.23	−3.56
Informal votes		11,913	11.77	+3.56
Turnout		101,189	92.22	−2.07
Two-party-preferred result
Labor	Emma Husar	45,633	51.11	+4.10
Liberal	Fiona Scott	43,643	48.89	−4.10
Labor gain from Liberal		Swing	+4.10	

=== Lyne ===
2016 Australian federal election: Lyne
Party	Candidate	Votes	%	±%
National	David Gillespie	49,399	49.57	+19.40
Labor	Peter Alley	26,470	26.56	+2.59
Greens	Julie Lyford	9,406	9.44	+3.10
Independent	Brad Christensen	9,227	9.26	+9.26
Christian Democrats	Elaine Carter	3,026	3.04	+0.83
Independent	Rodger John Riach	2,126	2.13	+2.13
Total formal votes		99,654	95.41	+1.11
Informal votes		4,797	4.59	−1.11
Turnout		104,451	93.44	−1.17
Two-party-preferred result
National	David Gillespie	61,416	61.63	−1.89
Labor	Peter Alley	38,238	38.37	+1.89
National hold		Swing	−1.89	

=== Macarthur ===
2016 Australian federal election: Macarthur
Party	Candidate	Votes	%	±%
Labor	Mike Freelander	46,650	51.88	+13.68
Liberal	Russell Matheson	32,235	35.85	−9.81
Christian Democrats	James Gent	3,875	4.31	+1.20
Greens	Ben Moroney	3,836	4.27	+0.10
Xenophon	Richard Bakoss	3,316	3.69	+3.69
Total formal votes		89,912	93.38	+2.95
Informal votes		6,379	6.62	−2.95
Turnout		96,291	91.83	+2.23
Two-party-preferred result
Labor	Mike Freelander	52,448	58.33	+11.72
Liberal	Russell Matheson	37,464	41.67	−11.72
Labor gain from Liberal		Swing	+11.72	

=== Mackellar ===
2016 Australian federal election: Mackellar
Party	Candidate	Votes	%	±%
Liberal	Jason Falinski	48,103	51.17	−11.26
Labor	Rhonda Funnell	16,286	17.32	+0.08
Greens	Mike Hall	13,204	14.05	−0.14
Independent	Jim Ball	6,797	7.23	+7.23
Independent	Julie Hegarty	4,542	4.83	+4.83
Independent	Liam Gavin	2,669	2.84	+2.84
Christian Democrats	Annie Wright	2,411	2.56	+0.58
Total formal votes		94,012	94.74	+0.49
Informal votes		5,223	5.26	−0.49
Turnout		99,235	91.66	−1.94
Two-party-preferred result
Liberal	Jason Falinski	61,800	65.74	−3.10
Labor	Rhonda Funnell	32,212	34.26	+3.10
Liberal hold		Swing	−3.10	

=== Macquarie ===
2016 Australian federal election: Macquarie
Party	Candidate	Votes	%	±%
Liberal	Louise Markus	34,946	38.21	−9.15
Labor	Susan Templeman	32,480	35.52	+4.52
Greens	Terry Morgan	10,257	11.22	+0.12
Christian Democrats	Catherine Lincoln	3,567	3.90	+0.88
Shooters, Fishers, Farmers	Jake Grizelj	3,550	3.88	+3.88
Animal Justice	Hal Jon Ginges	2,554	2.79	+2.79
Liberty Alliance	Carl Halley	1,693	1.85	+1.85
Justice	Liz Cooper	1,653	1.81	+1.81
Liberal Democrats	Olya Shornikov	752	0.82	+0.82
Total formal votes		91,452	93.47	−0.90
Informal votes		6,389	6.53	+0.90
Turnout		97,841	93.38	−2.65
Two-party-preferred result
Labor	Susan Templeman	47,733	52.19	+6.67
Liberal	Louise Markus	43,719	47.81	−6.67
Labor gain from Liberal		Swing	+6.67	

=== McMahon ===
2016 Australian federal election: McMahon
Party	Candidate	Votes	%	±%
Labor	Chris Bowen	45,979	53.44	+4.40
Liberal	George Bilic	25,855	30.05	−10.69
Christian Democrats	Milan Maksimovic	6,198	7.20	+4.43
Greens	Astrid O'Neill	4,665	5.42	+2.43
Australia First	Victor Waterson	1,797	2.09	+2.08
Independent	Fadhel Shamasha	1,544	1.79	+1.79
Total formal votes		86,038	90.11	+2.09
Informal votes		9,441	9.89	−2.09
Turnout		95,479	89.94	−3.72
Two-party-preferred result
Labor	Chris Bowen	53,442	62.11	+7.48
Liberal	George Bilic	32,596	37.89	−7.48
Labor hold		Swing	+7.48	

=== Mitchell ===
2016 Australian federal election: Mitchell
Party	Candidate	Votes	%	±%
Liberal	Alex Hawke	55,168	60.49	−4.33
Labor	Andrew Punch	22,440	24.61	+3.53
Greens	Michael Bellstedt	7,287	7.99	+1.58
Christian Democrats	Darryl Allen	6,303	6.91	+3.70
Total formal votes		91,198	95.49	+1.90
Informal votes		4,308	4.51	−1.90
Turnout		95,506	93.26	−1.50
Two-party-preferred result
Liberal	Alex Hawke	61,847	67.82	−3.57
Labor	Andrew Punch	29,351	32.18	+3.57
Liberal hold		Swing	−3.57	

=== New England ===
2016 Australian federal election: New England
Party	Candidate	Votes	%	±%
National	Barnaby Joyce	49,673	52.29	−1.42
Independent	Tony Windsor	27,763	29.22	+29.22
Labor	David Ewings	6,662	7.01	−6.79
Greens	Mercurius Goldstein	2,775	2.92	−1.85
Independent	Rob Taber	2,661	2.80	−9.77
CountryMinded	David Mailler	1,337	1.41	+1.41
Christian Democrats	Stan Colefax	1,317	1.39	−0.27
Liberal Democrats	Peter Whelan	1,151	1.21	+1.21
Independent	Philip Cox	856	0.90	+0.90
Online Direct Democracy	Robert Walker	809	0.85	+0.85
Total formal votes		95,004	92.96	−1.03
Informal votes		7,196	7.04	+1.03
Turnout		102,200	93.37	−3.12
Notional two-party-preferred count
National	Barnaby Joyce	63,100	66.42	−3.12
Labor	David Ewings	31,904	33.58	+3.12
Two-candidate-preferred result
National	Barnaby Joyce	55,595	58.52	−5.94
Independent	Tony Windsor	39,409	41.48	+41.48
National hold		Swing	N/A	

=== Newcastle ===
2016 Australian federal election: Newcastle
Party	Candidate	Votes	%	±%
Labor	Sharon Claydon	46,762	47.12	+2.83
Liberal	David Compton	29,689	29.92	−3.26
Greens	John Mackenzie	13,558	13.66	+2.06
Drug Law Reform	Karen Burge	3,391	3.42	+3.42
Independent	Rod Holding	2,735	2.76	+2.17
Christian Democrats	Milton Caine	2,132	2.15	+0.43
Democratic Labour	Stuart Southwell	968	0.98	+0.98
Total formal votes		99,235	95.26	+1.56
Informal votes		4,939	4.74	−1.56
Turnout		104,174	91.92	−2.35
Two-party-preferred result
Labor	Sharon Claydon	63,348	63.84	+4.44
Liberal	David Compton	35,887	36.16	−4.44
Labor hold		Swing	+4.44	

=== North Sydney ===
2016 Australian federal election: North Sydney
Party	Candidate	Votes	%	±%
Liberal	Trent Zimmerman	47,614	51.49	−9.42
Labor	Peter Hayes	15,537	16.80	−3.22
Greens	Arthur Chesterfield-Evans	12,036	13.02	−2.50
Independent	Stephen Ruff	11,829	12.79	+12.79
Christian Democrats	Sharon Martin	1,894	2.05	+1.08
Science	James Coffey	1,629	1.76	+1.76
Liberal Democrats	Daniel Leahy	1,289	1.39	+1.39
Family First	Eddy Ku	649	0.70	+0.70
Total formal votes		92,477	95.24	+0.59
Informal votes		4,623	4.76	−0.59
Turnout		97,100	90.71	−1.54
Two-party-preferred result
Liberal	Trent Zimmerman	58,825	63.61	−2.10
Labor	Peter Hayes	33,652	36.39	+2.10
Liberal hold		Swing	−2.10	

=== Page ===
2016 Australian federal election: Page
Party	Candidate	Votes	%	±%
National	Kevin Hogan	46,327	44.28	−2.15
Labor	Janelle Saffin	36,471	34.86	−1.03
Greens	Kudra Falla-Ricketts	11,649	11.14	+2.09
Liberal Democrats	Mark Ellis	4,199	4.01	+4.01
Animal Justice	Anna Ludvik	2,984	2.85	+2.85
Christian Democrats	Bethany McAlpine	2,982	2.85	+0.98
Total formal votes		104,612	96.16	+1.02
Informal votes		4,181	3.84	−1.02
Turnout		108,793	92.78	−1.21
Two-party-preferred result
National	Kevin Hogan	54,717	52.30	−0.80
Labor	Janelle Saffin	49,895	47.70	+0.80
National hold		Swing	−0.80	

=== Parkes ===
2016 Australian federal election: Parkes
Party	Candidate	Votes	%	±%
National	Mark Coulton	54,869	58.65	+2.89
Labor	Kate Stewart	26,728	28.57	+6.08
Greens	Matt Parmeter	5,851	6.25	+1.52
Christian Democrats	Glen Ryan	3,950	4.22	+1.90
Online Direct Democracy	Philip Ayton	2,149	2.30	+2.30
Total formal votes		93,547	94.76	+1.31
Informal votes		5,170	5.24	−1.31
Turnout		98,717	91.95	−3.29
Two-party-preferred result
National	Mark Coulton	60,901	65.10	−4.87
Labor	Kate Stewart	32,646	34.90	+4.87
National hold		Swing	−4.87	

=== Parramatta ===
2016 Australian federal election: Parramatta
Party	Candidate	Votes	%	±%
Labor	Julie Owens	38,109	46.46	+4.31
Liberal	Michael Beckwith	28,194	34.37	−9.15
Greens	Phil Bradley	5,640	6.88	+1.67
Christian Democrats	Keith Piper	4,347	5.30	+2.83
Independent	Mahesh Raj	2,048	2.50	+2.50
Liberal Democrats	Mark Guest	2,013	2.45	+2.45
Family First	Mikaela Wu	1,202	1.47	+1.47
Online Direct Democracy	Andrew Driessen	469	0.57	+0.57
Total formal votes		82,022	90.74	+1.19
Informal votes		8,367	9.26	−1.19
Turnout		90,389	89.02	−3.55
Two-party-preferred result
Labor	Julie Owens	47,300	57.67	+6.35
Liberal	Michael Beckwith	34,722	42.33	−6.35
Labor hold		Swing	+6.35	

=== Paterson ===
2016 Australian federal election: Paterson
Party	Candidate	Votes	%	±%
Labor	Meryl Swanson	46,090	46.06	+6.22
Liberal	Karen Howard	31,527	31.51	+0.62
One Nation	Graham Burston	13,056	13.05	+11.62
Greens	John Brown	5,797	5.79	−0.56
Christian Democrats	Peter Arena	2,058	2.06	−0.09
Rise Up Australia	Brian Clare	1,007	1.01	+0.45
Citizens Electoral Council	Peter Davis	533	0.53	−0.12
Total formal votes		100,068	95.11	+1.31
Informal votes		5,143	4.89	−1.31
Turnout		105,211	93.49	+0.37
Two-party-preferred result
Labor	Meryl Swanson	60,779	60.74	+10.47
Liberal	Karen Howard	39,289	39.26	−10.47
Labor notional hold		Swing	+10.47	

=== Reid ===
2016 Australian federal election: Reid
Party	Candidate	Votes	%	±%
Liberal	Craig Laundy	44,212	48.80	−0.62
Labor	Angelo Tsirekas	32,918	36.33	−1.31
Greens	Alice Mantel	7,673	8.47	+0.75
Christian Democrats	Ju Kang	3,713	4.10	+2.49
Family First	Marylou Carter	2,081	2.30	+2.30
Total formal votes		90,597	95.02	+3.67
Informal votes		4,748	4.98	−3.67
Turnout		95,345	90.41	−0.80
Two-party-preferred result
Liberal	Craig Laundy	49,543	54.69	+1.36
Labor	Angelo Tsirekas	41,054	45.31	−1.36
Liberal hold		Swing	+1.36	

=== Richmond ===
2016 Australian federal election: Richmond
Party	Candidate	Votes	%	±%
National	Matthew Fraser	37,006	37.61	−1.80
Labor	Justine Elliot	30,551	31.05	−3.33
Greens	Dawn Walker	20,108	20.44	+5.07
One Nation	Neil Smith	6,160	6.26	+6.11
Animal Justice	Angela Pollard	3,089	3.14	+3.14
Christian Democrats	Russell Kilarney	1,484	1.51	+0.10
Total formal votes		98,398	96.33	+1.25
Informal votes		3,748	3.67	−1.25
Turnout		102,146	90.54	−0.80
Two-party-preferred result
Labor	Justine Elliot	53,092	53.96	+2.38
National	Matthew Fraser	45,306	46.04	−2.38
Labor hold		Swing	+2.38	

=== Riverina ===
2016 Australian federal election: Riverina
Party	Candidate	Votes	%	±%
National	Michael McCormack	56,581	57.20	+15.43
Labor	Tim Kurylowicz	25,244	25.52	+3.75
Independent	Richard Foley	6,058	6.12	+6.12
Greens	Kevin Poynter	4,444	4.49	+0.83
Family First	Glenn O'Rourke	3,386	3.42	+3.42
Christian Democrats	Philip Langfield	3,207	3.24	+1.52
Total formal votes		98,920	95.39	+1.78
Informal votes		4,784	4.61	−1.78
Turnout		103,704	93.41	−3.15
Two-party-preferred result
National	Michael McCormack	65,719	66.44	−2.55
Labor	Tim Kurylowicz	33,201	33.56	+2.55
National hold		Swing	−2.55	

=== Robertson ===
2016 Australian federal election: Robertson
Party	Candidate	Votes	%	±%
Liberal	Lucy Wicks	42,573	44.68	+1.15
Labor	Anne Charlton	36,611	38.43	+3.74
Greens	Hillary Morris	7,954	8.35	+2.75
Independent	Van Davy	2,726	2.86	+2.86
Christian Democrats	Robert Stoddart	2,539	2.66	+1.40
Antipaedophile	Lawrie Higgins	1,527	1.60	+1.60
Liberal Democrats	Matthew Craig	1,347	1.41	+1.41
Total formal votes		95,277	94.97	+0.90
Informal votes		5,042	5.03	−0.90
Turnout		100,319	92.52	−1.81
Two-party-preferred result
Liberal	Lucy Wicks	48,728	51.14	−1.95
Labor	Anne Charlton	46,549	48.86	+1.95
Liberal hold		Swing	−1.95	

=== Shortland ===
2016 Australian federal election: Shortland
Party	Candidate	Votes	%	±%
Labor	Pat Conroy	50,164	51.17	+3.00
Liberal	Jenny Barrie	34,514	35.20	−1.30
Greens	Ivan Macfadyen	9,279	9.46	+3.14
Christian Democrats	Morgan Cox	4,081	4.16	+2.59
Total formal votes		98,038	95.29	+1.58
Informal votes		4,845	4.71	−1.58
Turnout		102,883	93.45	−2.73
Two-party-preferred result
Labor	Pat Conroy	58,761	59.94	+2.54
Liberal	Jenny Barrie	39,277	40.06	−2.54
Labor hold		Swing	+2.54	

=== Sydney ===
2016 Australian federal election: Sydney
Party	Candidate	Votes	%	±%
Labor	Tanya Plibersek	38,449	43.74	+0.13
Liberal	Geoffrey Winters	25,622	29.15	−2.98
Greens	Sylvie Ellsmore	16,537	18.81	+0.46
Animal Justice	Mark Berriman	1,497	1.70	+1.70
Christian Democrats	Ula Falanga	1,489	1.69	+0.83
Sex Party	Rebecca Lanning	1,456	1.66	+1.66
Science	Tom Geiser	1,361	1.55	+1.55
Sustainable Australia	Kris Spike	606	0.69	+0.69
Socialist Alliance	Peter Boyle	500	0.57	−0.06
Online Direct Democracy	Tula Tzoras	383	0.44	+0.44
Total formal votes		87,900	94.01	+0.43
Informal votes		5,603	5.99	−0.43
Turnout		93,503	84.77	+0.05
Two-party-preferred result
Labor	Tanya Plibersek	57,410	65.31	+2.44
Liberal	Geoffrey Winters	30,490	34.69	−2.44
Labor hold		Swing	+2.44	

=== Warringah ===
2016 Australian federal election: Warringah
Party	Candidate	Votes	%	±%
Liberal	Tony Abbott	44,759	51.65	−9.19
Labor	Andrew Woodward	12,820	14.79	−4.54
Greens	Clara Williams Roldan	10,565	12.19	−3.33
Independent	James Mathison	9,887	11.41	+11.41
Xenophon	Marie Rowland	5,506	6.35	+6.35
Christian Democrats	June Scifo	1,039	1.20	+0.49
Science	Marc Giordano	800	0.92	+0.92
Arts	Shea Caplice	669	0.77	+0.77
Independent	Tony Backhouse	368	0.42	+0.42
Independent	David Barrow	253	0.29	+0.29
Total formal votes		86,666	93.92	−0.68
Informal votes		5,611	6.08	+0.68
Turnout		92,277	89.90	−2.16
Notional two-party-preferred count
Liberal	Tony Abbott	52,948	61.09	−4.23
Labor	Andrew Woodward	33,718	38.91	+4.23
Two-candidate-preferred result
Liberal	Tony Abbott	53,346	61.55	−3.80
Greens	Clara Williams Roldan	33,320	38.45	+38.45
Liberal hold		Swing	N/A	

=== Watson ===
2016 Australian federal election: Watson
Party	Candidate	Votes	%	±%
Labor	Tony Burke	46,105	55.39	+4.84
Liberal	Mohammad Zaman	21,133	25.39	−11.22
Christian Democrats	Violet Abdulla	7,957	9.56	+7.19
Greens	Barbara Bloch	5,555	6.67	+0.40
Science	Tom Gordon	1,611	1.94	+1.94
Online Direct Democracy	Paul Geran	875	1.05	+1.05
Total formal votes		83,236	89.35	+3.24
Informal votes		9,924	10.65	−3.24
Turnout		93,160	88.37	−3.05
Two-party-preferred result
Labor	Tony Burke	56,247	67.58	+8.76
Liberal	Mohammad Zaman	26,989	32.42	−8.76
Labor hold		Swing	+8.76	

=== Wentworth ===
2016 Australian federal election: Wentworth
Party	Candidate	Votes	%	±%
Liberal	Malcolm Turnbull	52,353	62.26	−2.35
Labor	Evan Hughes	14,913	17.73	−0.98
Greens	Dejay Toborek	12,496	14.86	+0.84
Arts	Anthony Ackroyd	1,478	1.76	+1.76
Science	Peter Xing	988	1.17	+1.17
Christian Democrats	Beresford Thomas	901	1.07	+0.62
Independent	David Allen	573	0.68	+0.68
Independent	Marc Aussie-Stone	390	0.46	+0.46
Total formal votes		84,092	94.87	+0.60
Informal votes		4,549	5.13	−0.60
Turnout		88,641	86.24	−3.76
Two-party-preferred result
Liberal	Malcolm Turnbull	56,971	67.75	−1.17
Labor	Evan Hughes	27,121	32.25	+1.17
Liberal hold		Swing	−1.17	

=== Werriwa ===
2016 Australian federal election: Werriwa
Party	Candidate	Votes	%	±%
Labor	Anne Stanley	46,596	52.14	+2.81
Liberal	Ned Mannoun	32,670	36.56	+0.51
Christian Democrats	Daniel Edwards	5,986	6.70	+2.49
Greens	Signe Westerberg	4,109	4.60	+1.36
Total formal votes		89,361	91.24	+4.88
Informal votes		8,581	8.76	−4.88
Turnout		97,942	90.22	+1.77
Two-party-preferred result
Labor	Anne Stanley	52,005	58.20	+1.67
Liberal	Ned Mannoun	37,356	41.80	−1.67
Labor hold		Swing	+1.67	

=== Whitlam ===
2016 Australian federal election: Whitlam
Party	Candidate	Votes	%	±%
Labor	Stephen Jones	51,939	52.76	+8.36
Liberal	Marcus Hewitt	25,870	26.28	−3.36
Greens	Tom Hunt	8,162	8.29	+2.50
National	Jan Mandelson	6,341	6.44	−2.43
Christian Democrats	Susan Pinsuti	4,048	4.11	+1.55
Non-Custodial Parents	Wayne Hartman	2,081	2.11	+1.66
Total formal votes		98,441	94.59	+2.60
Informal votes		5,628	5.41	−2.60
Turnout		104,069	92.88	−0.10
Two-party-preferred result
Labor	Stephen Jones	62,730	63.72	+6.81
Liberal	Marcus Hewitt	35,711	36.28	−6.81
Labor hold		Swing	+6.81	
