= Husar =

Husar or HUSAR may refer to:

- Húsar, a village at the Faroe Islands
- Heavy Urban Search and Rescue, a type of response to disaster situations in a city
- Husar-rover, an experimental planetary rover design, built in Hungary as part of the Hunveyor project

== People with the surname ==
- Emma Husar (born 1980), Australian politician
- Lubomyr Husar (1933–2017), Ukrainian Catholic archbishop and cardinal
- Martin Husár (born 1985), Slovak football player
- Natalka Husar (born 1951), Canadian painter

== See also ==
- Husárová, Slovak feminine form of Husár
- Hussar
