= Hunveyor =

Experimental space probe model

The Hunveyor-1.

The Hunveyor is an experimental space probe model constructed in the Hungarian universities. Its name is coming from the following words: HUNVEYOR = Hungarian UNiversity surVEYOR. Recently 10 university or college space research groups and high school groups build Hunveyor (or the Husar-rover) developed later to work around Hunveyor in Hungary.

== Design and construction ==
The clear construction and the well recognizable instrumentation of the NASA Surveyors (which were built in the Surveyor program and which landed on the Moon between 1966 and 1968) have given the possibility to construct an educational version of the space probe. In 1997, the teachers and students of the Eötvös Loránd University, Budapest, Department of General Technology examined the literature published on Surveyor missions and a group led by Szaniszlo Berczi constructed the Hunveyor-1 with robotic arm and TV camera (similar to Surveyor 3) with some other simple measurements on board.

Construction of a Surveyor-type planetary lander is one of the space science education programs on Eotvos University, Budapest, Hungary. It focuses on both planetary science and technologies. The new initiative of experimental space probe model construction uses interactions between measuring instruments and environmental streams. Similar is the case between artificially planned technologies and environmental currents (water, wind flows, other transport mechanisms). All these activities are involved in the construction and continuous development of a training and experimental space probe model.

Students played an important role in the construction of this Hunveyor probe. The first training space probe lander, Hunveyor-1, was initiated at the Eotvos University, Department of General Technology, in October 1997. It had two previous ideas helping to start the Hunveyor program. First: the space science education program by activities (i.e. by construction) was the essential program in NASA International United States Space Camp, Huntsville, Alabama, USA. There, every year, NASA Marshall Space Flight Center organizes an International Space Camp where all participant countries delegate two students (high-school age) and their accompanying teacher. The strength and value of the in situ experiments in space science education were experienced by several Hungarian teachers and students during the last 10 years. Second: the program had been helped by Eugene Shoemaker who sent to Szaniszlo Berczi scientific materials about the Surveyor program in the late 1960s.

In 1998 the program was continued on other universities and colleges in Hungary: in Pecs University, Dept. of Informatics and General Technology (Sandor Hegyi, head) where the Hunveyor-2 has been built, then in 2000 on the Berzsenyi College, Dept. of Technology (Zsolt Kovacs, head) and in 2001 in the Kandó Kálmán College in Szekesfehervar (Gyorgy Hudoba, head) where the Hunveyor-3 and Hunveyor-4 has been built, respectively. In 2003 this program of Hunveyor construction has been extended in the high schools, too. In Pannonhalma, at the Saint Benedict Pannonhalma Archabbey's Gymnasium (Ambrus Pinter, head) the Hunveyor-7 is in construction. Three other high schools in Hungary also participate in the project of building the space probe model.

The Hunveyor program is: construction of a planetary lander model, the experimental part, from the very beginning of the work. Important goal is: measuring the interactions between instruments (technologies) and environmental currents (water, wind flows, other transport mechanisms). Planning, construction, carrying out testing activities, and also the continuous development of the training space probe model are also important parts of the program with the Surveyor type Hunveyor.

Students played important role in the construction of this Hunveyor probe which shows that the training space probe lander model Hunveyor is an intensive experimental tool for education. It concentrates and focuses efforts

- how to teach technologies and
- how to teach planetary science,
- how to connect disciplinary knowledge.

It involves theoretical education and practice in construction and technologies.

The first level of this work was a minimal space probe model for experiments, while the first unit was a tetrahedral skeleton (Surveyor-like) as a holding frame. For a minimal probe the personal minimal environmental observations and activities in a new environment were copied: visuality, touch, temperature experience. Television camera with mirror to "see around", telescopic arm to dig small graben, and a bimetallic temperature-measuring instrument can be corresponded to them. Passive magnets were also fixed on the legs.

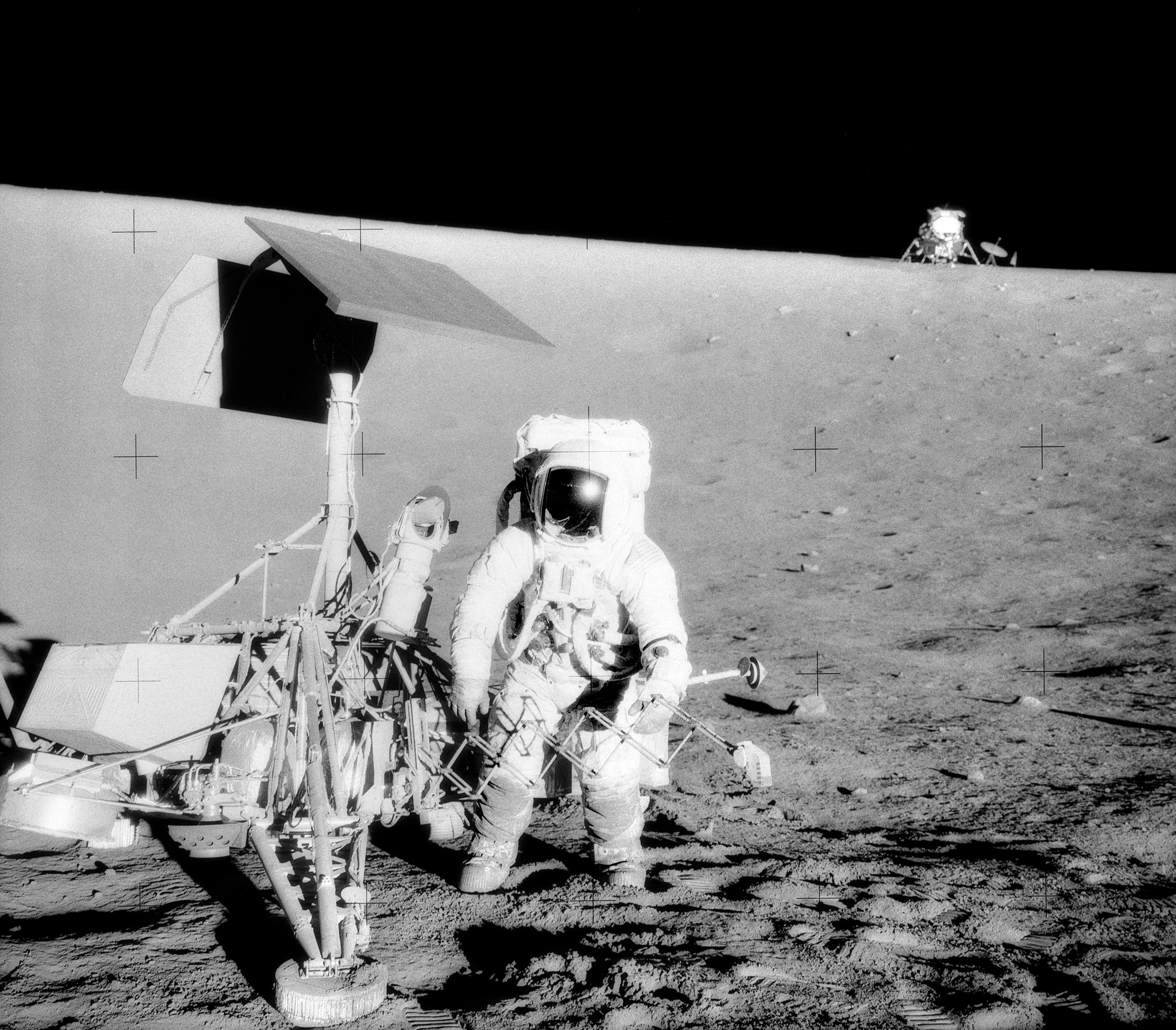
The Apollo-12 astronaut visits the Surveyor-3 space probe on the Moon.

== Electronics of the Hunveyor System ==
Also the first level contains the electronics of the Hunveyor System. Essentially, two computers are talking with each other. One is the "Terrestrial Direction and Control" computer, the other is the "Computer on Board of the Space Probe Model". Their connection can be gradually "liberated". First by cables later separated radio electronic connection was built. This Surveyor-like minimal probe gave us many pleasure during building. The skeleton was made from copper pipes with 15 mm diameter. The robotics are constructed by microcontrollers. They can operate both motors and measuring units. Solar panels, the web cameras and other units were purchased in the shops. Computers are PCs. Husar-rovers gave new impetus to the program later.

Basic points of the Hunveyor constructing works are as follows:

1. Hierarchy levels in the operating mechatronic system
2. Modul principle (modularity) in the robotic system
3. Compatible subsystems in construction
4. PC based electronics
5. Group-works by students, teachers.

== Educational books, field tests, supports from HSO, reports in LPSC ==
Material on Hunveyor has been published in Hungarian in the form of various lecture note series booklets, while a Surveyor-Hunveyor concise atlas has been published in English.

Field tests and various Hunveyor Husar planetary analog field trips and simulations are the next steps in using Hunveyor in planetary science education. Mathematica demonstrations (a computer program of the Wolfram Research) help planning and studying motions, extensions, and other operations with the new instruments.

The Hunveyor experimental and training space probe model construction works were also helped by the Hungarian Space Office (HSO). Developments were reported in the NASA Lunar and Planetary Science Conferences.

== Hunveyor Teams ==
The work is continuously tutored by the Materials Physics, Institute of Physics, Eötvös Loránd University and the Hungarian Space Office also supports the Hunveyor groups. Recent works are at: Hunveyor-1, ELTE, Budapest; Hunveyor-2, PTE, Pécs; Hunveyor-3, BDTF, Szombathely; Hunveyor-4, BMF, Székesfehérvár; Hunveyor-5, NYME, Sopron; Hunveyor-6, High School, Dorog; Hunveyor-7, High School, Pannonhalma; Hunveyor-8, GAMF College, Kecskemét; Hunveyor-9, High School, Tata; Hunveyor-10, Eötvös University, Faculty of Informatics ELTE, Budapest. Hunveyor-11, Szt. Margit High School, Budapest, Hunveyor-12, Magyarkanizsa School, Magyarkanizsa, Serbia, Hunveyor-13, Varga et Fellow Co., Budapest, Hunveyor-14, Hunballon, Pápa, Hunveyor-15, Puli Space Technologies, Budapest.
