= Husárová =

Husárová (Slovak pronunciation: [ˈɦusaːrɔʋa]) is a Slovak surname. It is the feminine form of Husár. Notable people with the surname include:

- Janette Husárová (born 1974), Slovak tennis player
- Veronika Husárová (born 1987), Slovak beauty queen

== See also ==
- Husar (disambiguation)
