= Ross Free =

Australian politician (born 1943)

The Honourable Ross Free

Member of the Australian Parliament for Macquarie
- In office 18 October 1980 – 1 December 1984
- Preceded by: Reg Gillard
- Succeeded by: Alasdair Webster

Member of the Australian Parliament for Lindsay
- In office 1 December 1984 – 2 March 1996
- Preceded by: New seat
- Succeeded by: Jackie Kelly

Personal details
- Born: 7 March 1943 (age 83) Bathurst, New South Wales
- Party: Australian Labor Party
- Children: Stephen Free
- Education: University of Sydney
- Occupation: Politician, Teacher

Ross Vincent Free (born 7 March 1943) is a former Australian politician who served as a Labor member of the Australian House of Representatives representing the seat of Macquarie from 1980 until 1984, then Lindsay from 1984 until 1996. He served as a minister from 1980 until 1996 in both the Hawke and Keating ministries.

== Biography ==
Free was born in Bathurst, New South Wales, and completed a Bachelor of Science (Honours) and Graduate Diploma of Education at the University of Sydney, following which he worked as a school teacher.

Free won Labor preselection for the outer Sydney federal seat of Macquarie ahead of the 1980 election, and defeated the incumbent Liberal member Reg Gillard. He served as a member of several house standing parliamentary committees, in opposition and then in government upon Hawke winning the prime ministership in 1983. When a redistribution ahead of the 1984 election erased most of his majority in Macquarie, he transferred to the newly created seat of Lindsay, based around Penrith. In 1985 he led a delegation to the European Parliamentary Institutions in Strasbourg and Berlin, and again in Germany in 1986.

After the 1990 election, at which Hawke won a fourth term, Free was appointed Parliamentary Secretary to the Prime Minister in the Fourth Hawke Ministry.

Following Paul Keating's first, and unsuccessful, challenge for the leadership in June 1991, a number of changes were made to the ministry, with Free being promoted to Minister for Science and Technology and Minister Assisting the Prime Minister on Science. Hawke was ultimately defeated in a second challenge on 20 December 1991, and Free continued in the First Keating Ministry in the same portfolios. After the 1993 election, he served in the Second Keating Ministry as Minister for Schools, Vocational Education and Training.

He was one of several ministers to lose his seat at the 1996 election, at which John Howard became prime minister. Free went into the election sitting on a seemingly daunting margin of 10.2 percent, but lost Lindsay to Liberal candidate Jackie Kelly on a swing of almost 12 percent—one of 13 Labor MPs from New South Wales to lose his seat. Kelly was subsequently found to have run while still a serving RAAF officer, and Kelly (originally from New Zealand) still had New Zealand citizenship; both subsequently contested the resulting by-election (as did 10 other candidates), but Free lost by a greater margin.

== Publications ==
- Free, Ross (1992). Developing Australian ideas : a blueprint for the 1990s. Australian Government Publishing Service. ISBN 0-644-25523-4. (White Paper, 52 pages)
- Free, Ross (15 October 1992). Government response to "Genetic manipulation: the threat or the glory?": Ministerial statement. (Statement in response to Standing Committee report, 4 pages)

Political offices
Preceded by Simon Crean	Minister for Science and Technology; 1991–93	Succeeded by Chris Schacht
Parliament of Australia
Preceded by Reg Gillard	Member for Macquarie; 1980–84	Succeeded by Alasdair Webster
New division	Member for Lindsay; 1984–96	Succeeded by Jackie Kelly
