= Melissa McIntosh =

Australian politician (born 1977)

Melissa McIntosh MP
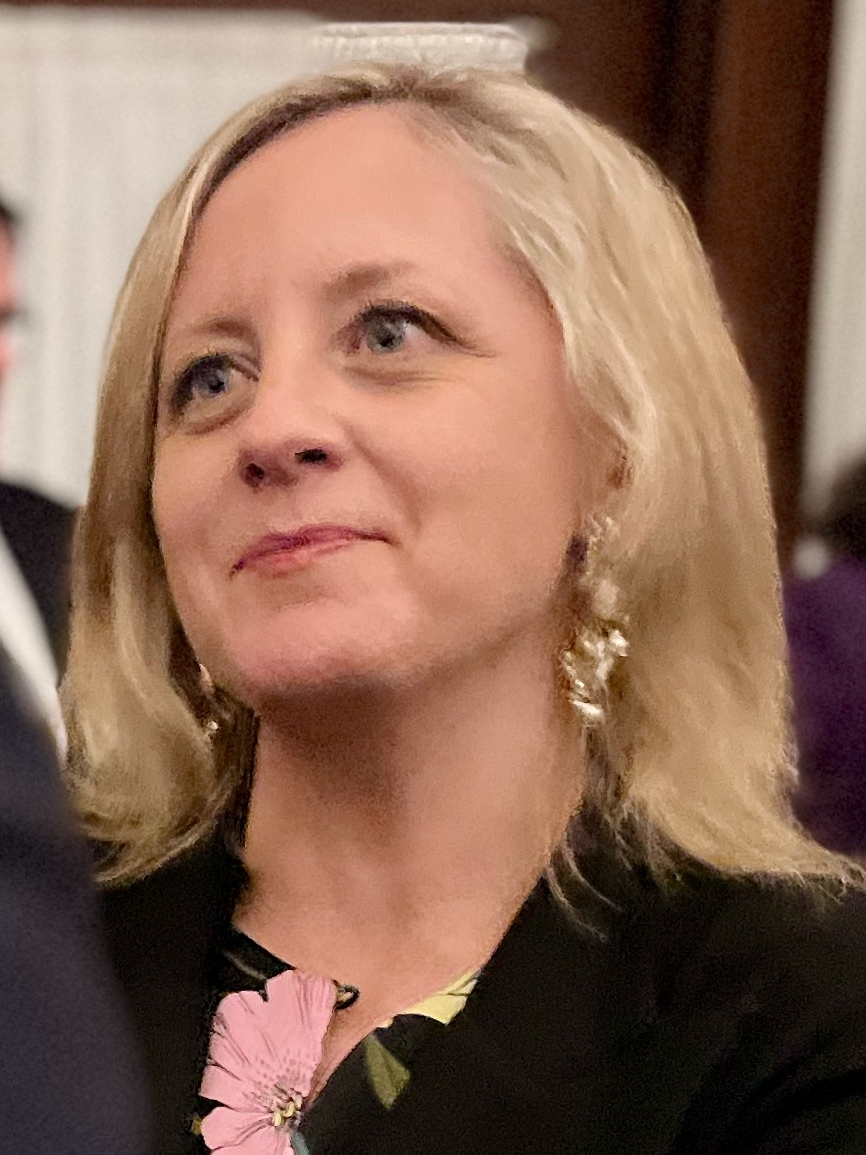
- McIntosh in 2024

Shadow Minister for Families and Social Services
- Incumbent
- Assumed office 17 February 2026
- Leader: Angus Taylor
- Preceded by: Kerrynne Liddle

Shadow Minister for the National Disability Insurance Scheme
- Incumbent
- Assumed office 17 February 2026
- Leader: Angus Taylor
- Preceded by: Anne Ruston (as Shadow Minister for Disability and the National Disability Insurance Scheme)

Shadow Minister for Women
- Incumbent
- Assumed office 28 May 2025
- Leader: Sussan Ley; Angus Taylor
- Preceded by: Sussan Ley
Previous shadow ministerial offices
Shadow Minister for Communications
In office 25 January 2025 – 17 February 2026
Leader	Peter Dutton; Sussan Ley
Preceded by	David Coleman
Succeeded by	Sarah Henderson (as Shadow Minister for Communications and Digital Safety)
Shadow Minister for Western Sydney
In office 5 March 2024 – 28 May 2025
Leader	Peter Dutton; Sussan Ley
Preceded by	Position established
Succeeded by	Position abolished
Shadow Minister for Energy Affordability
In office 5 March 2024 – 25 January 2025
Leader	Peter Dutton
Preceded by	Position established
Succeeded by	Ted O'Brien (as Shadow Minister for Energy Affordability and Reliability)
Shadow Assistant Minister for Mental Health and Suicide
In office 5 June 2022 – 5 March 2024
Leader	Peter Dutton
Shadow Minister	Anne Ruston
Preceded by	Emma McBride (as Shadow Assistant Minister for Mental Health)
Succeeded by	Hollie Hughes

Member of the Australian Parliament for Lindsay
- Incumbent
- Assumed office 18 May 2019
- Preceded by: Emma Husar

Personal details
- Born: Melissa Iris Grah; 24 August 1977 (age 49) Penrith, New South Wales, Australia
- Party: Liberal
- Spouse: Stuart McIntosh
- Education: Western Sydney University
- Occupation: Political staffer Communications officer
- Website: https://melissamcintosh.com.au

Melissa Iris McIntosh (née Grah; born 24 August 1977) is an Australian politician. She is a member of the Liberal Party and was elected to the House of Representatives at the 2019 federal election, running in the New South Wales seat of Lindsay.

== Early life ==
McIntosh was born on 24 August 1977 in Penrith, New South Wales. Her father Edmund Grah immigrated to Australia in the late 1950s from Graz, Austria. His parents and sister had been killed in World War II.

McIntosh attended Blaxland High School but experienced bullying at the school, particularly around her performing arts and dance talent. She later switched to the Newtown High School of the Performing Arts. She then studied journalism, public relations and video production at the University of Western Sydney, graduating with the degree of Bachelor of Communications.

== Career ==
McIntosh began working in politics after graduating university, working as an aide to arts and sport minister Jackie Kelly and later in the office of Prime Minister John Howard. From 2011 to 2015, she worked at the United States Studies Centre at the University of Sydney as head of partnerships and director of events. She then served as chief of staff to Assistant Treasurer Alex Hawke until 2016, when she joined Wentworth Community Housing as executive manager (communications).

Prior to her election to parliament, McIntosh was a vice-president of the Liberal Party of Australia (New South Wales Division) and a member of the state executive. She was an unsuccessful candidate for the Fourth Ward of the Blue Mountains City Council in 2016.

McIntosh is a member of the centre-right faction of the Liberal Party.

=== Member of Parliament ===
In November 2018, McIntosh won Liberal preselection for the Division of Lindsay. Lindsay, centred on Penrith in western Sydney, has always been considered a key marginal seat. She was elected to the House of Representatives at the 2019 federal election, defeating Australian Labor Party (ALP) candidate Diane Beamer, who had defeated the incumbent ALP member Emma Husar for preselection.

She was re-elected in 2022, with a swing towards her of +1.30% and 2025, where she faced a swing against her towards the Labor Party of -3.33%. In both elections, she survived heavy swings against the Liberals in metropolitan seats. In 2022, she was one of only six Liberals holding a Sydney-based seat; in 2025 she was one of only three.

McIntosh was appointed as the Shadow Minister for Energy Affordability; Shadow Minister for Communications; and Shadow Minister for Western Sydney during the Dutton shadow ministry.

Following the 2025 federal election, McIntosh retained her portfolio as the Shadow Minister for Communications, and also became the Shadow Minister of Women in the Ley shadow ministry.

McIntosh is a self-described 'aspirant' for the leadership of the Liberal Party.

=== Senior Leadership and Shadow Cabinet (2026) ===
In February 2026, under the new leadership of Angus Taylor, McIntosh was promoted to expanded roles within this senior leadership team. Her current portfolios include Shadow Minister for Families and Social Services, Shadow Minister for the National Disability Insurance Scheme (NDIS), and Shadow Minister for Women.

== Personal life ==
McIntosh has three children with her husband Stuart McIntosh, a former Olympic canoeist. They met at the 2000 Summer Olympics in Sydney. He works for the New South Wales Government Department of Planning. She has sometimes used the name "Melissa Grah-McIntosh".

McIntosh lives in Mount Riverview in New South Wales.

Parliament of Australia
Preceded by Emma Husar	Member for Lindsay; 2019–present	Incumbent
