= David Bradbury (politician) =

Australian politician (born 1976)

The Honourable David Bradbury

Member of the Australian Parliament for Lindsay
- In office 24 November 2007 – 7 September 2013
- Preceded by: Jackie Kelly
- Succeeded by: Fiona Scott

Assistant Treasurer
- In office 27 February 2012 – 18 September 2013
- Prime Minister: Julia Gillard; Kevin Rudd
- Preceded by: Mark Arbib
- Succeeded by: Arthur Sinodinos

Minister Assisting for Deregulation
- In office 27 February 2012 – 18 September 2013
- Prime Minister: Julia Gillard, Kevin Rudd
- Preceded by: New portfolio
- Succeeded by: Mathias Cormann as Minister for Finance

Minister for Competition Policy and Consumer Affairs
- In office 1 July 2013 – 18 September 2013
- Prime Minister: Kevin Rudd
- Preceded by: vacant
- Succeeded by: Mathias Cormann as Minister for Finance

Minister Assisting for Financial Services and Superannuation
- In office 1 July 2013 – 18 September 2013
- Prime Minister: Kevin Rudd
- Preceded by: Bill Shorten
- Succeeded by: Mathias Cormann as Minister for Finance

Personal details
- Born: 28 February 1976 (age 50) Sydney
- Party: Australian Labor Party
- Spouse: Kylie Bradbury
- Children: Anna, Helena, Rose and Nicholas
- Education: University of Sydney
- Profession: Lawyer; Politician; Global Public Policy; Executive Leadership

David John Bradbury (born 28 February 1976 in Sydney) is an Australian former politician. He was a Labor member of the Australian House of Representatives, representing the Division of Lindsay, in New South Wales, from 2007 until 2013. Bradbury was the Minister for Competition Policy and Consumer Affairs, Assistant Treasurer, Minister Assisting for Financial Services and Superannuation, and Minister Assisting for Deregulation. He is currently the Head of Tax Policy and Statistics at the Organisation for Economic Co-operation and Development's Centre For Tax Policy and Administration.

== Early life and education ==
Bradbury was born and raised in Fairfield in Western Sydney. He was educated at Patrician Brothers' College, Fairfield, where he was elected College Captain in 1993.

Bradbury studied at the University of Sydney where he graduated with a Bachelor of Arts and Bachelor of Laws with Honours. He subsequently completed postgraduate studies in taxation law, also at the University of Sydney.

== Career ==
=== Pre-political career ===
Before entering Parliament, Bradbury was admitted as a solicitor of the Supreme Court of New South Wales in 2002. Bradbury was a Senior Associate specialising in taxation law with the corporate law firm Blake Dawson, where he worked as a lawyer from 2002 to 2007.

=== Political career ===
==== Before entering Parliament ====
Bradbury joined the Australian Labor Party in 1994 and quickly became active in the youth wing of the NSW Branch of the party. In 1998, he was elected President of New South Wales Young Labor.

In 1999, Bradbury was elected as a councillor to the East Ward of Penrith City Council. He served as a councillor until 2008, which included two terms as Mayor of the Penrith City. When Bradbury was elected Mayor of Penrith in his first term, at the age of 24 years, he was the youngest person to hold that office in the city's history..

Bradbury ran for the marginal seat of Lindsay in Sydney's west at the 2001 and 2004 federal elections, where he was unsuccessful.

==== Election as the Member for Lindsay ====
Bradbury was elected to the seat of Lindsay in the Australian House of Representatives at the 2007 election as part of Kevin Rudd's incoming Labor Government. He served as chair of the Caucus Economics Committee, as well as a member of the House Economics and House Communications committees and the Joint Public Accounts Committee.

Bradbury was re-elected to the seat of Lindsay in the 2010 election in a close electoral contest that he narrowly won by 1,865 votes. The result in Lindsay played an important role in helping Julia Gillard form minority government in the weeks after the 2010 election.

==== Ministerial Office ====
On 14 September 2010, Bradbury was sworn in as Parliamentary Secretary to the Treasurer in the Second Gillard Ministry. As Parliamentary Secretary, Bradbury had responsibility for Competition Policy and Consumer Affairs, Corporate Governance, including Executive Remuneration policy, and Financial Literacy.

On 5 March 2012, Bradbury was elevated to the role of Assistant Treasurer, and Minister Assisting for Deregulation in a cabinet reshuffle following 2012 Labor party leadership spill a week earlier and the resignation of previous Assistant Treasurer Mark Arbib. As Assistant Treasurer, Bradbury retained responsibility for Competition Policy and Consumer Affairs and assumed responsibility in areas such as Taxation Policy, Foreign Investment Policy and the Not-for-Profit sector.

On 1 July 2013, following the return of Kevin Rudd to the Prime Ministership, Bradbury was sworn in as Assistant Treasurer, Minister for Competition Policy and Consumer Affairs, Minister Assisting for Deregulation and Minister Assisting for Financial Services and Superannuation.

As part of his ministerial responsibilities in the Rudd and Gillard Governments, Bradbury served on the Expenditure Review Committee of Cabinet and had administrative oversight for a number of the nation's key economic regulators, including the Australian Competition and Consumer Commission (ACCC), the Australian Securities and Investments Commission (ASIC), the Australian Taxation Office (ATO), the Productivity Commission, the Foreign Investment Review Board (FIRB) and the Australian Charities and Not-for-Profits Commission (ACNC).

==== Corporate and Multinational Tax Avoidance ====
During his time as Assistant Treasurer, Bradbury was at the forefront of the Labor Government's efforts to crack down on corporate and multinational tax avoidance. In November 2012 , he outlined a number of concerns about base erosion and profit shifting (BEPS) by multinationals, especially the large digital firms. He declared that the government would implement a range of measures to address these concerns. As part of these efforts, Bradbury led a number of ground-breaking initiatives, which included:

- a major revision of Australia's General Anti-Avoidance Rules,
- the modernisation of Australia's transfer pricing laws,
- the announcement of a wide-ranging BEPS package of corporate tax reforms, which included tightening Australia's thin capitalisation rules,
- the introduction of new laws requiring greater tax transparency by requiring the publication of details by the Commissioner of Taxation of tax paid by large multinationals.

==== Defeat at the 2013 Election ====
In 2013, the Rudd Labor Government was defeated by the incoming Abbott Liberal-National Government. Bradbury was defeated at the 2013 election by Fiona Scott, whom he had defeated in 2010.

=== Post-politics ===
In April 2014 Bradbury took up a position heading the Tax Policy and Statistics Division within the Organisation for Economic Co-operation and Development's Centre For Tax Policy and Administration. In this role, Bradbury has been leading a team of economists, lawyers and statisticians who provide country-specific and general tax policy advice, carry out economic analysis, and produce internationally comparable tax data and analysis .

At the OECD, Bradbury was a key contributor to the delivery of the OECD/G20 Base Erosion and Profit Shifting (BEPS) Project and its implementation.

He has also led the OECD's involvement with the Task Force on the Digital Economy and led the team responsible for delivering the interim report on the Tax Challenges Arising from Digitalisation to the G20 Finance Ministers and Leaders.

In 2018, Bradbury was ranked No.1 in the International Tax Review's Global Tax 50 list of the most influential people in global tax policy .

== Personal life ==
Bradbury and his wife Kylie have four children. He and his family lived in Paris, France. Until 2024 when they moved back to Australia Sydney.

== See also ==
- Second Gillard Ministry
- Second Rudd Ministry
- Organisation for Economic Co-operation and Development

Civic offices
Preceded by John Bateman	Mayor of Penrith; 2000–2001	Succeeded by Pat Sheehy
Preceded by Greg Davies	Mayor of Penrith; 2004	Succeeded by Jackie Greenow
Parliament of Australia
Preceded by Jackie Kelly	Member for Lindsay; 2007–2013	Succeeded by Fiona Scott
Political offices
Preceded by Mark Arbib	Assistant Treasurer; 2012–2013	Succeeded by Arthur Sinodinos
Preceded by New portfolio	Minister Assisting for Deregulation; 2012–2013	Succeeded by Mathias Cormann as Minister for Finance
Preceded by vacant	Minister for Competition Policy and Consumer Affairs; 2013	Succeeded by Mathias Cormann as Minister for Finance
Preceded by Bill Shorten	Minister Assisting for Financial Services and Superannuation; 2013	Succeeded by Mathias Cormann as Minister for Finance
