= 1996 Lindsay by-election =

- 19 October 1996

	First party	Second party
Candidate	Jackie Kelly	Ross Free
Party	Liberal	Labor
Popular vote	34,840	23,758
Percentage	49.21%	33.56%
Swing	▲6.69pp	▼3.76pp
TPP	56.55%	43.45%
TPP swing	▲4.97pp	▼4.97pp
MP before election
Jackie Kelly
Liberal
Elected MP
Jackie Kelly
Liberal

The 1996 Lindsay by-election was held in the Australian electorate of Lindsay in New South Wales on 19 October 1996. The by-election was triggered by a ruling of the Court of Disputed Returns that the election of the Liberal Party candidate Jackie Kelly was invalid, due to her citizenship status and employment by the Royal Australian Air Force. The writ for the by-election was issued on 16 September 1996.

== Background ==
Jackie Kelly won the seat of Lindsay from Labor's Ross Free at the 1996 federal election – a surprise win as Lindsay was considered a safe Labor seat. However, Kelly's election was challenged on two counts: that she had not renounced her New Zealand citizenship (Section 44 of the Australian Constitution states that "a subject or citizen of a foreign power" is ineligible to stand for federal parliament), and that at the time of her nomination as a candidate she was employed as a legal officer for the Royal Australian Air Force (s. 44 also prohibits any person who "holds any office of profit under the Crown" from election to parliament). The Court of Disputed Returns ruled on 11 September 1996 that Kelly's election was indeed constitutionally invalid, and a by-election was called several days later. Kelly, by this time, had resigned from the RAAF and renounced her New Zealand citizenship, and was eligible to stand as a candidate in the by-election.

== Results ==
Lindsay by-election, 1996
Party	Candidate	Votes	%	±%
Liberal	Jackie Kelly	34,840	49.21	+6.69
Labor	Ross Free	23,758	33.56	−6.76
AAFI	Vince Townsend	4,224	5.97	+3.24
Shooters	Rodney Franich	2,042	2.88	+2.88
Greens	Lesley Edwards	1,502	2.12	−2.29
Call to Australia	Brian Grigg	1,254	1.77	−0.39
Democrats	Stephen Lear	1,182	1.67	−4.92
Independent	Kay Anne Vella	933	1.32	+1.32
Independent	Vicki Aird	488	0.69	+0.69
Independent	Steve Grim-Reaper	270	0.38	+0.38
Independent	Robert Frank Peacey	156	0.22	+0.22
Family Law Reform	David Archibald	150	0.21	+0.21
Total formal votes		70,799	96.36	−0.06
Informal votes		2,678	3.64	+0.06
Turnout		73,477	89.98	−6.14
Two-party-preferred result
Liberal	Jackie Kelly	40,037	56.55	+4.97
Labor	Ross Free	30,762	43.45	−4.97
Liberal hold		Swing	+4.97	

== Aftermath ==
Jackie Kelly won the by-election with an even larger majority – a swing of 4.97% in her favour.

== See also ==
- List of Australian federal by-elections
