= Husar-rover =

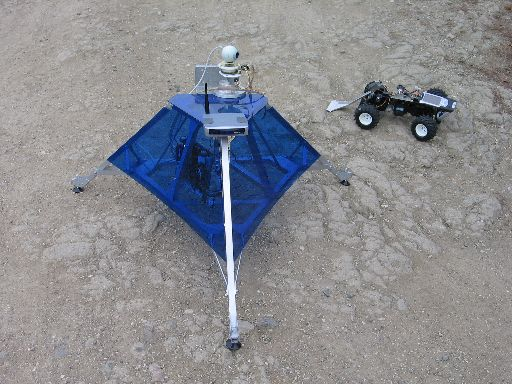
The Hunveyor and Husar models working together.

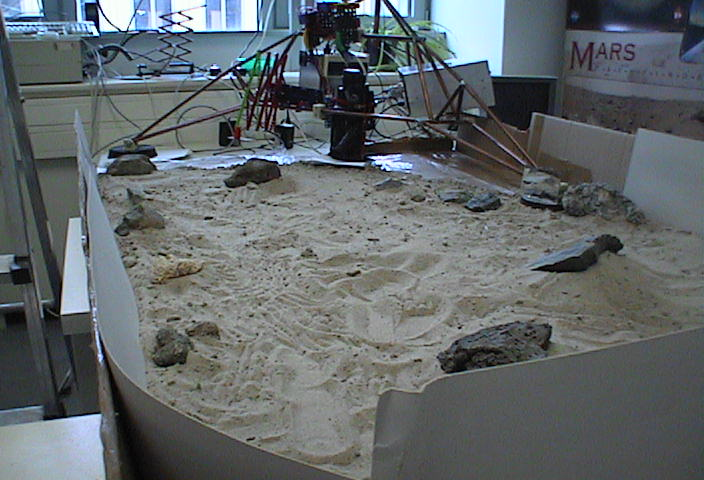
The test table for Hunveyor-1 and Husar-1 at Eotvos University, Budapest.

The HUSAR rover is part of the Hunveyor system. Like as Hunveyor (Hungarian UNiversity SURVEYOR) is an experimental university lander model, so the HUSAR is (Hungarian University Surface Analyser Rover) an experimental university rover model. This rover accompanies the Hunveyor as like Sojourner was accompanying the Mars Pathfinder lander. For the Hunveyor the Surveyor was the example, for the Husar-rover the Mars Pathfinder-Sojourner system was the example from the real space exploration world.

The Hunveyor-Husar system is an educational work at Hungarian Universities, Colleges and High Schools. There are smaller and larger model-cars supported by onboard computer, camera and some additional instrumentation. The building of the Husar-rover types is focusing on the basic planetary surface activities by moving vehicle. The rover has a solar panel on its board placed on a model-car chassis. In the Husar-b version the drive is on the back wheels by electric engines, movements are controlled by the camera view through a wireless connection to the computer. It can be used for roving among rocks and observing their surfaces. On a larger chassis Husar-2a version there are independent driving on all the four wheels. This fact allows directing a special movement. The rover can turn in a very narrow arc which is important to approach objects in side direction. The wheels in one axis are connected by a differential. The structural framework, the driving mechanism all have a left- and right-hand side symmetric structure. The movements are directed through servo engines, which were originally designed for analogous direction, however, even 8 of these servos can be directed by a microcontroller. This microcontroller gets the position of the servos through RS 232 port of the computer. The camera of Husar-2 transmits images with 30 frame/sec, and it has wireless connection with the computer (1200 MHz).

In a planetary simulation work we use testfields which are analog to a selected planetary surface. On the testfields (test table) the most important rock types from the Solar System are arranged around the Hunveyor and Husar. For example, desert sand morphology (according to the observations of Mars Pathfinder) can be modelled around lander and rover in order to give a real planetary environment for simulation studies. Complex studies of the main streams in the surface, wind system and rock interactions also can be modelled. (i.e. stream strength of the wind can be deciphered from the deposition of deflation style of the lee-forms). We show one of our test-fields around Hunveyor and Husar.

Husar rovers were built with Hunveyor-1, -2, and -4 landers, and they were independently built by the Husar-5 and Husar-6 groups at Budapest, Pécs, Székesfehérvár, Sopron and Dorog.
