= Jackie Kelly =

Australian politician (born 1964)

The Honourable Jackie Kelly

Minister for Sport
- In office 21 October 1998 – 26 November 2001
- Prime Minister: John Howard
- Preceded by: Andrew Thomson
- Succeeded by: Rod Kemp

Minister for Tourism
- In office 21 October 1998 – 26 November 2001
- Prime Minister: John Howard
- Preceded by: Andrew Thomson
- Succeeded by: Joe Hockey

Member of the Australian Parliament for Lindsay
- In office 19 October 1996 – 17 October 2007
- Succeeded by: David Bradbury
- In office 2 March 1996 – 11 September 1996
- Preceded by: Ross Free

Personal details
- Born: 18 February 1964 (age 62) Upper Hutt, New Zealand
- Party: Liberal Party of Australia (1996–2014); Independent (2014–)
- Occupation: Legal officer

Jacqueline Marie Kelly (born 18 February 1964) is an Australian former politician who served as a Liberal member of the Australian House of Representatives from 1996 to 2007, representing the Division of Lindsay, New South Wales. She served as Minister for Sport and Tourism in the Howard government, overseeing the 2000 Sydney Olympics.

== Early career ==
Kelly was born in Upper Hutt, New Zealand, and was raised in New Zealand. She attended the Monte Sant' Angelo Mercy College, in North Sydney. She obtained a law degree from the University of Queensland, where she also attained a 'full blue' for rowing, and later represented Australia in the sport.

In 1987, she commenced work with the Corrective Services Department of Queensland and worked as a probation and parole officer. In May 1989, she was admitted to practice as a barrister of the Supreme Court of Queensland. From 1989 to 1996, she was a legal officer (Squadron Leader) with the Royal Australian Air Force (RAAF), and in June 1995, she was awarded the Helsham prize for her services to the RAAF Legal Department.

== Political career ==
=== Federal politics ===
At the March 1996 federal election, Kelly was elected to the Australian parliament for the seat of Lindsay, based around the suburb of Penrith, on the western fringe of Sydney, defeating Labor education minister Ross Free. The 11.5% swing secured was one of the biggest that election, turning a safe Labor seat into a marginal Liberal one. However, six months after the election the New South Wales branch of the Labor Party launched legal proceedings to the Court of Disputed Returns because her employment by the RAAF contravened Section 44 (iv) of the Australian Constitution, which disqualifies from election those who hold an office of profit under the Crown. As well, she still held New Zealand citizenship, in contravention of Section 44 (i).

The NSW Labor Party won the case, and the court declared Kelly's election void on 11 September 1996. After resigning from the RAAF and renouncing her New Zealand citizenship, she was re-elected at the 1996 Lindsay by-election with an increased majority, defeating Ross Free for a second time. At the 1998 federal election, which was largely a referendum on the proposal by Liberal-National Coalition government for a goods and services tax, she was re-elected with a slim majority, but she increased her majority at the 2001 federal election and maintained that margin at the 2004 election.

Kelly was the Minister for Sport and Tourism from October 1998 to November 2001, the Minister Assisting the Prime Minister for the Sydney 2000 Games from October 1998 to January 2001, and Parliamentary Secretary to the Prime Minister from November 2001 to October 2004. She returned to the backbench during her final parliamentary term from 2004 to 2007.

In 1999, Kelly hosted the International Drugs in Sport Summit, which dealt with the doping problem ahead of the 2000 Sydney Olympics. Although the first sitting Australian federal parliamentarian to give birth to a child was Ros Kelly in 1983, in 2000 Kelly became the first serving Australian federal minister to give birth to a child (a daughter named Dominique).

In 2001, Kelly was attacked by the Transport Workers Union for describing the collapse of Ansett Airlines as being "about getting over a little blip and getting back into the very, very bright future that is ahead for tourism". When she was the Minister Assisting the Prime Minister (for the Office of the Status of Women), Kelly was instrumental in the development and implementation of the 'Baby Bonus' scheme, introduced in 2002.

In 2006, she was paired with Pavel Aubrecht when she competed on Torvill and Dean's Dancing on Ice and was eliminated third.

In May 2007, Kelly announced her intention to retire from federal politics at the election to be held later that year.

=== Pamphlet scandal ===
On 21 November 2007, three days before the federal election, an anonymous member of the Liberal Party contacted the assistant secretary of the Australian Labor Party (ALP), Luke Foley, with information that Liberal Party members would be distributing a flyer to letterboxes throughout the suburb of St Marys, linking the ALP with a fictional Islamic organisation. (Due to a redistribution of electoral boundaries, St Marys had been moved from the safe Labor seat of Chifley into Kelly's seat of Lindsay.) Kelly's husband, Gary Clark, and four other people, were caught when they were about to letter-box the pamphlets, which thanked the ALP for supporting Muslim terrorists. Two Liberal Party members (including Jeff Egan, and the husband of the Liberal candidate for Lindsay Greg Chijoff) were forced to resign from the party.

Having already retired, Kelly categorically denied any knowledge of the pamphlets prior to their distribution. When confronted by media at her children's school drop-off the following morning, she stated: "My view is that it is a bit of a Chaser-style prank", referring to the time the satirical TV program, The Chaser, had done a stunt in Mosman that involved claiming a mosque was to be built in the neighbourhood, and asking for comments from people on the street.

=== State politics ===
In February 2014, Kelly unsuccessfully contested the Liberal pre-selection for the seat of Penrith in the NSW parliament, held by Liberal Stuart Ayres. In October 2014, she resigned her Liberal Party membership, stating: "There's no local voice in the Liberal Party, there's no reason to be a member because the lobbyists are running the party", and also blaming the performance of the party's State Executive.

Kelly then contested Penrith at the 2015 New South Wales state election as an independent but was unsuccessful against Liberal incumbent Ayres. She did, however, direct preferences to the ALP's candidate Emma Husar. That contributed to a significant swing away from Ayres on a two-party preferred basis. Husar later won Kelly's old federal seat of Lindsay in 2016 and held it for one term.

== Other ==
=== Sporting achievements ===
Kelly was part of Australia's elite rowing program. She was in line for selection for the Australian rowing team to the Seoul Olympics in 1988, but Rowing Australia opted not to send a women's team. In 1986, Kelly represented Australia in the under 23s rowing, in scull and double scull, as well as the Nationals. She competed in the 1994 World Masters rowing in Brisbane, winning 2 gold, 1 silver and 2 bronze medals, the 1997 Australian Masters Rowing Championships in Canberra, winning 1 gold and 1 bronze, and the 1997 World Masters Rowing Championships in Adelaide, winning 2 gold.

=== Personal life ===
Kelly married Gary Clark, a local orthodontist, on 5 December 1998. They have two children, Dominique and Lachlan.

Political offices
Preceded by Warwick Smith	Minister for Sport and Tourism; 1998–2001	Succeeded by Rod Kemp
Parliament of Australia
Preceded by Ross Free	Member for Lindsay; 1996–2007	Succeeded by David Bradbury
