= Fiona Scott =

Australian politician

Member of the Australian Parliament for Lindsay
- In office 7 September 2013 – 2 July 2016
- Preceded by: David Bradbury
- Succeeded by: Emma Husar

Personal details
- Born: 1 March 1977 (age 49) Penrith, New South Wales, Australia
- Party: Liberal Party of Australia
- Spouse: Aaron Parnell
- Education: University of Western Sydney. University of New South Wales, Australian Graduate School of Management
- Profession: Marketing consultant, politician
- Website: www.fionascott.com.au

Fiona Meryl Scott (born 1 March 1977) is an Australian politician. She was a Liberal member of the Australian House of Representatives, representing the Division of Lindsay in New South Wales from the 2013 election until the 2016 election.

== Early life and education ==
Scott was born in Sydney and educated at Kindalin Christian School. In her senior years she went to St Paul's Grammar School and then studied at the University of Western Sydney where she graduated with a Bachelor of Business. She also holds a Master of Business Administration from the Australian Graduate School of Management (AGSM).

== Career ==
=== Political career ===
Scott contested the seat of Lindsay for the first time at the 2010 federal election receiving a 5.16-point swing towards her. She contested the seat again at the 2013 federal election and won it with a two-party-preferred swing of 4.11%. Scott suffered a 4.10% swing against her at the 2016 federal election and was defeated by Emma Husar.

=== Post-politics ===
In January 2017, Scott commenced providing political commentary on Sky News Australia featuring on PM Agenda later Speers and Paul Murray Live.

In June 2024 at the Federal Council of the Liberal Party, Scott was elected as Federal Vice President of the Liberal Party of Australia.

== Controversies ==
=== Sex appeal comments ===
In the 2013 election campaign, Australian prime minister Tony Abbott described her as having "a bit of sex appeal". Former Labor leader Mark Latham ridiculed these comments, saying that he "had a good look at her" and said that Abbott "must have his beer goggles on".

Parliament of Australia
Preceded by David Bradbury	Member for Lindsay; 2013–2016	Succeeded by Emma Husar
