= Division of Lindsay =

Australian federal electoral division

Coordinates: 33.751°S 150.711°E

Lindsay Australian House of Representatives Division
- Interactive map of electorate boundaries from the 2025 federal election
- Created: 1984
- MP: Melissa McIntosh
- Party: Liberal
- Namesake: Norman Lindsay
- Electors: 121,371 (2025)
- Area: 325 km^{2} (125.5 sq mi)
- Demographic: Outer metropolitan
Electorates around Lindsay:
Macquarie	Macquarie	Macquarie
Macquarie	Lindsay	Chifley
Macquarie	Hume	McMahon; Werriwa

The Division of Lindsay is an Australian electoral division in the state of New South Wales.

Ever since Lindsay was first contested at the 1984 federal election the seat had always elected a member of the party that won the election − a pattern known as a bellwether seat. However, Lindsay's bellwether run ended at the 2016 federal election when Labor's Emma Husar defeated one-term Liberal Fiona Scott.

== History ==
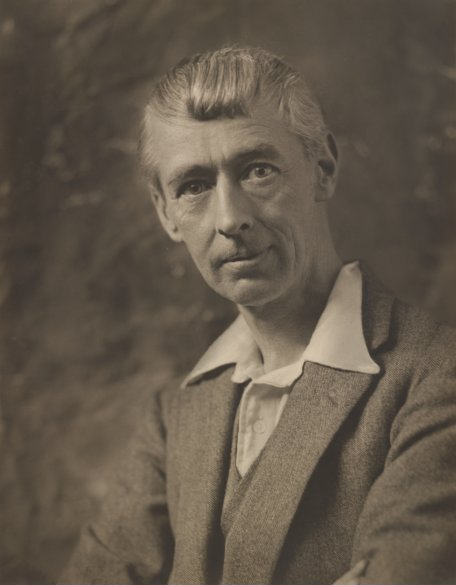
Norman Lindsay, the division's namesake

The division is named after Norman Lindsay, the prominent Australian artist, writer and sculptor. The division was proclaimed at the redistribution of 11 October 1984 and was first contested at the 1984 federal election.

The Division of Lindsay has bellwether status. The 2016, 2022, and 2025 federal elections are the only instances where the member to win the seat has not been from the party to form government. This has been widely attributed to Lindsay's buildup as an economically sensitive seat. The mortgage belt status of the electorate means fiscal matters such as interest rates, job security, petrol prices and quality of transportation are always critical issues at federal elections. The geographic buildup of the seat consists of Liberal voting areas in the west, Labor voting areas in the east and swing areas in the centre.

Prior to the 1996 election, it was considered a safe Labor seat, as it was located in Labor's longstanding heartland of west Sydney. This ended in 1996, when then member Ross Free was thrown from office by Liberal challenger Jackie Kelly on a swing of nearly 12 percent. Free was one of 13 New South Wales Labor MPs to lose their seats in Labor's heavy defeat that year. However a by-election was called when it was revealed that questions about Kelly's citizenship raised eligibility problems. Kelly won the subsequent by-election with an additional 6.69% swing towards her.

Kelly announced her retirement in 2007 which, together with the 2006 redistribution, made Lindsay vulnerable to the Labor candidate, Penrith Mayor David Bradbury. In his third bid for the seat, Bradbury won with a swing of 9.7% after distribution of preferences, defeating the unsuccessful Liberal candidate Karen Chijoff. Three days before the 2007 federal election Liberal Party supporters, including Jackie Kelly's husband, were caught in Lindsay distributing fake pamphlets in residents' letterboxes which linked the Labor Party to Islamic terrorism. For more details see Lindsay pamphlet scandal. Bradbury narrowly retained the seat in 2010 against Liberal Fiona Scott, but she defeated him at the 2013 election receiving a favourable swing towards her in both elections of 5.16% in 2010 and 4.11% in 2013.

However, the bellwether streak ended at the 2016 federal election as Labor's Emma Husar defeated Scott to claim the seat, while overall the Liberal/National coalition narrowly retained government.

== Geography ==
The division is located in the outer western suburbs of Sydney, and is centred on Penrith. It also includes the suburbs of Berkshire Park, Cambridge Gardens, Cambridge Park, Castlereagh, Claremont Meadows, Colyton, Cranebrook, Dunheved, Glenmore Park, Jamisontown, Jordan Springs, Kingswood, Kingswood Park, Lemongrove, Llandilo, Londonderry, Mount Pleasant, North St Marys, Oxley Park, Regentville, South Penrith, St Marys, Werrington, Werrington County, and Werrington Downs; as well as parts of Agnes Banks, Badgerys Creek, Luddenham, Mulgoa, and Orchard Hills.

Since 1984, federal electoral division boundaries in Australia have been determined at redistributions by a redistribution committee appointed by the Australian Electoral Commission. Redistributions occur for the boundaries of divisions in a particular state, and they occur every seven years, or sooner if a state's representation entitlement changes or when divisions of a state are malapportioned.

== Members ==
Image	Member	Party	Term	Notes
	Ross Free (1943–)	Labor	1 December 1984 – 2 March 1996	Previously held the Division of Macquarie. Served as minister under Hawke and Keating. Lost seat
	Jackie Kelly (1964–)	Liberal	2 March 1996 – 11 September 1996	1996 election results declared void, due to dual citizenship and for holding an office of profit under the Crown. Subsequently, re-elected. Served as minister under Howard. Retired
	Jackie Kelly (1964–)	Liberal	19 October 1996 – 17 October 2007	1996 election results declared void, due to dual citizenship and for holding an office of profit under the Crown. Subsequently, re-elected. Served as minister under Howard. Retired
	David Bradbury (1976–)	Labor	24 November 2007 – 7 September 2013	Served as minister under Gillard and Rudd. Lost seat
	Fiona Scott (1977–)	Liberal	7 September 2013 – 2 July 2016	Lost seat
	Emma Husar (1980–)	Labor	2 July 2016 – 11 April 2019	Retired
	Melissa McIntosh (1977–)	Liberal	18 May 2019 – present	Incumbent

== Election results ==
2025 Australian federal election: Lindsay
Party	Candidate	Votes	%	±%
Liberal	Melissa McIntosh	39,003	39.74	−6.68
Labor	Hollie McLean	31,502	32.10	+0.19
Greens	Aaron McAllister	9,416	9.59	+1.63
One Nation	Christopher Buckley	6,736	6.86	+0.86
Trumpet of Patriots	Joseph O'Connor	2,994	3.05	+3.05
Family First	Antony Emmanuel	2,413	2.46	+2.46
Animal Justice	Vanessa Blazi	1,910	1.95	+1.95
Shooters, Fishers, Farmers	Carl Halley	1,844	1.88	+1.88
HEART	Michelle Palmer	1,229	1.25	−0.71
Independent	Jim Saleam	1,099	1.12	+1.12
Total formal votes		98,146	89.09	−3.82
Informal votes		12,020	10.91	+3.82
Turnout		110,166	90.82	+4.26
Two-party-preferred result
Liberal	Melissa McIntosh	51,804	52.78	−3.33
Labor	Hollie McLean	46,342	47.22	+3.33
Liberal hold		Swing	−3.33	
