= Emma Husar =

Former Australian politician

Member of the Australian Parliament for Lindsay
- In office 2 July 2016 – 11 April 2019
- Preceded by: Fiona Scott
- Succeeded by: Melissa McIntosh

Personal details
- Born: 20 April 1980 (age 46) Kingswood, New South Wales, Australia
- Party: Australian Labor Party
- Children: 3

Emma Husar (born 20 April 1980) is a former Australian Labor Party (ALP) member of the Australian House of Representatives for the Division of Lindsay, which she represented from 2016 to 2019. During an internal investigation and media reports regarding staff complaints, Husar decided not to recontest her seat and was disendorsed by the ALP in due course.

== Early life and education ==
Husar was born at Nepean Hospital in Kingswood, New South Wales, in the local government area of the City of Penrith. She attended Caroline Chisholm College and Southport TAFE prior to enrolment at Western Sydney University in a Bachelor of Primary Teaching degree.

== Political career ==
Husar worked in the retail and service sectors. She joined the Labor Party in 2013 and became president of the Penrith Branch (ALP) in 2015. Husar was unsuccessful as the ALP candidate for the seat of Penrith in the 2015 New South Wales state election, but won the seat of Lindsay by defeating the sitting Liberal MP Fiona Scott in the 2016 federal election with a swing of 4.1 percent. Lindsay was regarded as a key marginal seat. During her term in office, Husar sat on parliamentary committees for the National Disability Insurance Scheme; Employment, Education and Training; and Social Policy and Legal Affairs.

=== Internal assessment ===
In July 2018, it was reported that Husar had been the subject of an internal assessment commissioned by the NSW Labor Party since March regarding staff complaints of workplace bullying and misconduct. Husar denied the allegations and took personal leave shortly afterwards, citing threats of violence directed towards her. The investigation upheld complaints that Husar had behaved offensively and unreasonably towards her staff. Separately, claims of lewd conduct and misleading the parliament were rejected. Legal advice based on this assessment prompted the NSW Labor Party to report that there was no basis for Husar to resign from parliament.

=== Endorsement ===
Husar had already been re-endorsed as the party's candidate at the 2019 election, but announced on 8 August 2018 (two days before investigation findings were made public) she would not recontest her marginal seat. Labor accepted her decision. In an interview, Husar said "slut shaming" led to her decision to resign.

In November 2018, Husar said she had changed her mind and disputed that she had ever ceased to be endorsed as the Labor candidate. Husar sought intervention by Labor leader Bill Shorten, who stated that it was not in the best interests of the ALP or Husar for her to recontest the seat. On 7 December 2018, NSW Labor formally disendorsed Husar from recontesting the seat of Lindsay.

She subsequently stated that she would challenge the disendorsement. On 11 December, Labor officially selected Diane Beamer. Apparently, Husar did not nominate for the ALP preselection ballot. On 11 April, she confirmed that she would not contest the seat as an independent at the 2019 federal election.

In May 2021, Husar reportedly threatened legal action against the ALP for sexual harassment.

=== Defamation proceedings ===
In early December 2018, Husar announced that she had launched defamation proceedings in the Federal Court of Australia against BuzzFeed, the originator of the investigation-story, and a journalist. Husar claimed that the publication of unsubstantiated allegations without the right of reply had led to a media storm which ruined her career, thus causing economic loss. In July 2019, Husar and Buzzfeed reached an out-of-court settlement. Buzzfeed subsequently published an apology but avoided admitting liability over the article, instead they did agree to taking it offline.

=== Expenses breaches ===
In March 2019, The Sydney Morning Herald reported that Husar had repaid $2,300 to the Independent Parliamentary Expenses Authority after an audit found that there had been twenty-one individual breaches of travel expenses in an eighteen-month period. Husar explained that approximately ten per cent of the total was related to knee surgery and pneumonia in August 2016.

== Personal life ==
Husar is of Polish descent. She has three children and is single. In a November 2016 parliamentary speech, Husar revealed that she grew up in a family with a history of domestic violence perpetrated by her father. She reportedly moved to Western Australia after leaving politics. In November 2020, Husar stated that she had not worked since she left parliament.

In 2021, she appeared on the reality TV show SAS Australia and was reportedly paid $25,000. Husar said that "It felt like a way of overcoming the issues I faced in 2018 at the end of my Parliamentary career and ‘prove to Australia’ that I am not what I was accused of." Husar left the show when she realised that a calf injury was going to hold her back in physical challenges.

Parliament of Australia
Preceded by Fiona Scott	Member for Lindsay; 2016–2019	Succeeded by Melissa McIntosh
