= Candidates of the 2016 Australian federal election =

This article lists candidates for the 2016 Australian federal election. There were 1,625 candidates in total (994 for the House of Representatives and 631 for the Senate).

== Retiring members ==
=== Labor ===
- Anna Burke MP (Chisholm, Vic) – announced retirement 16 December 2015
- Laurie Ferguson MP (Werriwa, NSW) – announced retirement 12 August 2014
- Gary Gray MP (Brand, WA) – announced retirement 16 February 2016
- Alan Griffin MP (Bruce, Vic) – announced retirement 10 February 2015
- Jill Hall MP (Shortland, NSW) announced retirement 28 February 2016
- Alannah MacTiernan MP (Perth, WA) – announced retirement 12 February 2016
- Melissa Parke MP (Fremantle, WA) – announced retirement 22 January 2016
- Bernie Ripoll MP (Oxley, Qld) – announced retirement 14 April 2015
- Kelvin Thomson MP (Wills, Vic) – announced retirement 10 November 2015
- Senator Joe Ludwig (Qld) – announced retirement 9 March 2015
- Senator Jan McLucas (Qld) – announced retirement 5 April 2015
- Senator Nova Peris (NT) – announced retirement 24 May 2016

=== Liberal ===
- Bob Baldwin MP (Paterson, NSW) – announced retirement 16 April 2016
- Bruce Billson MP (Dunkley, Vic) – announced retirement 24 November 2015
- Bronwyn Bishop MP (Mackellar, NSW) – lost preselection 16 April 2016, delivered valedictory speech 4 May 2016
- Mal Brough MP (Fisher, Qld) – announced retirement 26 February 2016
- Teresa Gambaro MP (Brisbane, Qld) – announced retirement 9 March 2016
- Ian Macfarlane MP (Groom, Qld) – announced retirement 15 February 2016
- Andrew Robb MP (Goldstein, Vic) – announced retirement 10 February 2016
- Philip Ruddock MP (Berowra, NSW) – announced retirement 8 February 2016
- Bruce Scott MP (Maranoa, Qld) – announced retirement 3 August 2015
- Andrew Southcott MP (Boothby, SA) – announced retirement 4 September 2015
- Sharman Stone MP (Murray, Vic) – announced retirement 26 March 2016
- Senator Bill Heffernan (NSW) – announced retirement 19 February 2016

=== National ===
- John Cobb MP (Calare, NSW) – announced retirement 27 February 2016
- Warren Truss MP (Wide Bay, Qld) – announced retirement 11 February 2016

=== Palmer United ===
- Clive Palmer MP (Fairfax, Qld) – announced retirement 4 May 2016, ruled out Senate candidacy 23 May 2016

== House of Representatives ==
Sitting members are listed in bold text. Successful candidates are highlighted in the relevant colour. Where there is possible confusion, an asterisk (*) is also used.

=== Australian Capital Territory ===
Electorate	Held by	Labor candidate	Liberal candidate	Greens candidate	Other candidates
Canberra	Labor	**Gai Brodtmann**	Jessica Adelan-Langford	Patricia Cahill	Christopher Bucknell (BTFA)
Fenner	Labor	**Andrew Leigh**	Robert Gunning	Carly Saeedi	Tim Bohm (BTFA); Andrew Woodman (Ind)

=== New South Wales ===
Electorate	Held by	Labor candidate	Coalition candidate	Greens candidate	CDP candidate	Other candidates
Banks	Liberal	Chris Gambian	**David Coleman** (Lib)	Philippa Clark	Greg Bondar	Roy Barnes (AJP); Bob Spanswick (Ind); Sharon Wu (FFP)
Barton	Labor	Linda Burney	**Nickolas Varvaris** (Lib)	Brent Heber	Sonny Susilo	Rasmus Torkel (Ind); Harry Tsoukalas (ODD)
Bennelong	Liberal	Lyndal Howison	**John Alexander** (Lib)	Justin Alick	Julie Worsley	John August (PPA); Christopher Gordon (Arts); Martin Mulcare (Ind)
Berowra	Liberal	Josh Andrews	Julian Leeser (Lib)	Emma Heyde	Leighton Thew	Brendan Clarke (SP); Mick Gallagher (Ind); Roger Woodward (Ind)
Blaxland	Labor	**Jason Clare**	Felicity Findlay (Lib)	Suzan Virago	Clint Nasr	Gabriela Zabala (SEP)
Bradfield	Liberal	Katie Gompertz	**Paul Fletcher** (Lib)	Adrian Jones	Chris Vale	Christine Berman (Ind); Peter Kelly (ALA)
Calare	National	Jess Jennings	Andrew Gee (Nat)	Delanie Sky	Bernie Gesling	Rod Bloomfield (NXT); Anthony Craig (Ind); Glen Davis (LDP)
Chifley	Labor	**Ed Husic**	Mohit Kumar (Lib)	Eliza James	Josh Green	Ammar Khan (Ind)
Cook	Liberal	David Atkins	**Scott Morrison** (Lib)	Nathan Hunt	George Capsis	John Brett (Ind)
Cowper	National	Damian Wood	**Luke Hartsuyker** (Nat)	Carol Vernon	Wendy Lawrence	John Arkan (Ind); Michael Gough (CEC); Rob Oakeshott (Ind)
Cunningham	Labor	**Sharon Bird**	Michelle Blicavs (Lib)	Cath Blakey	Michelle Ryan	John Flanagan (NCPP); Nathan Waters (SP)
Dobell	Labor	Emma McBride	**Karen McNamara** (Lib)	Abigail Boyd	Hadden Ervin	Paul Baker (Ind); Carter Edwards (ON); Gregory Stephenson (Ind)
Eden-Monaro	Liberal	Mike Kelly	**Peter Hendy** (Lib)	Tamara Ryan	Ursula Bennett	Ray Buckley (Ind); Don Friend (ADVP); Daniel Grosmaire (Ind); Frankie Seymour (AJP); Andrew Thaler (Ind)
Farrer	Liberal	Christian Kunde (disendorsed)	**Sussan Ley** (Lib)	Amanda Cohn	Paul Rossetto	Brian Mills (Ind); Trevor O'Brien (MAP); Ron Pike (ALA)
Fowler	Labor	**Chris Hayes**	Adam Farhan (Lib)	Bill Cashman	Craig Hall	Joaquim de Lima (SRP)
Gilmore	Liberal	Fiona Phillips	**Ann Sudmalis** (Lib)	Carmel McCallum	Steve Ryan	
Grayndler	Labor	**Anthony Albanese**	David van Gogh (Lib)	Jim Casey	Jamie Elvy	Oscar Grenfell (SEP); Chris Hindi (DLR); Emma Hurst (AJP); Noel McFarlane (ACP); Chris McLachlan (REP); Meow-Ludo Meow-Meow (SP); Pat Sheil (Sex)
Greenway	Labor	**Michelle Rowland**	Yvonne Keane (Lib)	Chris Winslow	Aaron Wright	Avtar Billu (Ind); Timothy Mak (LDP); Rohan Salins (FFP); Vivek Singha (SP)
Hughes	Liberal	Diedree Steinwall	**Craig Kelly** (Lib)	Phil Smith	Michael Caudre	Ellie Robertson (AJP)
Hume	Liberal	Aoife Champion-Fashoyin	**Angus Taylor** (Lib)	Michaela Sherwood	Adrian Van Der Byl	Trevor Anthoney (BTFA); Lindsay Cosgrove (CEC)
Hunter	Labor	**Joel Fitzgibbon**	Ruth Rogers (Nat)	Peter Morris	Richard Stretton	John Harvey (Ind); Arjay Martin (Ind); Cordelia Troy (Ind); John Warham (Ind)
Kingsford Smith	Labor	**Matt Thistlethwaite**	Michael Feneley (Lib)	James Macdonald	Andrew Weatherstone	Andrea Leong (SP)
Lindsay	Liberal	Emma Husar	**Fiona Scott** (Lib)	Kingsley Liu	Warren Wormald	Debbie Blundell (AJP); Marcus Cornish (-); Scott Grimley (DHJP); Linda La Brooy (FFP); Stephen Lynch (NXT); Steve Roddick (ALA); Jim Saleam (AFP)
Lyne	National	Peter Alley	**David Gillespie** (Nat)	Julie Lyford	Elaine Carter	Brad Christensen (Ind); Rodger Riach (Ind)
Macarthur	Liberal	Mike Freelander	**Russell Matheson** (Lib)	Ben Moroney	James Gent	Richard Bakoss (NXT)
Mackellar	Liberal	Rhonda Funnell	Jason Falinski (Lib)	Mike Hall	Annie Wright	Jim Ball (Ind); Liam Gavin (Ind); Julie Hegarty (Ind)
Macquarie	Liberal	Susan Templeman	**Louise Markus** (Lib)	Terry Morgan	Catherine Lincoln	Liz Cooper (DHJP); Hal Ginges (AJP); Jake Grizelj (SFFP); Carl Halley (ALA); Olya Shornikov (LDP)
McMahon	Labor	**Chris Bowen**	George Bilic (Lib)	Astrid O'Neill	Milan Maksimovic	Fadhel Shamasha (Ind); Victor Waterson (AFP)
Mitchell	Liberal	Andrew Punch	**Alex Hawke** (Lib)	Michael Bellstedt	Darryl Allen	
New England	National	David Ewings	**Barnaby Joyce** (Nat)	Mercurius Goldstein	Stan Colefax	Philip Cox (Ind); David Mailler (CM); Rob Taber (Ind); Robert Walker (ODD); Peter Whelan (LDP); Tony Windsor (Ind)
Newcastle	Labor	**Sharon Claydon**	David Compton (Lib)	John Mackenzie	Milton Caine	Karen Burge (DLR); Rod Holding (Ind); Stuart Southwell (DLP)
North Sydney	Liberal	Peter Hayes	**Trent Zimmerman** (Lib)	Arthur Chesterfield-Evans	Sharon Martin	James Coffey (SP); Eddy Ku (FFP); Daniel Leahy (LDP); Stephen Ruff (Ind)
Page	National	Janelle Saffin	**Kevin Hogan** (Nat)	Kudra Falla-Ricketts	Bethany McAlpine	Mark Ellis (LDP); Anna Ludvick (AJP)
Parkes	National	Kate Stewart	**Mark Coulton** (Nat)	Matt Parmeter	Glen Ryan	John Ayton (ODD)
Parramatta	Labor	**Julie Owens**	Michael Beckwith (Lib)	Phil Bradley	Keith Piper	Andrew Driessen (ODD); Mark Guest (LDP); Mahesh Raj (Ind); Mikaela Wu (FFP)
Paterson	Labor	Meryl Swanson	Karen Howard (Lib)	John Brown	Peter Arena	Graham Burston (ON); Brian Clare (RUAP); Peter Davis (CEC)
Reid	Liberal	Angelo Tsirekas	**Craig Laundy** (Lib)	Alice Mantel	Chris Kang	Marylou Carter (FFP)
Richmond	Labor	**Justine Elliot**	Matthew Fraser (Nat)	Dawn Walker	Russell Kilarney	Angela Pollard (AJP); Neil Smith (ON)
Riverina	National	Tim Kurylowicz	**Michael McCormack** (Nat)	Kevin Poynter	Philip Langfield	Richard Foley (Ind); Glenn O'Rourke (FFP)
Robertson	Liberal	Anne Charlton	**Lucy Wicks** (Lib)	Hillary Morris	Robert Stoddart	Matthew Craig (LDP); Van Davy (Ind); Lawrie Higgins (AAP)
Shortland	Labor	**Pat Conroy**	Jenny Barrie (Lib)	Ivan MacFadyen	Morgan Cox	
Sydney	Labor	**Tanya Plibersek**	Geoffrey Winters (Lib)	Sylvie Ellsmore	Ula Falanga	Mark Berriman (AJP); Peter Boyle (SA); Tom Geiser (SP); Rebecca Lanning (Sex); Kris Spike (SA); Tula Tzoras (ODD)
Warringah	Liberal	Andrew Woodward	**Tony Abbott** (Lib)	Clara Williams Roldan	June Scifo	Tony Backhouse (Ind); David Barrow (Ind); Shea Caplice (Arts); Marc Giordano (SP); James Mathison (Ind); Marie Rowland (NXT)
Watson	Labor	**Tony Burke**	Mohammad Zaman (Lib)	Barbara Bloch	Violet Abdulla	Paul Geran (ODD); Tom Gordon (SP)
Wentworth	Liberal	Evan Hughes	**Malcolm Turnbull** (Lib)	Dejay Toborek	Beresford Thomas	Anthony Ackroyd (Arts); David Allen (Ind); Marc Aussie-Stone (Ind); Peter Xing (SP)
Werriwa	Labor	Anne Stanley	Ned Mannoun (Lib)	Signe Westerberg	Daniel Edwards	
Whitlam	Labor	**Stephen Jones**	Marcus Hewitt (Lib); Jan Mandelson (Nat)	Tom Hunt	Susan Pinsuti	Wayne Hartman (NCPP)

=== Northern Territory ===
Electorate	Held by	Labor candidate	CLP candidate	Greens candidate	Shooters candidate	Other candidates
Lingiari	Labor	**Warren Snowdon**	Tina MacFarlane	Rob Hoad	Chris Righton	Braedon Earley (Ind); Peter Flynn (CEC); Alfred Gould (Ind); Yingiya Mark Guyula (Ind); Regina McCarthy (RUAP)
Solomon	CLP	Luke Gosling	**Natasha Griggs**	Todd Williams	Marty Reinhold	Nevin Cartwright (ODD); Robert Dawes (LDP); Mark Garner (Ind); John Kearney (AFP); Lance Lawrence (HEMP); Silvija Majetic (RUAP); Brigid McCullough (CEC)

=== Queensland ===
Electorate	Held by	Labor candidate	LNP candidate	Greens candidate	FFP candidate	Other candidates
Blair	Labor	**Shayne Neumann**	Teresa Harding	Pat Walsh	Geoff Darr	Troy Aggett (ON); Jonathan Emms (Ind); Patricia Petersen (Ind); Sandy Turner (Ind)
Bonner	LNP	Laura Fraser Hardy	**Ross Vasta**	Ken Austin	Andrew Broughton	Matthew Linney (LDP); Jarrod Wirth (Ind)
Bowman	LNP	Kim Richards	**Andrew Laming**	Brad Scott	Brett Saunders	Tony Duncan (ALA)
Brisbane	LNP	Pat O'Neill	Trevor Evans	Kirsten Lovejoy	Mark Vegar	Bridget Clinch (ADVP); John Humphreys (LDP)
Capricornia	LNP	Leisa Neaton	**Michelle Landry**	Kate Giamarelos	Lindsay Temple	Laurel Carter (KAP); Ken Murray (Ind)
Dawson	LNP	Frank Gilbert	**George Christensen**	Jonathon Dykyj	Amanda Nickson	Ash Dodd (KAP); Michael Hall (GLT); Stephen Large (Ind)
Dickson	LNP	Linda Lavarch	**Peter Dutton**	Michael Berkman	Ray Hutchinson	Doug Nicholson (LDP); Thor Prohaska (Ind)
Fadden	LNP	Meaghan Scanlon	**Stuart Robert**	Daniel Kwon	Lyn Rees	Brenden Ball (ON); Sean Macnamara (ADVP)
Fairfax	Palmer United	Scott Anderson	Ted O'Brien	Sue Etheridge	David Rees	Kris Bullen (ODD); Keith Campbell (Ind); Robert Dickson (Ind); Robert Pasquali (ON)
Fisher	LNP	Bill Gissane	Andrew Wallace	Tony Gibson	Caroline Ashlin	Tracey Bell-Henselin (RUAP); Jason Burgess (ADVP); Mike Jessop (Ind); LB Joum (ODD); John Spellman (ALA)
Flynn	LNP	Zac Beers	**Ken O'Dowd**	Craig Tomsett	Heather Barnett	Phil Baker (ON); Nathan Fletcher (Ind); Richard Love (KAP); Jordan Puku (Ind); Duncan Scott (Ind)
Forde	LNP	Des Hardman	**Bert van Manen**	Sally Spain	Annelise Hellberg	Shaun Spain (ALA); David Wilks (Ind)
Griffith	Labor	**Terri Butler**	Fiona Ward	Karen Anderson	Theresa Graham	Bronwyn Ablett (LDP); Karel Boele (Ind); Matt Darragh (ALA); John Jiggens (DLR)
Groom	LNP	Bronwyn Herbertson	John McVeigh	Antonia van Geuns	John Sands	Josie Townsend (NXT)
Herbert	LNP	Cathy O'Toole	**Ewen Jones**	Wendy Tubman	Michael Punshon	Martin Brewster (PUP); Colin Dwyer (KAP); David Harris (LDP); Aaron Raffin (GLT); Geoff Virgo (ON)
Hinkler	LNP	Tim Lawson	**Keith Pitt**	Tim Roberts	Stephen Lynch	Bill Foster (Ind); Damian Huxham (ON); Robert Windred (ALA)
Kennedy	KAP	Norm Jacobsen	Jonathan Pavetto	Valerie Weier	Donna Gallehawk	**Bob Katter** (KAP)
Leichhardt	LNP	Sharryn Howes	**Warren Entsch**	Kurt Pudniks	Ned Gebadi	John Kelly (RUAP); Daniel McCarthy (Ind); Michael Newie (Ind); Peter Rogers (ON); Brad Tassell (KAP)
Lilley	Labor	**Wayne Swan**	David Kingston	Claire Ogden	Sharan Hall	Simon Holmick (LDP)
Longman	LNP	Susan Lamb	**Wyatt Roy**	Ian Bell	Will Smith	Stephen Beck (Arts); Brad Kennedy (KAP); Rob Law (Ind); Frances McDonald (DLR); Michelle Pedersen (ON); Greg Riddell (Ind); Caleb Wells (-)
Maranoa	LNP	Dave Kerrigan	David Littleproud	Katherine Hompes	Myfanwy Schenk	Luke Arbuckle (CM); Sherrilyn Church (RUAP); Rick Gurnett (KAP); Lynette Keehn (ON)
McPherson	LNP	Sandy Gadd	**Karen Andrews**	Peter Burgoyne	Simon Green	Rob Jones (Ind)
Moncrieff	LNP	Hayden Sheppard	**Steven Ciobo**	Roger Brisbane	Julie Rose	
Moreton	Labor	**Graham Perrett**	Nic Monsour	Kristen Lyons	Florian Heise	Andrew Cooper (LDP); Shan-Ju Lin (KAP); Des Soares (NXT)
Oxley	Labor	Milton Dick	Bibe Roadley	Steve Purcell	Caroline McCormack	Stephen Lacaze (KAP); Brad Trussell (ON)
Petrie	LNP	Jacqui Pedersen	**Luke Howarth**	Sue Weber	Mark White	Catherine Buckley (LDP); Andrew Tyrell (Arts)
Rankin	Labor	**Jim Chalmers**	Freya Ostapovitch	Neil Cotter	Christopher Lawrie	Ric Davies (LDP); Jeffrey Hodges (CRNT); Shane Holley (KAP)
Ryan	LNP	Stephen Hegedus	**Jane Prentice**	Sandra Bayley	David Todd	Sly Gryphon (LDP); John Quinn (DLP)
Wide Bay	LNP	Lucy Stanton	Llew O'Brien	Bron Marsh	Bruce Mayer	Barry Cook (KAP); Elise Anne Cottam (ON); Jannean Dean (GLT)
Wright	LNP	Allistair Smith	**Scott Buchholz**	Pietro Agnoletto	Barry Austin	John Cox (MAP); Rod Smith (ON); Mark Stone (LDP)

=== South Australia ===
Electorate	Held by	Labor candidate	Liberal candidate	Greens candidate	Xenophon candidate	FFP candidate	Other candidates
Adelaide	Labor	**Kate Ellis**	David Colovic	Sophie Guy	Joe Hill	Adrian Rivish	Tyrone Lock (LDP); Matt Tidswell (AJP)
Barker	Liberal	Mat O'Brien	**Tony Pasin**	Mark Keough	James Stacey	Yvonne Zeppel	
Boothby	Liberal	Mark Ward	Nicolle Flint	Jane Bange	Karen Hockley	Gary Wheatcroft	Jamie Armfield (Ind); Evelyn Carroll (AJP); Rob de Jonge (Ind)
Grey	Liberal	Scott Martin	**Rowan Ramsey**	Jillian Marsh	Andrea Broadfoot	Cheryl Kaminski	Phillip Gourlay (Ind)
Hindmarsh	Liberal	Steve Georganas	**Matt Williams**	Patrick O'Sullivan	Daniel Kirk	Mark Potter	Alyssa Liu (AJP); Marina William (CDP)
Kingston	Labor	**Amanda Rishworth**	Kelvin Binns	Robyn Holtham	Damian Carey	Geoff Doecke	
Makin	Labor	**Tony Zappia**	Graham Reynolds	Keiran Snape	Craig Bossie	Paul Coombe	Mark Aldridge (Ind); Zarina Greenberg (AJP)
Mayo	Liberal	Glen Dallimore	**Jamie Briggs**	Nathan Daniell	Rebekha Sharkie	Bruce Hicks	Luke Dzivinski (LDP)
Port Adelaide	Labor	**Mark Butler**	Emma Flowerdew	Matthew Carey	Michael Slattery	Bruce Hambour	Janine Clipstone (AJP); Jenalie Salt (CDP)
Sturt	Liberal	Matt Loader	**Christopher Pyne**	Rebecca Galdies	Matthew Wright	Craig Bowyer	Neil Aitchison (Ind); Geoff Russell (AJP)
Wakefield	Labor	**Nick Champion**	Kathleen Bourne	Craig Vanstone	Richard Inwood	Marilyn Phillips	Ralph Anderson (CDP); John Bolton (Ind)

=== Tasmania ===
Electorate	Held by	Labor candidate	Liberal candidate	Greens candidate	CDP candidate	Other candidates
Bass	Liberal	Ross Hart	**Andrew Nikolic**	Terrill Riley-Gibson	Malcolm Beattie	Roy Ramage (REP); Mark Tapsell (ARFP)
Braddon	Liberal	Justine Keay	**Brett Whiteley**	Scott Jordan	Graham Hodge	Joshua Boag (LDP); Clinton Rice (REP); Glen Saltmarsh (ARFP)
Denison	Independent	Jane Austin	Marcus Allan	Jen Brown	Amanda Excell	**Andrew Wilkie*** (Ind); Wayne Williams (DLP)
Franklin	Labor	**Julie Collins**	Amanda-Sue Markham	Martine Delaney	George Muskett	Tim Sanderson (Arts)
Lyons	Liberal	Brian Mitchell	**Eric Hutchinson**	Hannah Rubenach-Quinn	Gene Mawer	Duncan Livingston (REP); Shelley Shay (ARFP)

=== Victoria ===
Electorate	Held by	Labor candidate	Coalition candidate	Greens candidate	FFP candidate	Other candidates
Aston	Liberal	Paul Klisaris	**Alan Tudge** (Lib)	Steve Raymond	Daniel Martin	Daniel Huppert (Ind); Rosemary Lavin (AJP); Joel Moore (LDP)
Ballarat	Labor	**Catherine King**	Paul Tatchell (Nat); Sarah Wade (Lib)	Alice Barnes	Graham Howard	Dianne Colbert (AC); Brian Eckel (Ind); Tran Tran (RUAP)
Batman	Labor	**David Feeney**	George Souris (Lib)	Alex Bhathal		Geoffrey Cicuto (ACP); Caitlin Evans (AJP); Franco Guardiani (Ind); Russell Hayward (AP); Joel Murray (ASXP); Maurice Oldis (REP); Philip Sutton (Ind); Elizabeth Syber (AEP)
Bendigo	Labor	**Lisa Chesters**	Andy Maddison (Nat); Megan Purcell (Lib)	Rosemary Glaisher	Alan Howard	Sandra Caddy (RUAP); Anita Donlon (Ind); Ruth Parramore (AJP)
Bruce	Labor	Julian Hill	Helen Kroger (Lib)	Stefanie Bauer	Nathan Foggie	Jill Jarvis-Wills (REP); Doug Leith (AJP); Alan Roncan (DLR)
Calwell	Labor	**Maria Vamvakinou**	John Hsu (Lib) (disendorsed)	Natalie Abboud		Michael Lakkis (Ind); Meagan Searls (AJP)
Casey	Liberal	Hovig Melkonian	**Tony Smith** (Lib)	Elissa Sutherland		Kristin Bacon (AJP); Peter Charleton (Ind); Angela Dorian (RUAP)
Chisholm	Labor	Stefanie Perri	Julia Banks (Lib)	Josh Fergeus	Craig McCracken	Melanie Vassiliou (RUAP); Nyree Walshe (AJP)
Corangamite	Liberal	Libby Coker	**Sarah Henderson** (Lib)	Patchouli Paterson	Alan Barron	Courtney Dalton (DLR); Michael Lawrence (Ind); Andy Meddick (AJP); Patrice Nelson (DHJP); Louis Rowe (LDP); Nick Steel (RUAP)
Corio	Labor	**Richard Marles**	Richard Lange (Lib)	Sarah Mansfield		Sue Bull (SA); Jeff Moran (BTFA); Jamie Overend (AJP); Ash Puvimanasinghe (RUAP)
Deakin	Liberal	Tony Clark	**Michael Sukkar** (Lib)	Joshua Briers	Gary Coombes	Vanessa Brown (AJP); Karen Dobby (AC)
Dunkley	Liberal	Peta Murphy	Chris Crewther (Lib)	Jeanette Swain	Michael Rathbone	Sally Baillieu (Arts); Tyson Jack (AJP); Jeff Reaney (AC); Ruth Stanfield (DHJP); Joseph Toscano (Ind); Lin Tregenza (RUAP); Tim Wilms (LDP)
Flinders	Liberal	Carolyn Gleixner	**Greg Hunt** (Lib)	Willisa Hogarth		Yvonne Gentle (RUAP); Shane Lewis (Ind); Ben Wild (AJP)
Gellibrand	Labor	**Tim Watts**	Ben Willis (Lib)	Jonathon Marsden		David Tran (Ind)
Gippsland	National	Shashi Bhatti	**Darren Chester** (Nat)	Ian Onley	Brian Heath	Ashleigh Belsar (AC); Ben Buckley (LDP); Peter Dorian (RUAP); Peter Gardner (REP); Christine Sindt (Ind); Cherie Smith (Ind)
Goldstein	Liberal	Matthew Coote	Tim Wilson (Lib)	Cheryl Hercus	Trevor Bishop	Naren Chellappah (AJP); Lee Kavanagh (DLR)
Gorton	Labor	**Brendan O'Connor**	Daryl Lang (Lib)	Rod Swift		
Higgins	Liberal	Carl Katter	**Kelly O'Dwyer** (Lib)	Jason Ball		Nancy Bassett (NXT); Eleonora Gullone (AJP); Robert Kennedy (LDP); Rebecca O'Brien (AEP); Jessica Tregear (DHJP)
Holt	Labor	**Anthony Byrne**	James Mathias (Lib)	Jake Tilton	Neil Bull	Colin Robertson (RUAP)
Hotham	Labor	**Clare O'Neil**	George Hua (Lib)	James Bennett	Tatiana Rathbone	Helen Jeges (AJP); Peter Vassiliou (RUAP)
Indi	Independent	Eric Kerr	Marty Corboy (Nat); Sophie Mirabella (Lib)	Jenny O'Connor		Ray Dyer (Ind); Vincent Ferrando (RUAP); Julian Fidge (Country); Alan Lappin (Ind); **Cathy McGowan*** (Ind); Tim Quilty (LDP)
Isaacs	Labor	**Mark Dreyfus**	Garry Spencer (Lib)	Alex Breskin		Elizabeth Johnstone (AJP)
Jagajaga	Labor	**Jenny Macklin**	David Mulholland (Lib)	Hugh McKinnon	Jessica Ward	Nathan Schram (AJP)
Kooyong	Liberal	Marg D'Arcy	**Josh Frydenberg** (Lib)	Helen McLeod		Angelina Zubac (Ind)
La Trobe	Liberal	Simon Curtis	**Jason Wood** (Lib)	Tom Cummings	Jeffrey Bartram	Julieanne Doidge (DHJP); David Fent (SFFP); Leah Folloni (AJP); Les Hughes (LDP); Martin Leahy (ASXP); Margaret Quinn (RUAP)
Lalor	Labor	**Joanne Ryan**	Gayle Murphy (Lib)	Daniel Sova		Susan Jakobi (AFP); Marion Vale (RUAP)
Mallee	National	Lydia Senior	**Andrew Broad** (Nat)	Helen Healy		Chris Lahy (CEC); Tim Middleton (RUAP)
Maribyrnong	Labor	**Bill Shorten**	Ted Hatzakortzian (Lib)	Olivia Ball		Catherine Cumming (Ind); Fiona McRostie (AJP); Anthony O'Neill (AC)
McEwen	Labor	**Rob Mitchell**	James Anderson (Nat); Chris Jermyn (Lib)	Neil Barker	Dorothy Long	Tracey Andrew (Country); Ross Lee (Ind); Jeff Truscott (RUAP); Cathy Vaina (AJP)
McMillan	Liberal	Chris Buckingham	**Russell Broadbent** (Lib)	Donna Lancaster	Nathan Harding	Norman Baker (RUAP); Kathleen Ipsen (AC); Jennifer McAdam (AJP); Jim McDonald (LDP)
Melbourne	Greens	Sophie Ismail	Philip Liu (Lib)	**Adam Bandt**		Lewis Freeman-Harrison (ASXP); Matt Riley (DLR); Miranda Smith (AJP)
Melbourne Ports	Labor	**Michael Danby**	Owen Guest (Lib)	Steph Hodgins-May		Peter Holland (Ind); Levi McKenzie-Kirkbright (DLR); John Myers (Ind); Rob Smyth (AJP); Henry von Doussa (AEP)
Menzies	Liberal	Adam Rundell	**Kevin Andrews** (Lib)	Richard Cranston	David Clark	Jay Franklin (VEP); Antony Hulbert (AJP); Stephen Mayne (Ind); Ramon Robinson (Ind)
Murray	Liberal	Alan Williams	Damian Drum* (Nat); Duncan McGauchie (Lib)	Ian Christoe		Andrew Bock (Ind); Robert Danieli (Country); Jeff Davy (CEC); Yasmin Gunasekera (RUAP); Nigel Hicks (Ind); Fern Summer (Ind); Diane Teasdale (Ind)
Scullin	Labor	**Andrew Giles**	Melanie Stockman (Lib)	Rose Ljubicic		Adriana Buccianti (DLR); John Matlen (AJP)
Wannon	Liberal	Michael Barling	**Dan Tehan** (Lib)	Thomas Campbell		Bernardine Atkinson (Ind); Michael McCluskey (Ind)
Wills	Labor	Peter Khalil	Kevin Hong (Lib)	Samantha Ratnam		Zane Alcorn (SA); Ash Blackwell (DLR); Tristram Chellew (ASXP); Will Fulgenzi (SEP); Dougal Gillman (REP); Camille Sydow (AJP); Francesco Timpano (Ind)

=== Western Australia ===
Electorate	Held by	Labor candidate	Liberal candidate	Greens candidate	Christians candidate	Other candidates
Brand	Labor	Madeleine King	Craig Buchanan	Dawn Jecks	Bob Burdett	Philip Scott (RUAP)
Burt	Liberal	Matt Keogh	Matt O'Sullivan	Muhammad Salman	Warnar Spyker	Ian Blevin (SFFP)
Canning	Liberal	Barry Winmar	**Andrew Hastie**	Aeron Blundell-Camden	Janine Vander Ven	Jason Turner (Nat)
Cowan	Liberal	Anne Aly	**Luke Simpkins**	Sheridan Young	Rex Host	Jamie Chester (SFFP); Neil Hamilton (LDP); Steve Veness (MAP)
Curtin	Liberal	Melissa Callanan	**Julie Bishop**	Viv Glance		David Archibald (ALA); Sandra Boulter (Ind)
Durack	Liberal	Carol Martin	**Melissa Price**	Ian James	Grahame Gould	Lisa Cole (Nat); Mitchell Sambell (RUAP)
Forrest	Liberal	Lorrae Loud	**Nola Marino**	Jill Reading	Edward Dabrowski	David Fishlock (ORP); Luke Pilkington (Nat); Ross Slater (Ind); Jennifer Whately (RUAP)
Fremantle	Labor	Josh Wilson	Pierrette Kelly	Kate Davis		Mick Connolly (MAP); Chris Jenkins (SA)
Hasluck	Liberal	Bill Leadbetter	**Ken Wyatt**	Patrick Hyslop	Phil Twiss	Henry Barnard (RUAP)
Moore	Liberal	Tony Walker	**Ian Goodenough**	Daniel Lindley	Maryka Groenewald	
O'Connor	Liberal	Jon Ford	**Rick Wilson**	Giz Watson	Trevor Young	Stephen Carson (RUAP); John Hassell (Nat)
Pearce	Liberal	Tom French	**Christian Porter**	Lee-Anne Miles		Taffy Samuriwo-Vuntarde (RUAP); Maddison Simmonds (Nat)
Perth	Labor	Tim Hammond	Jeremy Quinn	Tim Clifford		Andrew Chambers (ODD); Mark Walmsley (LDP)
Stirling	Liberal	Robert Pearson	**Michael Keenan**	Tom Webster	Kevin Host	Kim Mubarak (Ind); Alison Rowe (RUAP)
Swan	Liberal	Tammy Solonec	**Steve Irons**	Sarah Nielsen-Harvey	Steve Klomp	
Tangney	Liberal	Marion Boswell	Ben Morton	Thor Kerr	John Wieske	**Dennis Jensen** (Ind)

== Senate ==
Sitting senators are listed in bold. Since this was a double dissolution election, each state elected twelve senators. Typically, the first six successful candidates from each state are elected to six-year terms, the remaining six to three-year terms, although this can create distorted results in the single transferable vote system. Section 282 of the Commonwealth Electoral Act provides for a fairer method of allocation, involving a re-count of the Senate votes cast as if the election had been a half-Senate election for six seats. The long term seats are allocated to those elected in the re-count, and the short-term positions allocated to the remaining elected candidates.

Ultimately, the power to determine terms is given under the Constitution to the Senate. Following the 1987 double dissolution, the Senate chose to ignore the alternative count and instead use the traditional method based on order of election.

Tickets that elected at least one Senator are highlighted in the relevant colour. Successful candidates are identified by an asterisk (*).

=== Australian Capital Territory ===
Two seats were up for election. The Labor Party was defending one seat. The Liberal Party was defending one seat.

Labor candidates	Liberal candidates	Greens candidates	AJP candidates	CDP candidates
1. **Katy Gallagher***; 2. David Smith	1. **Zed Seselja***; 2. Jane Hiatt	1. Christina Hobbs; 2. Sue Wareham	1. Deborah Field; 2. Jessica Montagne	1. David Kim; 2. Elizabeth Tadros
LDP candidates	RUAP candidates	Secular candidates	Sex Party candidates	#Sustainable candidates
1. Matt Donnelly; 2. Cawley Hennings	1. Sandie O'Connor; 2. Jess Wyatt	1. David Edwards; 2. Denis Mihaljevic	1. Steven Bailey; 2. Robbie Swan	1. John Haydon; 2. Martin Tye
Ungrouped candidates
Michael Hay (VOTEFLUX); Anthony Hanson (Mature)

=== New South Wales ===
Twelve seats were up for election. The Labor Party was defending four seats. The Liberal/National Coalition was defending six seats. The Australian Greens were defending one seat. The Liberal Democratic Party was defending one seat.

Labor candidates	Coalition candidates	Greens candidates	One Nation candidates	CDP candidates
1. **Sam Dastyari***; 2. **Jenny McAllister***; 3. **Deborah O'Neill***; 4. **Doug Cameron***; 5. Tara Moriarty; 6. Vivien Thomson; 7. Shuo Zhou; 8. Jagath Bandara; 9. Miriam Rizvi; 10. Mary O'Sullivan; 11. Paul Yi-Wen Han; 12. Alexandra Costello	1. **Marise Payne*** (Lib); 2. **Arthur Sinodinos*** (Lib); 3. **Fiona Nash*** (Nat); 4. **Concetta Fierravanti-Wells*** (Lib); 5. **John Williams*** (Nat); 6. Hollie Hughes (Lib); 7. Jim Molan (Lib); 8. Wes Fang (Nat); 9. Sang Ok (Lib); 10. Sarah Richards (Lib); 11. Fiona Leviny (Nat); 12. Victoria McGahey (Lib)	1. **Lee Rhiannon***; 2. Michael Osborne; 3. Jane Oakley; 4. Jananie Janarthana; 5. Marika Kontellis; 6. Gareth Bryant; 7. Christina Ho; 8. Kathryn Maiden; 9. Ray Goodlass; 10. Christine Donayre; 11. Kate Parker; 12. Sarah Fernandes	1. Brian Burston*; 2. Dean Mackin; 3. Christine Bernier	1. Nella Hall; 2. Peter Rahme; 3. Deborah Lions; 4. Andrew Phillips; 5. Tania Piper; 6. Beth Smith; 7. Dave Vincent; 8. Colin Broadbridge; 9. Rhonda Avasalu; 10. Archie Lea; 11. Lena El-Daghl; 12. Charles Knox
LDP candidates	ADVP candidates	AJP candidates	ALA candidates	AMEP candidates
1. **David Leyonhjelm***; 2. Sam Kennard	1. Raymond Bennie; 2. Mark Bradbury	1. Lynda Stoner; 2. Gordon Elkington	1. Kirralie Smith; 2. Gary Anderson	1. Rob Bryden; 2. Daniel Kirkness
Arts candidates	CEC candidates	CountryMinded candidates	DLP candidates	DLR candidates
1. Barry Keldoulis; 2. Nicholas Gledhill	1. Ann Lawler; 2. Robert Butler	1. Christopher Buckman; 2. Methuen Morgan	1. Paul McCormack; 2. Dawn Willis	1. Ray Thorpe; 2. Stacey Dowson
FFP candidates	HAP candidates	HEMP candidates	Hinch candidates	Katter candidates
1. Phil Jobe; 2. Sally Vincent; 3. Simon McCaffrey	1. Andrew Patterson; 2. Leanne Paff	1. Jason Olbourne; 2. Andrew Katelaris	1. Ken Stevens; 2. Adam Washbourne	1. Tom Harris; 2. Anthony Belcastro
Lambie candidates	Mature candidates	NCPP candidates	ODD candidates	Pirate candidates
1. Allan Thomas; 2. Bruce Relph; 3. Mitch Carr	1. Paul Quinn; 2. Gregory Frearson	1. Eric Greening; 2. Andy Thompson	1. Berge Der Sarkissian; 2. Arthur Emmett	1. Sam Kearns; 2. Darren McIntosh
Progressives candidates	PUP candidates	REP candidates	RUAP candidates	SA candidates
1. Allan Quartly; 2. Ash Rose	1. Suellen Wrightson; 2. Robert Marks; 3. Cara Donnelly	1. Peter Breen; 2. Susan Perrow	1. Brian Tucker; 2. Maree Nichols	1. Ken Canning; 2. Susan Price; 3. Sharlene Leroy-Dyer; 4. Howard Byrnes
Science/Cyclists candidates	Secular candidates	Seniors United candidates	SEP candidates	Sex Party candidates
1. James Jansson (Science); 2. Eve Slavich (Science); 3. Ingrid Ralph (Cyclists); 4. Jai Cooper (Cyclists)	1. Ian Bryce; 2. Dee Ellis	1. Gillian Evans; 2. Kerry Koliadis; 3. Chris Osborne	1. James Cogan; 2. John Davis	1. Ross Fitzgerald; 2. Sue Raye
SFF candidates	#Sustainable candidates	VEP candidates	VOTEFLUX candidates	Xenophon candidates
1. Karl Houseman; 2. Peter Johnson	1. William Bourke; 2. Greg Graham	1. Shayne Higson; 2. Janise Farrell	1. Steven Lopez; 2. Nathan Spataro	1. Aidan Dalgliesh; 2. Anthony Dona
Group G candidates	Ungrouped candidates			
1. Teresa van Lieshout; 2. Colin Bennett	Warren Grzic (Ind); Jane Ward (Ind); Liam Munday (Ind); Bryan Lambert (Ind); Peter Wallace (Ind)	James Wright (Ind); Joanna Rzetelski (Ind); Danny Lim (Ind); Maree Ann Cruze (AAP); Stephen Muller (Ind)	Peter Muller (Ind); John Cooper (Ind); Santa Spruce-Peet-Boyd (Ind); David Ash (Ind); Nigel Smith (Ind)	Ron Poulsen (-); Peter Gooley (Ind); Nick Chapman (Ind); Leonard Brown (Ind); Richelle Tsay (Ind)

=== Northern Territory ===
Two seats were up for election. The Labor Party was defending one seat. The Country Liberal Party was defending one seat.

Labor candidates	CLP candidates	Greens candidates	CDP candidates	CEC candidates
1. Malarndirri McCarthy*; 2. Pat Honan	1. **Nigel Scullion***; 2. Jenni Lillis	1. Michael Connard; 2. Kathy Bannister	1. Carol Ordish; 2. John Ordish	1. Trudy Campbell; 2. Ian Barry
HEMP/Sex Party candidates	RUAP candidates	Ungrouped candidates		
1. Andrew Kavasilas (HEMP); 2. Timothy Jones (Sex)	1. Jan Pile; 2. Jimmy Gimini	TS Lee (Ind); Tristan Marshall (ODD); Maurie Japarta Ryan (Ind)	Marney MacDonald (AAP); Greg Strettles (Ind)	

=== Queensland ===
Twelve seats were up for election. The Labor Party was defending four seats. The Liberal National Party was defending six seats. The Australian Greens were defending one seat. The Palmer United Party was defending one seat, although Senator Glenn Lazarus had left the party and was contesting for his Glenn Lazarus Team.

Labor candidates	LNP candidates	Greens candidates	One Nation candidates	Lazarus candidates
1. Murray Watt*; 2. Anthony Chisholm*; 3. **Claire Moore***; 4. **Chris Ketter***; 5. Jane Casey; 6. Cheryl Thompson	1. **George Brandis***; 2. **Matt Canavan***; 3. **James McGrath***; 4. **Ian Macdonald***; 5. **Barry O'Sullivan***; 6. **Joanna Lindgren**; 7. Dan Ryan; 8. Gerard Rennick	1. **Larissa Waters***; 2. Andrew Bartlett; 3. Ben Pennings; 4. Johanna Kloot; 5. Fiona Anderson; 6. Charles Worringham; 7. Rainee Skinner; 8. Janina Leo; 9. Meg Anderson; 10. Louise Noble; 11. Kirsten Kennedy; 12. Elena Quirk	1. Pauline Hanson*; 2. Malcolm Roberts*; 3. Fraser Anning; 4. Judy Smith	1. **Glenn Lazarus**; 2. Kerrod Walters; 3. Annette Lourigan
ADVP candidates	AJP candidates	ALA candidates	Arts candidates	CDP candidates
1. Jeremy Davey; 2. Darryl Hodkinson	1. Paul Bevan; 2. Zade Watson	1. Bernard Gaynor; 2. Alan Biggs; 3. Chelle Dobson	1. Frances Jankowski; 2. Neil Fainges	1. Wayne Solomon; 2. Ludy Sweeris-Sigrist
CEC candidates	Christians candidates	CountryMinded candidates	Cyclists candidates	DLP candidates
1. Jan Pukallus; 2. Stephen Harding	1. Shea Taylor; 2. Malcolm Brice	1. Pete Mailler; 2. Sherrill Stivano	1. Chris Cox; 2. Edward Re	1. Sheila Vincent; 2. Lucius Majoor
DLR candidates	Family First candidates	HAP candidates	Hinch candidates	Katter candidates
1. Deb Lynch; 2. Lorraine Smith	1. Rod McGarvie; 2. Sue Baynes; 3. Kate Horan; 4. David Pellowe	1. Jason Woodforth; 2. Sarinah Golden	1. Deb Cotter; 2. Karin Hanbidge	1. Rowell Walton; 2. Joy Marriott
Lambie candidates	LDP candidates	Mature candidates	MEP candidates	ODD candidates
1. Marcus Saltmarsh; 2. Crystal Peckett	1. Gabe Buckley; 2. John Rooth	1. Terry Snell; 2. Belinda Cameron	1. Marnie Southward; 2. William Moran	1. Peter Radic; 2. David Missingham
Pirate candidates	Progressives candidates	PUP candidates	REP candidates	RUAP candidates
1. Brandon Selic; 2. Isaac Pursehouse	1. Ken Stevens; 2. Jo McCormack	1. James McDonald; 2. Craig Gunnis	1. James Moylan; 2. MaryBeth Gundrum	1. Paul Taylor; 2. Neroli Mooney
Secular candidates	SEP candidates	Sex Party/HEMP candidates	SFF candidates	#Sustainable candidates
1. Trevor Bell; 2. Scott Clark	1. Mike Head; 2. Erin Cooke	1. Robin Bristow (Sex); 2. Therese Howes (HEMP); 3. Kirsty Patten (Sex)	1. Michael Turner; 2. Michael Gee	1. John Roles; 2. Matt Moran
VOTEFLUX candidates	Xenophon candidates	Group R candidates	Ungrouped candidates	
1. Mark Gardner; 2. Reece Flowers	1. Suzanne Grant; 2. Daniel Crow	1. Sal Rivas; 2. Val Tanguilig	Shyamal Reddy; Greg McMahon; David Bundy; Kim Vuga; Jim Savage; Tony Moore; Josephine Potter; Paul Stevenson; Marshal Anderson; Ian Eugarde	Julie Boyd; Leeanne Hanna-McGuffie; Zoemaree Harris; Michael Kaff; Terry Jorgensen; Gary Pead; John Gibson; Belinda Marriage; Greg Beattie

=== South Australia ===
Twelve seats were up for election. The Labor Party was defending three seats. The Liberal Party was defending five seats. The Australian Greens were defending two seats. The Family First Party was defending one seat. The Nick Xenophon Team was defending one seat.

Labor candidates	Liberal candidates	Greens candidates	NXT candidates	Family First candidates
1. **Penny Wong***; 2. Don Farrell*; 3. **Alex Gallacher***; 4. **Anne McEwen**; 5. Michael Allison; 6. Bronwyn Gallacher	1. **Simon Birmingham***; 2. **Cory Bernardi***; 3. **Anne Ruston***; 4. **David Fawcett***; 5. **Sean Edwards**; 6. Kerrynne Liddle	1. **Sarah Hanson-Young***; 2. **Robert Simms**; 3. Jody Moate; 4. Harriet de Kok	1. **Nick Xenophon***; 2. Stirling Griff*; 3. Skye Kakoschke-Moore*; 4. Tim Storer	1. **Bob Day***; 2. Lucy Gichuhi
One Nation candidates	AJP candidates	ALA candidates	AMEP candidates	Arts candidates
1. Steven Burgess; 2. Angelina Nicolis	1. Tania Noble; 2. Emma Breagan	1. Wanda Lee Marsh; 2. Andrew Horwood	1. Nathan Green; 2. Judith Kuerschner	1. Terence Crawford; 2. Charles Sanders
CDP candidates	CEC candidates	Cyclists candidates	HEMP/Sex Party candidates	Hinch candidates
1. Matt Attia; 2. Joseph Stephen	1. Alex Kozlow; 2. Paul Siebert	1. Sundance Bilson-Thompson; 2. Angus Harker-Smith	1. Ryan Parker (HEMP); 2. Margaret Saunders (Sex)	1. Lynn-Marie Grosser; 2. Colin Thomas
LDP candidates	Mature candidates	MEP candidates	Progressives candidates	PUP candidates
1. Roostam Sadri; 2. Michael Noack	1. Darryl Bothe; 2. Lyndal Denny	1. Adrian Tuazon-McCheyne; 2. Alex Bond	1. Sasha Pazeski-Nikoloski; 2. Jaz Priddey	1. Kristian Rees; 2. Carlo Filingeri
SFF candidates	VEP candidates	VOTEFLUX candidates	Ungrouped candidates	
1. John Hahn; 2. Nick Carter	1. Jessica Knight; 2. Kym Buckley	1. Adam Bird; 2. Jeff Baker	Ron Waters (AAP); Christopher Cochrane (Ind); Adam Richards (Ind)	Mohammad Ali (Ind); Dave Saddler (Ind); Malcolm Davey (Ind)

=== Tasmania ===
Twelve seats were up for election. The Labor Party was defending five seats. The Liberal Party was defending four seats. The Australian Greens were defending two seats. The Palmer United Party was defending one seat, although Senator Jacqui Lambie had left the party and contested for her Jacqui Lambie Network.

Labor candidates	Liberal candidates	Greens candidates	Lambie candidates	One Nation candidates
1. **Anne Urquhart***; 2. **Helen Polley***; 3. **Carol Brown***; 4. **Catryna Bilyk***; 5. John Short; 6. **Lisa Singh***	1. **Eric Abetz***; 2. **Stephen Parry***; 3. Jonathon Duniam*; 4. **David Bushby***; 5. **Richard Colbeck**; 6. John Tucker	1. **Peter Whish-Wilson***; 2. **Nick McKim***; 3. Anna Reynolds	1. **Jacqui Lambie***; 2. Steve Martin; 3. Rob Waterman	1. Kate McCulloch; 2. Natasia Manzi
AJP candidates	ALA candidates	ARFP candidates	Arts candidates	CDP candidates
1. Karen Bevis; 2. Alison Baker	1. Tony Robinson; 2. Susan Horwood	1. Kevin Harkins; 2. Carmen Evans	1. Scott O'Hara; 2. JoAnne Volta	1. Silvana Nero-Nile; 2. Mishka Gora
CEC candidates	Family First candidates	Hinch candidates	LDP candidates	PUP candidates
1. Meg Thornton; 2. Steve Kucina	1. Peter Madden; 2. Andrew Roberts	1. Suzanne Cass; 2. Daniel Baker	1. Clinton Mead; 2. Ian Alston	1. Kevin Morgan; 2. Justin Stringer; 3. Quentin Von Stieglitz
REP candidates	Science candidates	Sex Party/HEMP candidates	SFF candidates	VOTEFLUX candidates
1. Rob Manson; 2. Sharon Joyce	1. Hans Willink; 2. Jin-oh Choi	1. Francesca Collins (Sex); 2. Matt Owen (HEMP)	1. Matthew Allen; 2. Ricky Midson	1. Adam Poulton; 2. Max Kaye
Xenophon candidates	Ungrouped candidates			
1. Michelle Hoult; 2. Nicky Cohen	David Crawford (AAP); Kaye Marskell (Ind); Richard Temby (MAP)	Grant Russell (Ind); George Lane (Ind)		

=== Victoria ===
The Labor Party was defending four seats. The Liberal/National Coalition was defending four seats. The Australian Greens were defending two seats. The Motoring Enthusiast Party was defending one seat. The Democratic Labour Party was defending one seat, although Senator John Madigan had left the party and was running for his own Manufacturing and Farming Party.

Labor candidates	Coalition candidates	Greens candidates	Hinch candidates	AMEP candidates
1. **Kim Carr***; 2. **Stephen Conroy***; 3. **Jacinta Collins***; 4. **Gavin Marshall***; 5. Jennifer Yang; 6. Louise Persse; 7. Steve Kent; 8. Les Tarczon	1. **Mitch Fifield*** (Lib); 2. **Bridget McKenzie*** (Nat); 3. **Scott Ryan*** (Lib); 4. **James Paterson*** (Lib); 5. Jane Hume* (Lib); 6. Karina Okotel (Lib); 7. Rebecca Treloar (Nat)	1. **Richard Di Natale***; 2. **Janet Rice***; 3. Misha Coleman; 4. Elise Klein; 5. Anna Crabb; 6. James Searle; 7. Tasma Minifie; 8. Jennifer Alden; 9. Judy Cameron; 10. Gurm Sekhon; 11. Josephine Maguire-Rosier; 12. Rose Read	1. Derryn Hinch*; 2. Stuart Grimley	1. **Ricky Muir**; 2. Aaron Mackley
Madigan candidates	One Nation candidates	ACP candidates	AJP candidates	ALA candidates
1. **John Madigan**; 2. Mark George	1. Simon Roylance; 2. Ian Cameron	1. Garry Kerr; 2. Phil Larkin	1. Bruce Poon; 2. Jacqueline Edgecombe	1. Daniel Jones; 2. Kenneth Nicholls
Arts candidates	CDP candidates	CEC candidates	Christians candidates	DLP candidates
1. Rose Godde; 2. Jamie Henson; 3. Maureen Andrew	1. May Hanna; 2. Stephanie Botros	1. Craig Isherwood; 2. Gabrielle Peut	1. Vickie Janson; 2. Eleni Arapoglou; 3. Anne Okumu	1. Stephen Vereker; 2. Michael Freeman
DLR candidates	Family First candidates	HAP candidates	Lambie candidates	LDP candidates
1. Greg Chipp; 2. John Sherman	1. Peter Bain; 2. Randell Green; 3. Craig Manners	1. Isaac Golden; 2. Kathryn Breakwell	1. Hugh Dolan; 2. Matt Timson	1. Duncan Spender; 2. David Limbrick
Mature candidates	MEP candidates	Pirate candidates	Progressives candidates	PUP candidates
1. Graham McCarthy; 2. Roy Ridge	1. Jason Tuazon-McCheyne; 2. Jacqueline Tomlins	1. Lachlan Simpson; 2. Richard Burleigh	1. David Knight; 2. Josh Gilmore	1. Catriona Thoolen; 2. Cameron Hickey
REP candidates	RUAP candidates	SA candidates	Science/Cyclists candidates	Secular candidates
1. Graham Askey; 2. Gray Wilson	1. Danny Nalliah; 2. Rosalie Crestani	1. Lalitha Chelliah; 2. Tim Gooden	1. Luke James (Science); 2. Nik Dow (Cyclists)	1. John Perkins; 2. Alice Carr
SEP candidates	Sex Party candidates	SFF candidates	#Sustainable candidates	VEP candidates
1. Chris Sinnema; 2. Peter Byrne	1. Meredith Doig; 2. Amy Mulcahy	1. Jake Wilson; 2. Ethan Constantinou	1. Georgia Nicholls; 2. Steven Armstrong	1. David Scanlon; 2. Miranda Jones
VOTEFLUX candidates	Xenophon candidates	Group B candidates	Ungrouped candidates	
1. Danielle Lehrer; 2. Stuart Milne	1. Naomi Halpern; 2. Justin Lee	1. David Collyer; 2. Wanda Mitchell-Cook	Stephen Juhasz; Karthik Arasu; Dennis Hall; Dana Spasojevic; John Karagiannidis; Geoff Lutz; Allan Mull; Chris Ryan	Eric Vadarlis; Mark Dickenson; Immanuel Shmuel; Glenn Floyd; Meredith Urie; Trevor Nye; Peter Hawks; Christopher Beslis

=== Western Australia ===
Twelve seats were up for election. The Labor Party was defending three seats. The Liberal Party was defending six seats. The Australian Greens were defending two seats. The Palmer United Party was defending one seat.

Labor candidates	Liberal candidates	Greens candidates	One Nation candidates	Nationals candidates
1. **Sue Lines***; 2. **Glenn Sterle***; 3. **Pat Dodson***; 4. Louise Pratt*; 5. Mark Reed; 6. Susan Bowers; 7. Mia Onorato	1. **Mathias Cormann***; 2. **Michaelia Cash***; 3. **Dean Smith***; 4. **Linda Reynolds***; 5. **Chris Back***; 6. **David Johnston**; 7. Sheridan Ingram	1. **Scott Ludlam***; 2. **Rachel Siewert***; 3. Jordon Steele-John; 4. Samantha Jenkinson; 5. Michael Boldock; 6. Rai Ismail	1. Rod Culleton*; 2. Peter Georgiou; 3. Ioanna Culleton	1. Kado Muir; 2. Nick Fardell; 3. Elizabeth Re
PUP candidates	AFP candidates	AJP candidates	ALA candidates	Arts candidates
1. **Dio Wang**; 2. Jacque Kruger	1. Lyn Vickery; 2. Brian McRea	1. Katrina Love; 2. Alicia Sutton	1. Debbie Robinson; 2. Marion Hercock	1. Robert Buratti; 2. Robert Taylor
CDP candidates	CEC candidates	Christians candidates	Cyclists candidates	DLP candidates
1. Mark Imisides; 2. Philip Read	1. Jean Robinson; 2. Judy Sudholz	1. Lindsay Cameron; 2. Jacky Young	1. Peter Mah; 2. Christopher Howard	1. Fernando Bove; 2. Troy Kiernan
Family First candidates	HAP candidates	HEMP/Sex Party candidates	Hinch candidates	LDP candidates
1. Linda Rose; 2. Henry Heng	1. Samantha Tilbury; 2. Sara Fargher	1. Michael Balderstone (HEMP); 2. James Hurley (Sex)	1. Nicki Hide; 2. Rachael Higgins	1. Graeme Klass; 2. Connor Whittle
Mature candidates	REP candidates	RUAP candidates	SA candidates	SFF candidates
1. Stuart Donald; 2. Patti Bradshaw	1. Pedro Schwindt; 2. Camilla Sundbladh	1. Anthony Hardwick; 2. Sheila Mundy	1. Kamala Emanuel; 2. Seamus Doherty; 3. Farida Iqbal	1. Andrew Skerritt; 2. Ross Williamson
VOTEFLUX candidates	Xenophon candidates	Group V candidates	Ungrouped candidates	
1. Richard Thomas; 2. Mark Connolly	1. Luke Bolton; 2. Michael Bovell	1. Stuey Paull; 2. Gary Morris	Kai Jones (Ind); Tammara Moody (AAP); Julie Matheson (Ind)	Peter Castieau (Ind); Susan Hoddinott (KAP); Norm Ramsay (Ind)

== Summary by party ==
Beside each party is the number of seats contested by that party in the House of Representatives for each state, as well as an indication of whether the party contested the Senate election in the respective state.

Party	NSW		Vic		Qld		WA		SA		Tas		ACT		NT		Total	
Party	HR	S	HR	S	HR	S	HR	S	HR	S	HR	S	HR	S	HR	S	HR	S
Australian Labor Party	47	*	37	*	30	*	16	*	11	*	5	*	2	*	2	*	150	8
Liberal Party of Australia	38	*	35	*			16	*	11	*	5	*	2	*			107	6
Liberal National Party of Queensland					30	*											30	1
National Party of Australia	10	*	7	*			5	*									22	3
Country Liberal Party (NT)															2	*	2	1
Australian Greens	47	*	37	*	30	*	16	*	11	*	5	*	2	*	2	*	150	8
Family First Party	7	*	17	*	30	*		*	11	*		*					65	6
Christian Democratic Party	47	*		*		*		*	3	*	5	*		*		*	55	8
Animal Justice Party	9	*	26	*		*		*	6	*		*		*			41	7
Liberal Democratic Party	8	*	8	*	11	*	2	*	2	*	1	*		*	1		33	7
Rise Up Australia Party	1	*	18	*	3	*	7	*						*	2	*	31	6
Nick Xenophon Team	4	*	1	*	2	*		*	11	*		*					18	6
Australian Christians			6	*		*	12	*									18	3
Pauline Hanson's One Nation	3	*		*	12	*		*		*		*					15	6
Katter's Australian Party		*			12	*		*									12	3
Drug Law Reform Australia	2	*	7	*	2	*											11	3
Australian Liberty Alliance	4	*		*	5	*	1	*		*		*					10	6
Online Direct Democracy	6	*			2	*	1								1	*	10	3
Science Party	10	*		*								*					10	3
Renewable Energy Party	1	*	4	*		*		*			3	*					8	5
Citizens Electoral Council	3	*	2	*		*		*		*		*			2	*	7	7
Arts Party	3	*	1	*	2	*		*		*	1	*					7	6
Australian Sex Party	2	*	4	*		*		*		*		*		*		*	6	8
Shooters, Fishers and Farmers Party	1	*	1	*		*	2	*		*		*			2		6	6
Derryn Hinch's Justice Party	2	*	4	*		*		*		*		*					6	6
Mature Australia Party	1	*		*	1	*	2	*		*		*		*			4	7
Socialist Alliance	1	*	2	*			1	*									4	3
Australian Defence Veterans Party	1	*			3	*											4	2
Australia First Party	2		1					*							1		4	1
Bullet Train for Australia	1		1										2				4	
Democratic Labour Party	1	*		*	1	*		*			1						3	4
Socialist Equality Party	2	*	1	*		*											3	3
Australian Equality Party (Marriage)			3	*		*				*							3	3
Glenn Lazarus Team					3	*											3	1
Australian Recreational Fishers Party											3	*					3	1
Australian Country Party			3	1													3	1
Australian Cyclists Party	1	*	1	*		*		*		*							2	5
CountryMinded	1	*			1	*		*									2	3
Non-Custodial Parents Party	2																2	
HEMP Party		*				*		*		*		*			1	*	1	6
Palmer United Party		*		*	1	*		*		*		*					1	6
Australian Antipaedophile Party	1	*						*		*		*				*	1	5
#Sustainable Australia	1	*		*		*								*			1	4
Australian Progressives		*	1	*		*				*							1	4
Voluntary Euthanasia Party		*	1	*						*							1	3
Pirate Party Australia	1	*		*		*											1	3
Smokers' Rights Party	1																1	
Consumer Rights & No-Tolls					1												1	
Outdoor Recreation Party							1										1	
VOTEFLUX.ORG		*		*		*		*		*		*		*				7
Secular Party of Australia		*		*		*										*		4
Health Australia Party		*		*		*		*										4
Jacqui Lambie Network		*		*		*						*						4
Australian Motoring Enthusiast Party		*		*						*								3
Seniors United Party of Australia		*																1
John Madigan's Manufacturing and Farming Party				*														1
Independent and other	42	*	30	*	22	*	4	*	6	*	1	*	1		4	*	110	7
