= Results of the 2016 Australian federal election in Queensland =

2016 Australian federal election (Queensland)
← 2013	2 July 2016	2019 →

All 30 Queensland seats in the Australian House of Representatives and all 12 seats in the Australian Senate
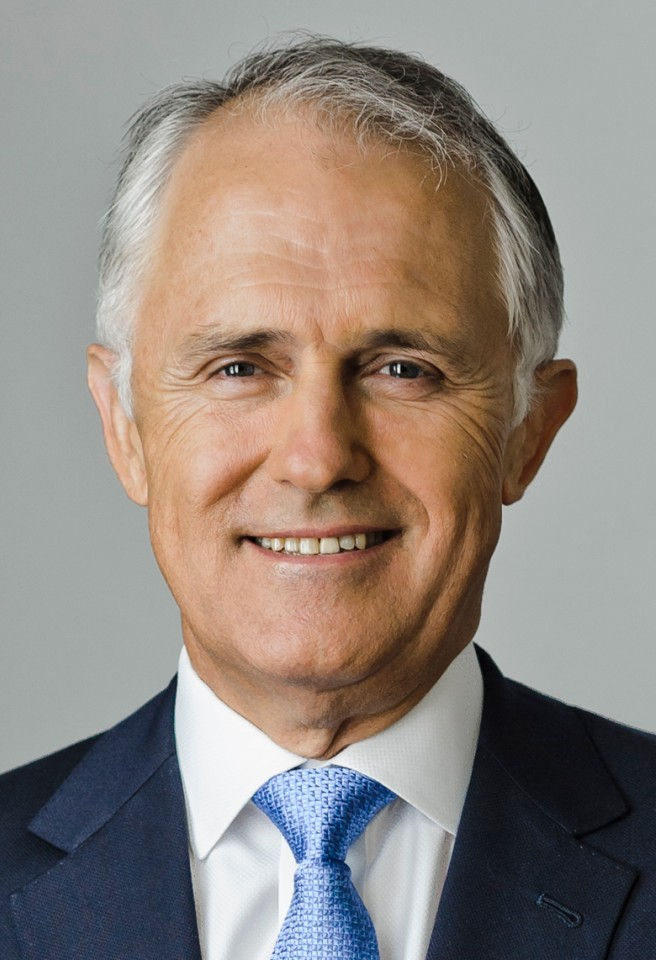

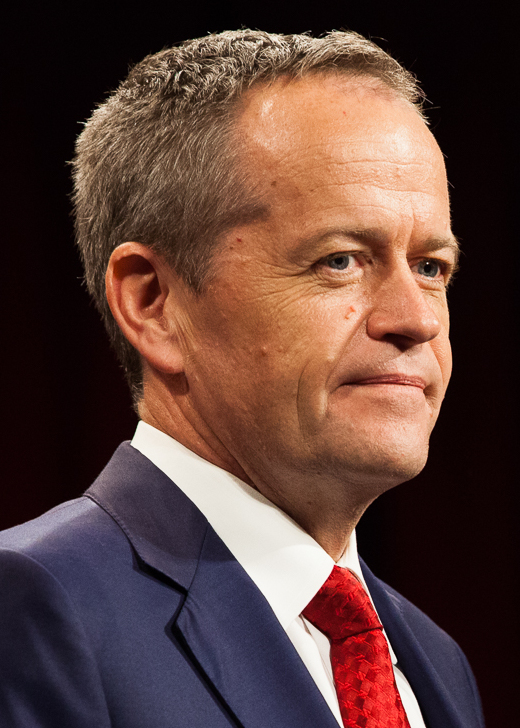

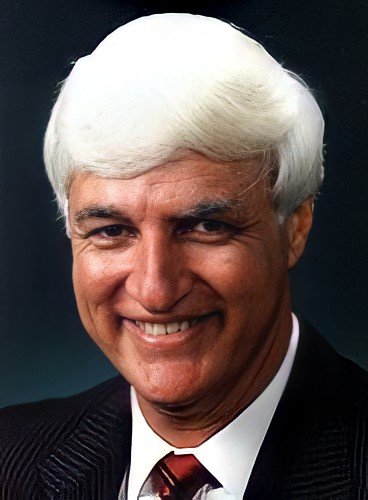
	First party	Second party	Third party
Leader	Malcolm Turnbull	Bill Shorten	Bob Katter
Party	Coalition	Labor	Katter's Australian
Leader since			3 June 2011
Leader's seat			Kennedy (Qld.)
Last election	22 seats	6 seats	1 seat
Seats won	21 seats	8 seats	1 seat
Seat change	▼1	▲2	Steady
Popular vote	1,153,736	825,627	72,879
Percentage	43.19%	30.91%	2.73%
Swing	▼2.47	▲1.14	▼1.02
TPP	54.10%	45.90%
TPP swing	▼2.88	▲2.88
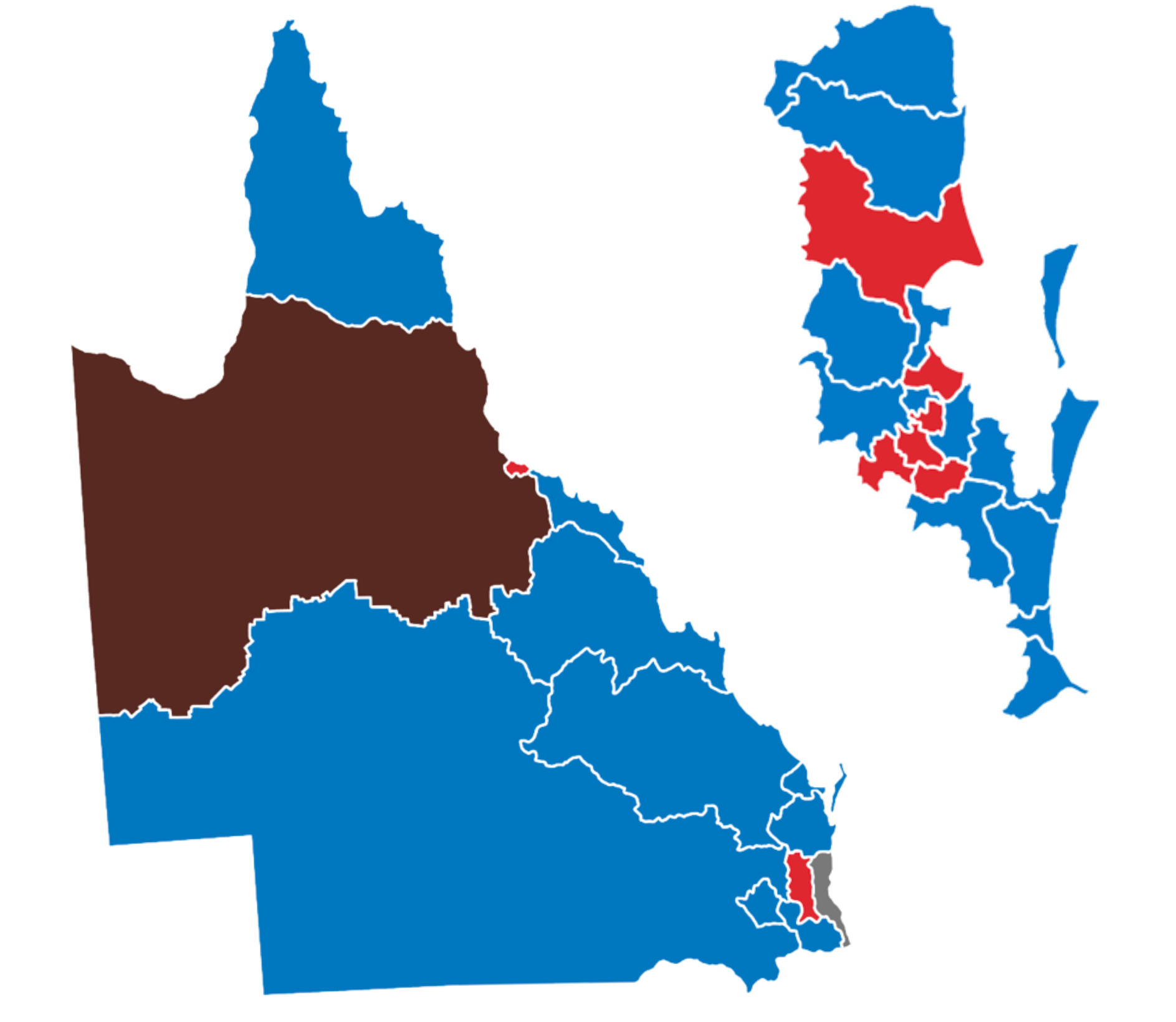
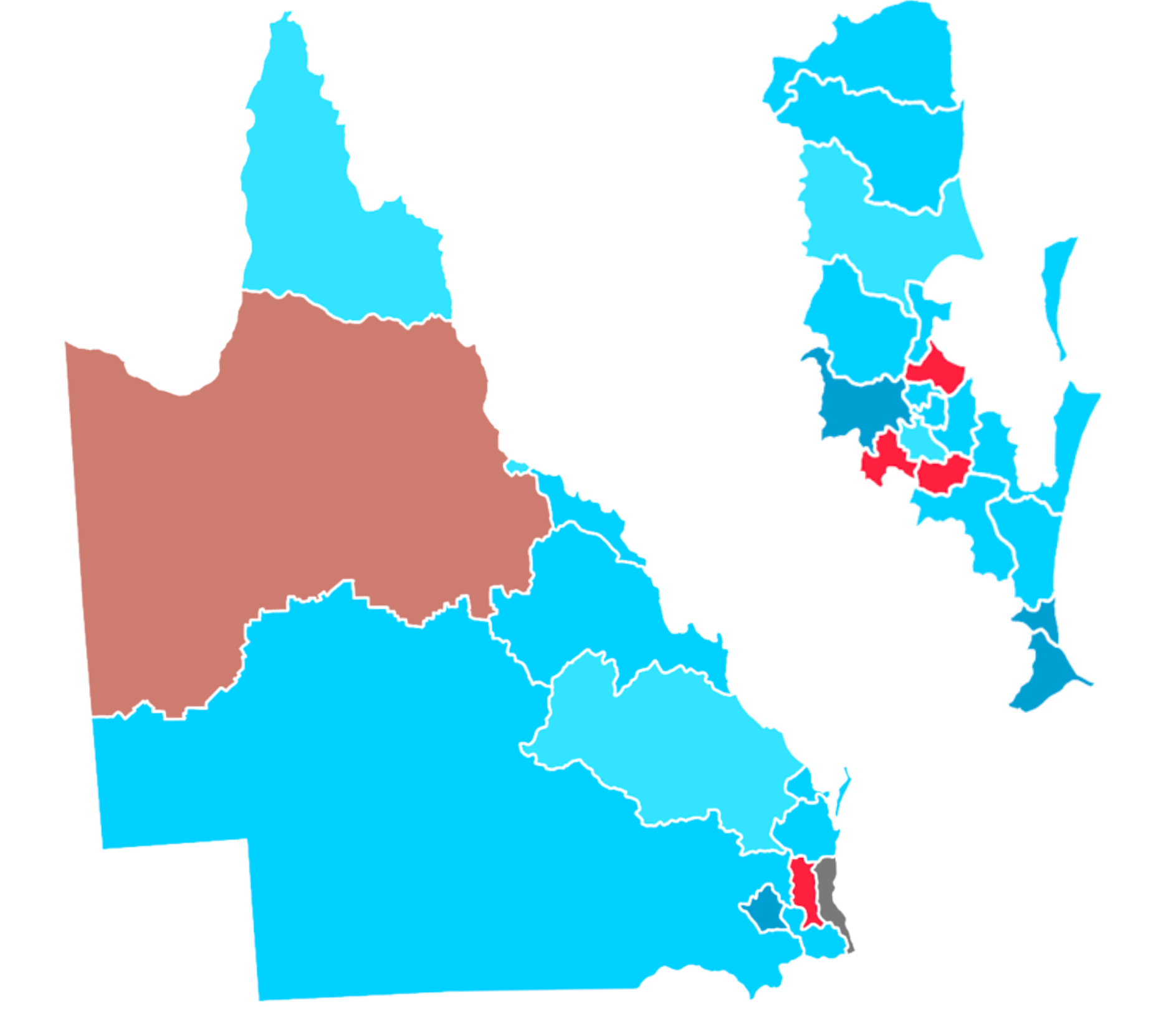
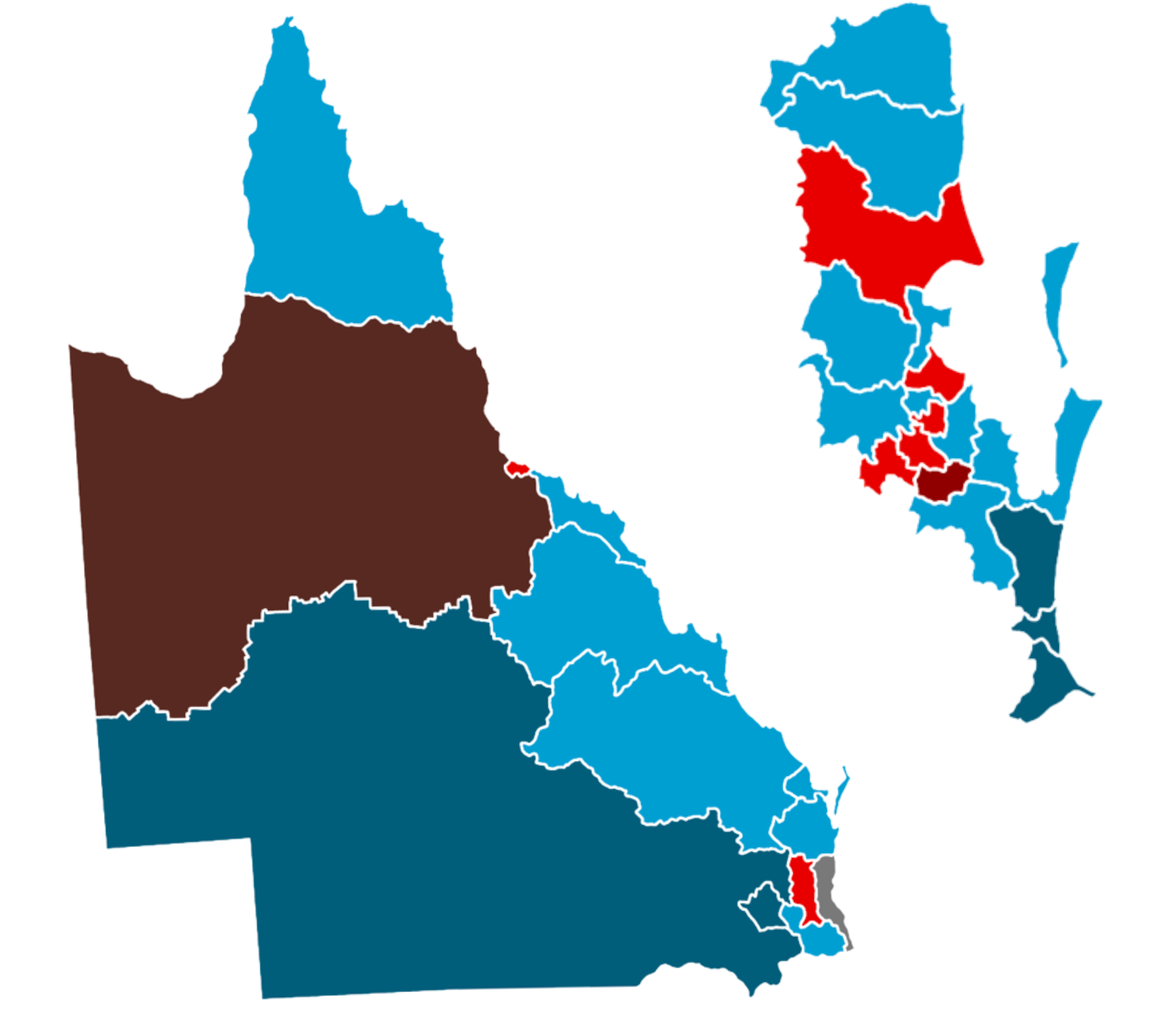

This is a list of electoral division results for the 2016 Australian federal election in the state of Queensland.

== Overall results ==
Party	Votes	%	Swing	Seats	Change
Liberal National Party	1,153,736	43.19	–2.47	21	▼1
Australian Labor Party	825,627	30.91	+1.14	8	▲2
Australian Greens	235,887	8.83	+2.61		
Pauline Hanson's One Nation	147,478	5.52	+5.42		
Family First Party	103,933	3.89	+1.85		
Katter's Australian Party	72,879	2.73	–1.02	1	0
Liberal Democratic Party	25,665	0.96	+0.96		
Australian Liberty Alliance	12,320	0.46	+0.46		
Nick Xenophon Team	11,032	0.41	+0.41		
Glenn Lazarus Team	10,094	0.38	+0.38		
Rise Up Australia Party	4,490	0.17	–0.22		
Drug Law Reform Australia	4,466	0.17	+0.17		
Australian Defence Veterans Party	2,912	0.11	+0.11		
CountryMinded	2,141	0.08	+0.08		
Consumer Rights & No-Tolls	2,050	0.08	+0.08		
Democratic Labour Party	1,566	0.06	+0.02		
The Arts Party	1,467	0.05	+0.05		
Online Direct Democracy	1,062	0.04	+0.04		
Mature Australia Party	902	0.03	+0.02		
Palmer United Party	315	0.01	−11.01	0	▼1
Independent	50,377	1.89	+1.51		
Non Affiliated	830	0.03	−0.12		
Total	2,671,229			30	
Two-party-preferred vote
Liberal National Party	1,445,030	54.10	−2.88	21	▼1
Australian Labor Party	1,226,199	45.90	+2.88	8	▲2

Liberal National to Labor: Herbert, Longman

Palmer to Liberal National: Fairfax

== Results by division ==
=== Blair ===
2016 Australian federal election: Blair
Party	Candidate	Votes	%	±%
Labor	Shayne Neumann	35,691	41.90	+0.35
Liberal National	Teresa Harding	24,455	28.71	−5.14
One Nation	Troy Aggett	13,273	15.58	+15.58
Greens	Pat Walsh	5,266	6.18	+1.93
Family First	Geoff Darr	2,406	2.82	−0.04
Independent	Sandy Turner	1,913	2.25	+2.25
Independent	Patricia Petersen	1,439	1.69	+1.69
Independent	Jonathan Emms	744	0.87	+0.87
Total formal votes		85,187	94.33	0.00
Informal votes		5,120	5.67	0.00
Turnout		90,307	91.81	−2.63
Two-party-preferred result
Labor	Shayne Neumann	50,158	58.88	+3.62
Liberal National	Teresa Harding	35,029	41.12	−3.62
Labor hold		Swing	+3.62	

=== Bonner ===
2016 Australian federal election: Bonner
Party	Candidate	Votes	%	±%
Liberal National	Ross Vasta	41,756	46.44	−0.36
Labor	Laura Fraser Hardy	31,344	34.86	−1.15
Greens	Ken Austin	8,518	9.47	+2.63
Family First	Andrew Broughton	3,157	3.51	+1.43
Liberal Democrats	Matthew Linney	2,738	3.05	+3.05
Independent	Jarrod Wirth	2,396	2.66	+2.66
Total formal votes		89,909	96.94	+1.28
Informal votes		2,838	3.06	−1.28
Turnout		92,747	92.01	−2.02
Two-party-preferred result
Liberal National	Ross Vasta	48,002	53.39	−0.30
Labor	Laura Fraser Hardy	41,907	46.61	+0.30
Liberal National hold		Swing	−0.30	

=== Bowman ===
2016 Australian federal election: Bowman
Party	Candidate	Votes	%	±%
Liberal National	Andrew Laming	45,946	49.77	+0.49
Labor	Kim Richards	29,592	32.05	+2.17
Greens	Brad Scott	9,012	9.76	+3.78
Family First	Brett Saunders	4,459	4.83	+2.68
Liberty Alliance	Tony Duncan	3,316	3.59	+3.59
Total formal votes		92,325	96.19	+0.70
Informal votes		3,654	3.81	−0.70
Turnout		95,979	92.78	−2.14
Two-party-preferred result
Liberal National	Andrew Laming	52,690	57.07	−1.79
Labor	Kim Richards	39,635	42.93	+1.79
Liberal National hold		Swing	−1.79	

=== Brisbane ===
2016 Australian federal election: Brisbane
Party	Candidate	Votes	%	±%
Liberal National	Trevor Evans	46,972	49.85	+1.86
Labor	Pat O'Neill	24,500	26.00	−4.12
Greens	Kirsten Lovejoy	18,279	19.40	+5.06
Liberal Democrats	John Humphreys	1,962	2.08	+2.08
Family First	Mark Vegar	1,597	1.69	+0.77
Defence Veterans	Bridget Clinch	915	0.97	+0.97
Total formal votes		94,225	97.61	+1.49
Informal votes		2,304	2.39	−1.49
Turnout		96,529	90.21	−2.52
Two-party-preferred result
Liberal National	Trevor Evans	52,693	55.92	+1.64
Labor	Pat O'Neill	41,532	44.08	−1.64
Liberal National hold		Swing	+1.64	

=== Capricornia ===
2016 Australian federal election: Capricornia
Party	Candidate	Votes	%	±%
Liberal National	Michelle Landry	35,310	40.05	+0.47
Labor	Leisa Neaton	33,579	38.09	+1.05
Katter's Australian	Laurel Carter	6,241	7.08	+1.54
Family First	Lindsay Temple	4,547	5.16	+1.30
Independent	Ken Murray	4,312	4.89	+4.89
Greens	Kate Giamarelos	4,166	4.73	+1.30
Total formal votes		88,155	96.45	+1.60
Informal votes		3,242	3.55	−1.60
Turnout		91,397	93.08	−1.75
Two-party-preferred result
Liberal National	Michelle Landry	44,633	50.63	−0.14
Labor	Leisa Neaton	43,522	49.37	+0.14
Liberal National hold		Swing	−0.14	

=== Dawson ===
2016 Australian federal election: Dawson
Party	Candidate	Votes	%	±%
Liberal National	George Christensen	38,474	42.61	−3.62
Labor	Frank Gilbert	29,608	32.79	+3.08
Katter's Australian	Ash Dodd	5,904	6.54	−0.20
Greens	Jonathon Dykyj	4,652	5.15	+0.13
Independent	Steven Large	4,184	4.63	+4.63
Glenn Lazarus Team	Michael Hall	4,075	4.51	+4.51
Family First	Amanda Nickson	3,403	3.77	+1.87
Total formal votes		90,300	95.45	+0.30
Informal votes		4,309	4.55	−0.30
Turnout		94,609	91.26	−2.56
Two-party-preferred result
Liberal National	George Christensen	48,167	53.34	−4.24
Labor	Frank Gilbert	42,133	46.66	+4.24
Liberal National hold		Swing	−4.24	

=== Dickson ===
2016 Australian federal election: Dickson
Party	Candidate	Votes	%	±%
Liberal National	Peter Dutton	40,519	44.56	−3.45
Labor	Linda Lavarch	31,769	34.94	+3.62
Greens	Michael Berkman	8,971	9.87	+3.45
Family First	Ray Hutchinson	3,868	4.25	+2.45
Independent	Thor Prohaska	3,217	3.54	+3.54
Liberal Democrats	Doug Nicholson	2,589	2.85	+2.85
Total formal votes		90,933	96.63	+0.89
Informal votes		3,172	3.37	−0.89
Turnout		94,105	93.47	−1.42
Two-party-preferred result
Liberal National	Peter Dutton	46,922	51.60	−5.12
Labor	Linda Lavarch	44,011	48.40	+5.12
Liberal National hold		Swing	−5.12	

=== Fadden ===
2016 Australian federal election: Fadden
Party	Candidate	Votes	%	±%
Liberal National	Stuart Robert	43,938	49.15	−4.46
Labor	Meaghan Scanlon	23,369	26.14	+3.92
One Nation	Brenden Ball	10,693	11.96	+11.32
Greens	Daniel Kwon	6,871	7.69	+2.70
Family First	Lyn Rees	3,450	3.86	+2.23
Defence Veterans	Sean Macnamara	1,083	1.21	+1.21
Total formal votes		89,404	95.47	+1.26
Informal votes		4,243	4.53	−1.26
Turnout		93,647	89.43	−3.27
Two-party-preferred result
Liberal National	Stuart Robert	54,578	61.05	−3.31
Labor	Meaghan Scanlon	34,826	38.95	+3.31
Liberal National hold		Swing	−3.31	

=== Fairfax ===
2016 Australian federal election: Fairfax
Party	Candidate	Votes	%	±%
Liberal National	Ted O'Brien	44,787	48.44	+7.12
Labor	Scott Anderson	19,054	20.61	+2.37
Greens	Susan Etheridge	11,672	12.62	+4.29
One Nation	Robert Pasquali	9,006	9.74	+8.90
Independent	Keith Campbell	2,886	3.12	+3.12
Family First	David Rees	2,449	2.65	+0.98
Independent	Robert Dickson	1,985	2.15	+2.15
Online Direct Democracy	Kris Bullen	624	0.67	+0.67
Total formal votes		92,463	93.77	−1.11
Informal votes		6,146	6.23	+1.11
Turnout		98,609	91.10	−2.29
Two-party-preferred result
Liberal National	Ted O'Brien	56,299	60.89	+10.92
Labor	Scott Anderson	36,164	39.11	+39.11
Liberal National gain from Palmer United		Swing	+10.92	

=== Fisher ===
2016 Australian federal election: Fisher
Party	Candidate	Votes	%	±%
Liberal National	Andrew Wallace	40,424	48.26	+3.79
Labor	Bill Gissane	20,670	24.68	+3.75
Greens	Tony Gibson	10,324	12.33	+4.73
Liberty Alliance	John Spellman	2,952	3.52	+3.52
Family First	Caroline Ashlin	2,927	3.49	+1.44
Ind. Whig	Mike Jessop	2,906	3.47	+3.47
Rise Up Australia	Tracey Bell-Henselin	2,210	2.64	+2.25
Defence Veterans	Jason Burgess	914	1.09	+1.09
Online Direct Democracy	LB Joum	438	0.52	+0.52
Total formal votes		83,765	93.15	−1.04
Informal votes		6,157	6.85	+1.04
Turnout		89,922	91.21	−2.31
Two-party-preferred result
Liberal National	Andrew Wallace	49,473	59.06	−0.69
Labor	Bill Gissane	34,292	40.94	+0.69
Liberal National hold		Swing	−0.69	

=== Flynn ===
2016 Australian federal election: Flynn
Party	Candidate	Votes	%	±%
Liberal National	Ken O'Dowd	32,293	37.06	−8.96
Labor	Zac Beers	29,094	33.39	−0.05
One Nation	Phil Baker	14,948	17.15	+17.15
Katter's Australian	Richard Love	2,948	3.38	−0.75
Greens	Craig Tomsett	2,416	2.77	+0.56
Family First	Heather Barnett	2,173	2.49	+0.99
Independent	Nathan Fletcher	1,927	2.21	+2.21
Independent	Duncan Scott	864	0.99	+0.06
Independent	Jordan Puku	483	0.55	+0.55
Total formal votes		87,146	93.81	−0.95
Informal votes		5,755	6.19	+0.95
Turnout		92,901	92.29	−2.36
Two-party-preferred result
Liberal National	Ken O'Dowd	44,480	51.04	−5.49
Labor	Zac Beers	42,666	48.96	+5.49
Liberal National hold		Swing	−5.49	

=== Forde ===
2016 Australian federal election: Forde
Party	Candidate	Votes	%	±%
Liberal National	Bert van Manen	34,096	40.63	−1.91
Labor	Des Hardman	31,587	37.64	+3.64
Greens	Sally Spain	5,393	6.43	+2.26
Independent	David Wilks	5,242	6.25	+6.25
Family First	Annelise Hellberg	4,687	5.59	+3.35
Liberty Alliance	Shaun Spain	2,905	3.46	+3.46
Total formal votes		83,910	94.93	+2.20
Informal votes		4,486	5.07	−2.20
Turnout		88,396	89.28	−3.32
Two-party-preferred result
Liberal National	Bert van Manen	42,486	50.63	−3.75
Labor	Des Hardman	41,424	49.37	+3.75
Liberal National hold		Swing	−3.75	

=== Griffith ===
2016 Australian federal election: Griffith
Party	Candidate	Votes	%	±%
Liberal National	Fiona Ward	37,716	41.00	−1.12
Labor	Terri Butler	30,524	33.18	−7.22
Greens	Karen Anderson	15,710	17.08	+6.83
Liberal Democrats	Bronwyn Ablett	1,880	2.04	+2.04
Drug Law Reform	John Jiggens	1,789	1.94	+1.94
Liberty Alliance	Matt Darragh	1,477	1.61	+1.61
Independent	Karel Boele	1,463	1.59	+1.59
Family First	Theresa Graham	1,424	1.55	+0.80
Total formal votes		91,983	95.94	+0.71
Informal votes		3,897	4.06	−0.71
Turnout		95,880	90.60	−2.54
Two-party-preferred result
Labor	Terri Butler	47,464	51.60	−1.50
Liberal National	Fiona Ward	44,519	48.40	+1.50
Labor hold		Swing	−1.50	

=== Groom ===
2016 Australian federal election: Groom
Party	Candidate	Votes	%	±%
Liberal National	John McVeigh	49,270	54.00	−1.64
Labor	Bronwyn Herbertson	20,259	22.20	+0.10
Family First	John Sands	9,140	10.02	+7.36
Xenophon	Josie Townsend	6,960	7.63	+7.63
Greens	Antonia van Geuns	5,618	6.16	+1.82
Total formal votes		91,247	96.43	+0.42
Informal votes		3,380	3.57	−0.42
Turnout		94,627	93.22	−1.35
Two-party-preferred result
Liberal National	John McVeigh	59,589	65.31	−1.16
Labor	Bronwyn Herbertson	31,658	34.69	+1.16
Liberal National hold		Swing	−1.16	

=== Herbert ===
2016 Australian federal election: Herbert
Party	Candidate	Votes	%	±%
Liberal National	Ewen Jones	31,361	35.50	−7.84
Labor	Cathy O'Toole	26,900	30.45	+1.07
One Nation	Geoff Virgo	11,950	13.53	+12.70
Katter's Australian	Colin Dwyer	6,070	6.87	−1.21
Greens	Wendy Tubman	5,533	6.26	+1.02
Family First	Michael Punshon	3,175	3.59	+2.29
Glenn Lazarus Team	Aaron Raffin	1,937	2.19	+2.19
Liberal Democrats	David Harris	1,096	1.24	+1.24
Palmer United	Martin Brewster	315	0.36	−8.52
Total formal votes		88,337	93.12	−0.95
Informal votes		6,525	6.88	+0.95
Turnout		94,862	90.50	−2.86
Two-party-preferred result
Labor	Cathy O'Toole	44,187	50.02	+6.19
Liberal National	Ewen Jones	44,150	49.98	−6.19
Labor gain from Liberal National		Swing	+6.19	

=== Hinkler ===
2016 Australian federal election: Hinkler
Party	Candidate	Votes	%	±%
Liberal National	Keith Pitt	38,887	43.86	−0.89
Labor	Tim Lawson	23,678	26.70	−0.90
One Nation	Damian Huxham	16,987	19.16	+19.16
Greens	Tim Roberts	3,477	3.92	+1.20
Family First	Stephen Lynch	2,250	2.54	+0.67
Independent	Bill Foster	1,720	1.94	+1.94
Liberty Alliance	Robert Windred	1,670	1.88	+1.88
Total formal votes		88,669	95.42	+0.34
Informal votes		4,258	4.58	−0.34
Turnout		92,927	92.29	−2.24
Two-party-preferred result
Liberal National	Keith Pitt	51,804	58.42	−0.62
Labor	Tim Lawson	36,865	41.58	+0.62
Liberal National hold		Swing	−0.62	

=== Kennedy ===
2016 Australian federal election: Kennedy
Party	Candidate	Votes	%	±%
Katter's Australian	Bob Katter	34,277	39.85	+10.49
Liberal National	Jonathan Pavetto	27,806	32.33	−8.51
Labor	Norm Jacobsen	16,480	19.16	+2.78
Greens	Valerie Weier	4,213	4.90	+1.66
Family First	Donna Gallehawk	3,234	3.76	+2.49
Total formal votes		86,010	96.18	+1.61
Informal votes		3,418	3.82	−1.61
Turnout		89,428	89.53	−2.73
Notional two-party-preferred count
Liberal National	Jonathan Pavetto	48,903	56.86	−10.29
Labor	Norm Jacobsen	37,107	43.14	+10.29
Two-candidate-preferred result
Katter's Australian	Bob Katter	52,570	61.12	+8.93
Liberal National	Jonathan Pavetto	33,440	38.88	−8.93
Katter's Australian hold		Swing	+8.93	

=== Leichhardt ===
2016 Australian federal election: Leichhardt
Party	Candidate	Votes	%	±%
Liberal National	Warren Entsch	35,066	39.49	−5.77
Labor	Sharryn Howes	24,939	28.08	−4.49
Greens	Kurt Pudniks	7,702	8.67	+2.08
One Nation	Peter Rogers	6,775	7.63	+7.63
Independent	Daniel McCarthy	6,096	6.86	+6.86
Katter's Australian	Brad Tassell	3,840	4.32	+0.03
Family First	Ned Kelly Gebadi	2,257	2.54	+0.35
Rise Up Australia	John Kelly	1,439	1.62	+1.06
Independent	Michael Newie	694	0.78	+0.78
Total formal votes		88,808	92.68	−1.87
Informal votes		7,012	7.32	+1.87
Turnout		95,820	87.85	−3.43
Two-party-preferred result
Liberal National	Warren Entsch	47,915	53.95	−1.73
Labor	Sharryn Howes	40,893	46.05	+1.73
Liberal National hold		Swing	−1.73	

=== Lilley ===
2016 Australian federal election: Lilley
Party	Candidate	Votes	%	±%
Labor	Wayne Swan	41,819	43.49	+3.28
Liberal National	David Kingston	37,545	39.05	−2.27
Greens	Claire Ogden	11,137	11.58	+3.91
Family First	Sharan Hall	3,451	3.59	+2.15
Liberal Democrats	Simon Holmick	2,202	2.29	+2.29
Total formal votes		96,154	97.08	+1.65
Informal votes		2,896	2.92	−1.65
Turnout		99,050	92.60	−1.65
Two-party-preferred result
Labor	Wayne Swan	53,190	55.32	+4.00
Liberal National	David Kingston	42,964	44.68	−4.00
Labor hold		Swing	+4.00	

=== Longman ===
2016 Australian federal election: Longman
Party	Candidate	Votes	%	±%
Liberal National	Wyatt Roy	34,359	39.01	−5.83
Labor	Susan Lamb	31,161	35.38	+4.73
One Nation	Michelle Pedersen	8,293	9.42	+9.42
Greens	Ian Bell	3,865	4.39	+0.45
Family First	Will Smith	3,002	3.41	+1.05
Drug Law Reform	Frances McDonald	2,677	3.04	+3.04
Katter's Australian	Brad Kennedy	1,597	1.81	−1.01
Independent	Greg Riddell	1,111	1.26	+1.26
Independent	Rob Law	945	1.07	+1.07
	Caleb Wells	830	0.94	−0.13
Arts	Stephen Beck	228	0.26	+0.26
Total formal votes		88,068	91.47	−3.46
Informal votes		8,217	8.53	+3.46
Turnout		96,285	91.68	−2.17
Two-party-preferred result
Labor	Susan Lamb	44,729	50.79	+7.71
Liberal National	Wyatt Roy	43,339	49.21	−7.71
Labor gain from Liberal National		Swing	+7.71	

=== Maranoa ===
2016 Australian federal election: Maranoa
Party	Candidate	Votes	%	±%
Liberal National	David Littleproud	44,297	49.19	−8.23
Labor	Dave Kerrigan	16,456	18.27	+1.98
One Nation	Lynette Keehn	16,047	17.82	+17.82
Katter's Australian	Rick Gurnett	4,306	4.78	−0.81
Greens	Katherine Hompes	3,056	3.39	+0.32
Family First	Myfanwy Schenk	2,905	3.23	+0.47
CountryMinded	Luke Arbuckle	2,141	2.38	+2.38
Rise Up Australia	Sherrilyn Church	841	0.93	−0.03
Total formal votes		90,049	94.47	−1.14
Informal votes		5,269	5.53	+1.14
Turnout		95,318	92.74	−1.66
Notional two-party-preferred count
Liberal National	David Littleproud	60,821	67.54	−4.74
Labor	Dave Kerrigan	29,228	32.46	+4.74
Two-candidate-preferred result
Liberal National	David Littleproud	59,308	65.86	−6.42
One Nation	Lynette Keehn	30,741	34.14	+34.14
Liberal National hold		Swing	N/A	

=== McPherson ===
2016 Australian federal election: McPherson
Party	Candidate	Votes	%	±%
Liberal National	Karen Andrews	47,284	53.29	+3.13
Labor	Sandy Gadd	23,069	26.00	+3.25
Greens	Peter Burgoyne	9,119	10.28	+3.42
Family First	Simon Green	5,404	6.09	+2.37
Independent	Rob Jones	3,850	4.34	+4.34
Total formal votes		88,726	95.53	+0.74
Informal votes		4,151	4.47	−0.74
Turnout		92,877	89.51	−3.10
Two-party-preferred result
Liberal National	Karen Andrews	54,687	61.64	−1.36
Labor	Sandy Gadd	34,039	38.36	+1.36
Liberal National hold		Swing	−1.36	

=== Moncrieff ===
2016 Australian federal election: Moncrieff
Party	Candidate	Votes	%	±%
Liberal National	Steven Ciobo	50,688	58.97	+3.28
Labor	Hayden Sheppard	20,956	24.38	+3.56
Greens	Roger Brisbane	8,697	10.12	+3.67
Family First	Julie Rose	5,619	6.54	+4.35
Total formal votes		85,960	95.54	+1.27
Informal votes		4,011	4.46	−1.27
Turnout		89,971	87.37	−3.68
Two-party-preferred result
Liberal National	Steven Ciobo	55,824	64.94	−3.01
Labor	Hayden Sheppard	30,136	35.06	+3.01
Liberal National hold		Swing	−3.01	

=== Moreton ===
2016 Australian federal election: Moreton
Party	Candidate	Votes	%	±%
Liberal National	Nic Monsour	32,103	37.79	−4.45
Labor	Graham Perrett	31,342	36.90	−1.83
Greens	Kristen Lyons	10,812	12.73	+2.74
Xenophon	Des Soares	4,072	4.79	+4.79
Liberal Democrats	Andrew Cooper	2,783	3.28	+3.28
Family First	Florian Heise	2,507	2.95	+1.43
Katter's Australian	Shan-Ju Lin	1,329	1.56	+0.26
Total formal votes		84,948	95.89	+1.51
Informal votes		3,641	4.11	−1.51
Turnout		88,589	90.60	−2.07
Two-party-preferred result
Labor	Graham Perrett	45,892	54.02	+2.47
Liberal National	Nic Monsour	39,056	45.98	−2.47
Labor hold		Swing	+2.47	

=== Oxley ===
2016 Australian federal election: Oxley
Party	Candidate	Votes	%	±%
Labor	Milton Dick	38,419	46.09	+2.99
Liberal National	Bibe Roadley	26,744	32.08	−6.36
Greens	Steven Purcell	7,305	8.76	+3.38
One Nation	Brad Trussell	7,023	8.42	+8.42
Family First	Carrie McCormack	2,734	3.28	+1.23
Katter's Australian	Stephen Lacaze	1,136	1.36	−0.62
Total formal votes		83,361	95.99	+2.91
Informal votes		3,484	4.01	−2.91
Turnout		86,845	91.42	−2.13
Two-party-preferred result
Labor	Milton Dick	49,250	59.08	+5.31
Liberal National	Bibe Roadley	34,111	40.92	−5.31
Labor hold		Swing	+5.31	

=== Petrie ===
2016 Australian federal election: Petrie
Party	Candidate	Votes	%	±%
Liberal National	Luke Howarth	41,475	44.70	+4.05
Labor	Jacqui Pedersen	35,616	38.38	−1.14
Greens	Sue Weber	6,840	7.37	+2.85
Family First	Mark White	4,746	5.11	+2.96
Liberal Democrats	Catherine Buckley	2,877	3.10	+3.10
Arts	Andrew Tyrrell	1,239	1.34	+1.34
Total formal votes		92,793	95.98	+1.18
Informal votes		3,886	4.02	−1.18
Turnout		96,679	91.73	−1.96
Two-party-preferred result
Liberal National	Luke Howarth	47,926	51.65	+1.12
Labor	Jacqui Pedersen	44,867	48.35	−1.12
Liberal National hold		Swing	+1.12	

=== Rankin ===
2016 Australian federal election: Rankin
Party	Candidate	Votes	%	±%
Labor	Jim Chalmers	42,147	49.34	+7.16
Liberal National	Freya Ostapovitch	24,455	28.63	−7.74
Greens	Neil Cotter	5,373	6.29	+1.00
Family First	Christopher Lawrie	5,011	5.87	+2.85
Liberal Democrats	Ric Davies	3,513	4.11	+4.11
Katter's Australian	Shane Holley	2,874	3.36	+1.32
Consumer Rights	Jeffrey Hodges	2,050	2.40	+2.40
Total formal votes		85,423	94.24	+0.80
Informal votes		5,225	5.76	−0.80
Turnout		90,648	89.13	−3.13
Two-party-preferred result
Labor	Jim Chalmers	52,362	61.30	+6.52
Liberal National	Freya Ostapovitch	33,061	38.70	−6.52
Labor hold		Swing	+6.52	

=== Ryan ===
2016 Australian federal election: Ryan
Party	Candidate	Votes	%	±%
Liberal National	Jane Prentice	49,402	52.13	+0.45
Labor	Stephen Hegedus	21,594	22.79	−2.72
Greens	Sandra Bayley	17,767	18.75	+4.31
Family First	David Todd	2,389	2.52	+1.20
Liberal Democrats	Sly Gryphon	2,046	2.16	+2.16
Democratic Labour	John Quinn	1,566	1.65	+1.65
Total formal votes		94,764	97.61	+0.86
Informal votes		2,318	2.39	−0.86
Turnout		97,082	92.43	−1.69
Two-party-preferred result
Liberal National	Jane Prentice	55,994	59.09	+0.55
Labor	Stephen Hegedus	38,770	40.91	−0.55
Liberal National hold		Swing	+0.55	

=== Wide Bay ===
2016 Australian federal election: Wide Bay
Party	Candidate	Votes	%	±%
Liberal National	Llew O'Brien	39,373	43.80	−5.07
Labor	Lucy Stanton	20,301	22.58	+1.87
One Nation	Elise Cottam	14,022	15.60	+15.60
Greens	Bron Marsh	7,355	8.18	+1.63
Glenn Lazarus Team	Jannean Dean	4,082	4.54	+4.54
Family First	Bruce Mayer	2,399	2.67	+1.17
Katter's Australian	Barry Cook	2,357	2.62	−3.26
Total formal votes		89,889	95.00	−0.32
Informal votes		4,728	5.00	+0.32
Turnout		94,617	91.99	−2.22
Two-party-preferred result
Liberal National	Llew O'Brien	52,264	58.14	−5.02
Labor	Lucy Stanton	37,625	41.86	+5.02
Liberal National hold		Swing	−5.02	

=== Wright ===
2016 Australian federal election: Wright
Party	Candidate	Votes	%	±%
Liberal National	Scott Buchholz	36,935	41.82	−6.02
Labor	Allistair Smith	20,110	22.77	+1.38
One Nation	Rod Smith	18,461	20.90	+20.90
Greens	Pietro Agnoletto	6,768	7.66	+2.26
Family First	Barry Austin	3,163	3.58	+1.00
Liberal Democrats	Mark Stone	1,979	2.24	+2.24
Mature Australia	John Cox	902	1.02	+1.02
Total formal votes		88,318	95.69	+0.72
Informal votes		3,980	4.31	−0.72
Turnout		92,298	92.33	−1.74
Two-party-preferred result
Liberal National	Scott Buchholz	52,651	59.62	−2.22
Labor	Allistair Smith	35,667	40.38	+2.22
Liberal National hold		Swing	−2.22	
