= Results of the 2016 Australian federal election in Tasmania =

2016 Australian federal election (Tasmania)
- 2 July 2016

All 5 Tasmanian seats in the Australian House of Representatives and all 12 seats in the Australian Senate
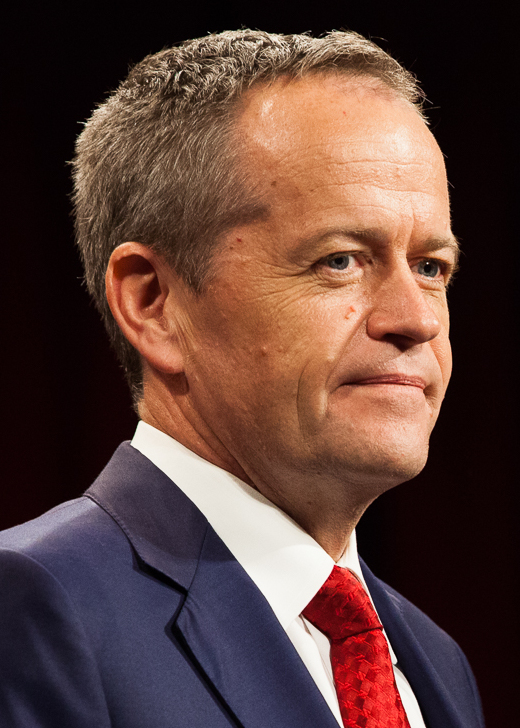

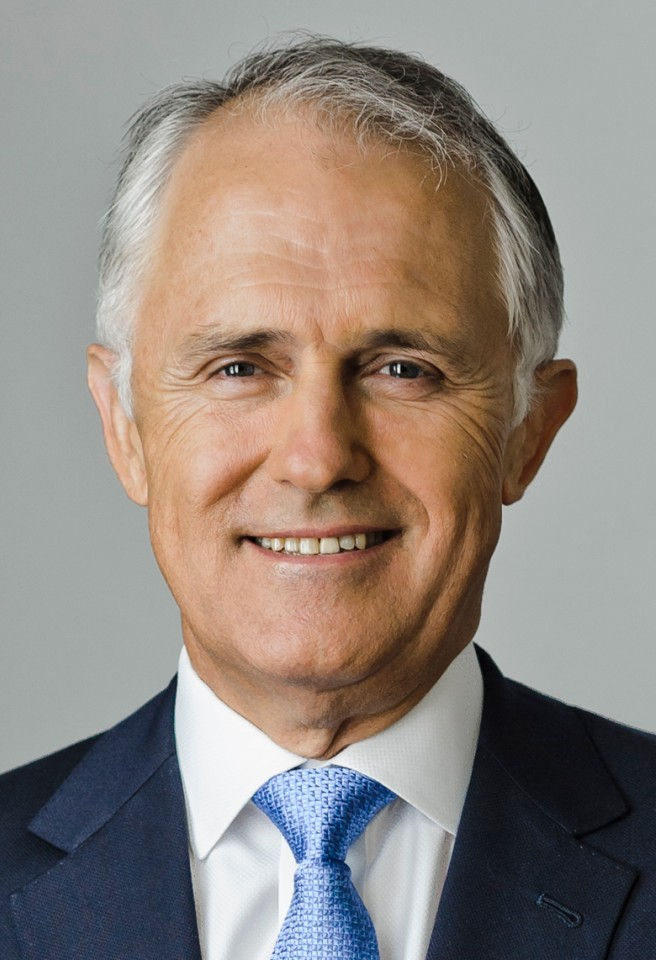
	First party	Second party
Leader	Bill Shorten	Malcolm Turnbull
Party	Labor	Liberal
Last election	1 seat	3 seats
Seats won	4 seats	0 seats
Seat change	▲3	▼3
Popular vote	127,186	118,956
Percentage	37.90%	35.44%
Swing	▲3.09	▼4.82
TPP	57.36%	42.64%
TPP swing	▲6.13	▼6.13
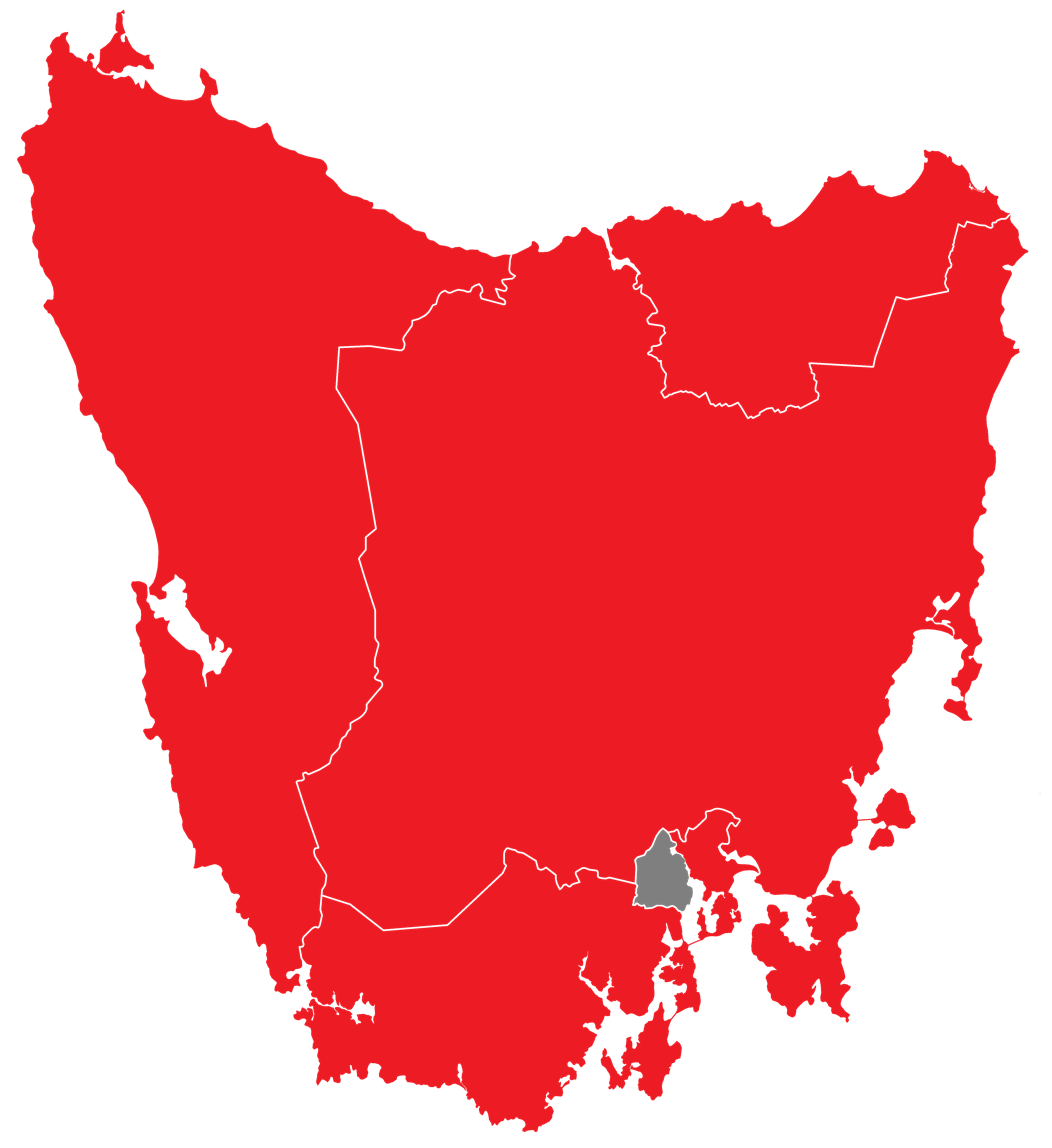

This is a list of electoral division results for the 2016 Australian federal election in the state of Tasmania.

== Overall results ==
Party	Votes	%	Swing	Seats	Change
Australian Labor Party	127,186	37.90	+3.09	4	▲3
Liberal Party of Australia	118,956	35.44	–4.82	0	▼3
Australian Greens	34,291	10.22	+1.90		
Australian Recreational Fishers Party	11,254	3.35	+3.35		
Christian Democratic Party	6,345	1.89	+1.89		
Renewable Energy Party	4,534	1.35	+1.35		
The Arts Party	1,673	0.50	+0.50		
Liberal Democratic Party	1,380	0.41	+0.41		
Democratic Labour Party	632	0.19	+0.02		
Independent	29,372	8.75	+1.28	1	Steady
Total	335,623			5	
Two-party-preferred vote
Australian Labor Party	192,530	57.36	+6.13	4	▲3
Liberal Party of Australia	143,093	42.64	−6.13	0	▼3
Source: AEC for both and

Liberal to Labor: Bass, Braddon, Lyons

== Results by division ==
=== Bass ===
2016 Australian federal election: Bass
Party	Candidate	Votes	%	±%
Labor	Ross Hart	26,803	40.50	+5.85
Liberal	Andrew Nikolic	25,609	38.70	−9.15
Greens	Terrill Riley-Gibson	7,154	10.81	+2.91
Recreational Fishers	Mark Tapsell	3,231	4.88	+4.88
Christian Democrats	Malcolm Beattie	1,765	2.67	+2.67
Renewable Energy	Roy Ramage	1,613	2.44	+2.44
Total formal votes		66,175	96.04	+0.22
Informal votes		2,729	3.96	−0.22
Turnout		68,904	93.68	−0.74
Two-party-preferred result
Labor	Ross Hart	37,119	56.09	+10.13
Liberal	Andrew Nikolic	29,056	43.91	−10.13
Labor gain from Liberal		Swing	+10.13	

=== Braddon ===
2016 Australian federal election: Braddon
Party	Candidate	Votes	%	±%
Liberal	Brett Whiteley	26,841	41.50	−5.36
Labor	Justine Keay	25,898	40.05	+2.46
Greens	Scott Jordan	4,358	6.74	+1.57
Recreational Fishers	Glen Saltmarsh	3,701	5.72	+5.72
Liberal Democrats	Joshua Boag	1,380	2.13	+2.13
Renewable Energy	Clinton Rice	1,343	2.08	+2.08
Christian Democrats	Graham Hodge	1,151	1.78	+1.78
Total formal votes		64,672	94.77	−1.68
Informal votes		3,568	5.23	+1.68
Turnout		68,240	94.09	−1.26
Two-party-preferred result
Labor	Justine Keay	33,759	52.20	+4.76
Liberal	Brett Whiteley	30,913	47.80	−4.76
Labor gain from Liberal		Swing	+4.76	

=== Denison ===
2016 Australian federal election: Denison
Party	Candidate	Votes	%	±%
Independent	Andrew Wilkie	29,372	44.07	+5.99
Labor	Jane Austin	15,335	23.01	−1.74
Liberal	Marcus Allan	13,267	19.90	−3.33
Greens	Jen Brown	7,068	10.60	+2.68
Christian Democrats	Amanda Excell	980	1.47	+1.47
Democratic Labour	Wayne Williams	632	0.95	+0.10
Total formal votes		66,654	97.08	+1.30
Informal votes		2,002	2.92	−1.30
Turnout		68,656	92.82	−1.44
Notional two-party-preferred count
Labor	Jane Austin	43,550	65.34	+6.43
Liberal	Marcus Allan	23,104	34.66	−6.43
Two-candidate-preferred result
Independent	Andrew Wilkie	45,176	67.78	+2.27
Labor	Jane Austin	21,478	32.22	−2.27
Independent hold		Swing	+2.27	

=== Franklin ===
2016 Australian federal election: Franklin
Party	Candidate	Votes	%	±%
Labor	Julie Collins	32,724	47.01	+7.08
Liberal	Amanda-Sue Markham	24,542	35.26	−3.45
Greens	Martine Delaney	9,293	13.35	+1.17
Arts	Tim Sanderson	1,673	2.40	+2.40
Christian Democrats	George Muskett	1,375	1.98	+1.98
Total formal votes		69,607	96.60	+0.37
Informal votes		2,453	3.40	−0.37
Turnout		72,060	93.85	−1.24
Two-party-preferred result
Labor	Julie Collins	42,264	60.72	+5.63
Liberal	Amanda-Sue Markham	27,343	39.28	−5.63
Labor hold		Swing	+5.63	

=== Lyons ===
2016 Australian federal election: Lyons
Party	Candidate	Votes	%	±%
Liberal	Eric Hutchinson	28,697	41.88	−2.51
Labor	Brian Mitchell	26,426	38.57	+1.75
Greens	Hannah Rubenach-Quinn	6,418	9.37	+1.05
Recreational Fishers	Shelley Shay	4,322	6.31	+6.31
Renewable Energy	Duncan Livingston	1,578	2.30	+2.30
Christian Democrats	Gene Mawer	1,074	1.57	+1.57
Total formal votes		68,515	95.57	+0.03
Informal votes		3,174	4.43	−0.03
Turnout		71,689	93.54	−0.99
Two-party-preferred result
Labor	Brian Mitchell	35,838	52.31	+3.53
Liberal	Eric Hutchinson	32,677	47.69	−3.53
Labor gain from Liberal		Swing	+3.53	
