= Science Party (Australia) =

Australian political party

- Leader: Andrea Leong
- Deputy leader: Aaron Hammond
- Founded: 2 July 2013; 13 years ago
- Headquarters: New South Wales
- Ideology: Bright green environmentalism Secularism; Techno-progressivism; Technocentrism; Australian republicanism
- National affiliation: Fusion Party
- Colours: Sky blue

Website
- scienceparty.org.au

The Science Party, formerly known as Future Party, is an Australian political party that was established on 2 July 2013. The founding leader, James Jansson, was studying for his doctorate at the Kirby Institute during the party's formation, with a focus on advancing Australian society through technical and long-term solutions. On 22 March 2016, the name was changed to The Science Party after registering with the Australian Electoral Commission. The Science Party has run candidates for the 2013, 2016 and 2019 federal elections, as well as several by-elections in between.

The party was de-registered on 12 January 2022 by the Australian Electoral Commission for failing to meet the increased registration requirement of 1,500 members. It later merged with other parties to become the Fusion Party.

== Political philosophy ==
The Science Party believes that technological development is a positive force in human affairs and values the cultural, economic and technological benefits of modernism. It believes in freedom of expression and has a positive view of the power of free markets and the benefits of high density cities. The party seeks to promote high quality science research and education.

=== Policies ===
Science Party policies include the following:

- Opposition to unnecessary regulations of new technology
- Opposition to government monitoring of data and criminalisation of journalism
- Greater transparency and openness in government
- Increased science research funding
- New charter city including a university
- Higher density residential development
- High quality internet and internet freedom
- Nuclear fusion and fission research
- Emissions trading and renewable energy
- Greater space research and industry
- A higher quality education system
- An Australian republic
- Democratic reform to both houses of parliament
- Simplified tax system
- High-speed rail
- Rapid approval for driverless cars
- Banning of underage circumcision and female genital mutilation

== Elections ==
=== Federal elections ===
==== 2013 federal election ====
The Science Party first ran in the 2013 federal election as The Future Party. The party ran two candidates for the senate in NSW, and one in the New South Wales seat of Kingsford Smith and another in the Queensland seat of Moreton The party has been involved in Glenn Druery's Minor Party Alliance, though it refused to engage in any large scale preference deal.

==== 2016 federal election ====
In the 2016 federal election, the Science Party fielded two candidates each for the senate in NSW and Tasmania and one in Victoria. To avoid being placed in the ungrouped column, the Victorian and NSW candidates shared the column with the candidate from the Australian Cyclists Party. Together, they received 0.22% of the vote in Australia; 0.41% in NSW, 0.33% in Victoria, and without a shared column in Tasmania, received 0.39% of the vote.

For the House of Representatives, ten candidates ran in NSW: Berowra (receiving 2.1% of votes), Cunningham (2.6%), Grayndler (1.3%), Greenway (1%), Kingsford Smith (2.2%), North Sydney(1.8%), Sydney (1.6%), Warringah (0.9%), Watson (1.9%) and Wentworth (1.2%).

==== 2019 federal election ====
In 2019, four candidates ran for senate in NSW, receiving 0.4% of the total vote. In the lower house, five candidates from NSW were put forward and the results were: Berowra (1.56% of votes), Grayndler: (2.73%), Kingsford Smith (1.69%), Sydney (3.42%), Watson (2.23%), as well as one from VIC (Mallee, 0.53%) and one from WA (Perth, 1.52%).

=== By-elections ===
2015 By-election: James Jansson ran under the title of The Future Party for North Sydney in NSW.

2017 and 2018 By-elections: The Science Party fielded Meow-Ludo Meow-Meow as a candidate in the 2017 New England by-election in response to the 2017–2018 Australian parliamentary eligibility crisis. He had previously been the Science Party candidate in the Division of Grayndler at the 2016 federal election. After subsequent resignations, the party fielded candidates in by-elections for the seats of Bennelong, Perth, Longman and Wentworth.

2020 By-election: James Jansson ran in Eden-Monaro (NSW) for the 2020 By-election, receiving 1.13% of the vote.

== Electoral results ==
Senate (NSW)
Election year	Leader	# of total votes	% of total votes	Name of party (at time of poll)
2013	James Jansson	4,243	0.10	Future Party
2016	James Jansson	18,367	▲0.41	Science Party (on a joint ticket with the Australian Cyclists Party)
2019	Andrea Leong	18,972	▼0.40	Science Party

== See also ==
- Candidates of the 2013 Australian federal election
- Candidates of the 2016 Australian federal election
- Candidates of the 2019 Australian federal election
- List of political parties in Australia
