= 2015 Canning by-election =

Australian federal by-election

- 19 September 2015

The Canning seat in the House of Representatives
- Registered: 112,809
- Turnout: 79.53% ▼12.48
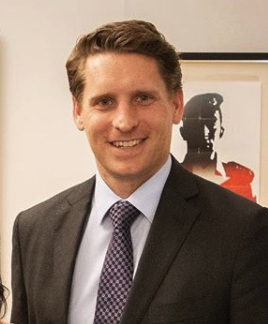

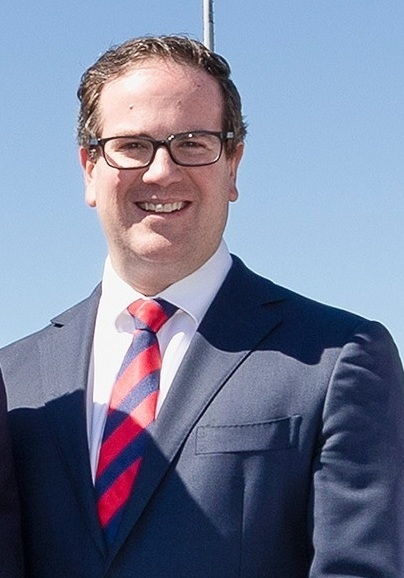
	First party	Second party
Candidate	Andrew Hastie	Matt Keogh
Party	Liberal	Labor
Popular vote	39,712	30,096
Percentage	46.92%	35.56%
Swing	▼4.15	▲8.92
TPP	55.26%	44.74%
TPP swing	▼6.55	▲6.55
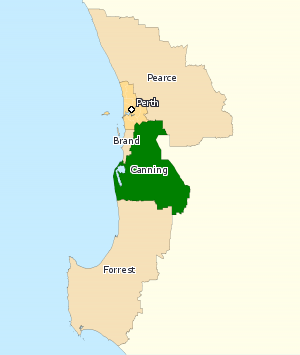
- The Division of Canning covered southeastern parts of the Perth metropolitan area and Western Australia's Peel region.
MP before election
Don Randall
Liberal
Elected MP
Andrew Hastie
Liberal

The 2015 Canning by-election was held for the Australian House of Representatives on Saturday 19 September. The by-election in the seat of Canning was triggered by the death of sitting Liberal MP Don Randall on 21 July 2015.

Speaker of the House of Representatives Tony Smith issued the writ for the by-election on 17 August 2015. Due to the requirement that the by-election must be held with at least 33 days' notice, the date set for polling day was the earliest possible day for holding it: 19 September. The electoral roll in Canning closed on 24 August and candidate nominations closed on 27 August.

Twelve candidates contested the election. Edith Cowan University political analyst Harry Phillips said despite the Liberals holding Canning since the 2001 election, it would still be a "hotly contested seat".

== Candidates ==
12 candidates in ballot paper order
Party	Candidate	Background
Palmer United	Vimal Sharma	Mining executive for Mineralogy, stood for Cowan at the 2013 federal election.
Liberal Democrats	Connor Whittle	Draughtsman from Bunbury.
Pirate	Michelle Allen	Software development manager, contested the Senate in Western Australia at the 2014 special election.
Defence Veterans	Greg Smith	Public relations agent and athlete, former journalist and Australian Army major.
Animal Justice	Katrina Love	Lead Animal Justice candidate for the WA Senate election in 2013 and the 2014 WA special election.
Liberal	Andrew Hastie	Former SAS captain, resigned to contest the election, joined the Australian military in 2001 following the September 11 attacks.
Independent	Teresa van Lieshout	Perennial candidate, most recently at the 2014 Vasse state by-election finishing last of six on 1.4 percent. A warrant has been issued for her arrest.
Labor	Matt Keogh	Commercial lawyer, President of the Western Australian Law Society until stepping down to contest the election. Member of the ALP since the age of 16. Later elected to the Division of Burt in the 2016 federal election.
Greens	Vanessa Rauland	Lecturer at Curtin University, renewable energy advocate and small business owner.
Family First	Jim McCourt	Candidate for Hasluck in 2010 and Fremantle in 2013.
Christians	Jamie van Burgel	Previously contested Canning in 2010, state Armadale in 2010 and 2013, and was lead Senate candidate for the Australian Christians in 2013.
Sustainable Population	Angela Smith	Environmental scientist. Law/Arts student at Murdoch University.

== How-to-vote cards ==
How-to-vote cards are distributed to voters at polling stations to provide information with how the candidate suggests preferences be allocated. Candidates and parties which suggested preferences are shown in each column of the table below. The Sustainable Population Party ran an open card at this by-election.

	Palmer United	Liberal Democrats	Pirate	Defence Veterans	Animal Justice	Liberal	van Lieshout	Labor	Greens	Family First	Christians	Stable Population
Palmer	1	9	8	No card	7	6	No card	6	6	6	5	
LDP	2	1	5	No card	11	5	No card	7	8	7	7	
Pirate	3	2	1	No card	3	7	No card	8	2	11	10	
ADVP	4	3	6	No card	6	4	No card	9	7	4	6	
Animal Justice	5	4	2	No card	1	9	No card	10	3	9	9	
Liberal	6	11	9	No card	12	1	No card	11	9	3	2	
van Lieshout	7	5	12	No card	10	12	No card	12	12	5	4	
Labor	8	10	7	No card	5	10	No card	1	4	8	11	
Greens	9	12	3	No card	2	11	No card	2	1	12	12	
Family First	10	6	10	No card	9	3	No card	3	10	1	3	
Christians	11	7	11	No card	8	2	No card	4	11	2	1	
SPP	12	8	4	No card	4	8	No card	5	5	10	8	1

== Polling issues ==
=== Federal ===
The Canning by-election was described by many commentators as a key test for the Abbott government and for the leadership of Prime Minister Tony Abbott. On 14 September, Malcolm Turnbull won the leadership spill against Abbott. In the lead-up to the spill, it was reported Foreign Minister Julie Bishop told Cabinet that Labor wanted the Liberals to win the seat of Canning, so Mr Abbott would not be ousted as prime minister, preferring to campaign against him at the next federal election. Earlier in the year, Western Australian backbenchers Luke Simpkins and Don Randall moved a leadership spill against Mr Abbott declaring he had disconnected from voters. The prediction of a 10-point swing against the Liberals in the Canning by-election may have sparked a realisation in the Liberal party that something had to change. Current speculation centres on what effect the leadership spill will have on the by-election. While Labor candidate Matt Keogh had begun to gain traction in the region, Turnbull's election "immediately boosted the numbers for the Liberals". However, analysis of the postal votes, which had been cast before the leadership change, show a similar swing as the polling day votes, indicating that the change in federal Liberal leadership had no effect.

Renewable energy

The solar industry letter-boxed all electors to vote against the Liberal Party and support Labor, Greens and PUP in response to the federal government's intention to scrap the small-scale renewable energy target. The Greens chose renewable energy as one of their main campaign topics, by electing Curtin University sustainability lecturer Vanessa Rauland as their candidate. An opinion poll conducted during the election campaign showed that 65% of voters would support a renewable energy target of 50% by 2030.

Same-sex marriage

Same-sex marriage legislation was identified as an issue that might be decided by a conscience vote in federal parliament. The views of all Canning candidates were surveyed by the Australian Marriage Equality group and the Mandurah Mail. Opposed to same-sex marriage were Andrew Hastie (Liberal), Jamie Van Burgel (Christians), Jim McCourt (Family First) and independent Teresa van Lieshout, while Vimal Sharma (Palmer United) did not answer the question. All other candidates supported same-sex marriage. A survey conducted by ReachTel during the campaign showed 47% of the electorate in support and 41% opposed to same-sex marriage.

=== Local ===
Crime

Police statistics in the lead-up to the by-election showed Armadale had one of the highest crime rates in the Perth metropolitan area.

Liberal candidate Andrew Hastie cited crime as a top issue, alongside jobs, and pledged one of the first things he would do if elected would be to take action on methamphetamine and ice. Hastie blamed the previous Labor federal government for leaving a "huge fiscal hole". He advocated a combined "law enforcement and a compassionate community solution". He said, "I would look at bringing a whole bunch of stakeholders together, from law enforcement through to community councillors to educators to medical people and tackling ice head on."

Labor candidate Matt Keogh also said crime and community safety were repeatedly raised by people in the electorate. He attacked the Abbott government, saying it had cut funding to crisis services and community groups dealing with ice and other drugs, domestic violence and social breakdown. Keogh said the Abbott government had stripped community organisations of certainty.

Infrastructure funding

The cities of Armadale and Cockburn joined forces to lobby the federal government to try to secure millions of dollars during the campaign to upgrade major road infrastructure. The two councils believed $300 million was needed to transform more of Armadale Road into a dual carriageway and to build a new bridge over Kwinana Freeway to link North Lake Road at Cockburn Central. The councils planned to letter drop householders voting in the Canning by-election urging them to email federal and state MPs to help secure the funding. At the Labor Party state conference on 29 August, Federal Opposition Leader Bill Shorten promised to spend $170 million on infrastructure projects in Canning.

== Voter demographics ==
The Australian Electoral Commission (AEC) announced 112,809 people were eligible to cast a vote in the by-election, after the electoral roll registration for the 19 September poll closed on 24 August. Almost half of those enrolled to vote in the by-election were aged 50 and over, reflecting the high number of retirees in the Western Australian electorate. Just 10 per cent were aged 25 or younger.

== Polling places and postal voting ==
The AEC planned 45 polling places for the by-election, with early postal voting from 25 August. The AEC planned three mobile voting teams on the day, including two teams to visit nursing homes and hospitals, and the third to visit Karnet Prison Farm in Serpentine.

== Polling ==
Canning polling
Date	Poll	Primary vote				TPP vote
		LIB	ALP	GRN	OTH	LIB	ALP
14 September 2015^{*}	ReachTEL	47.6%	32.9%	6.4%	10.4%	57%	43%
12 September 2015	Ipsos	45%	36%	9%	10%	52%	48%
12 September 2015	Galaxy	44%	36%	9%	11%	52%	48%
28 August 2015^{*}	ReachTEL	47.7%	33.8%	8%		51%	49%
26 August 2015	ReachTEL	44%	30%	9%	17%	49.9%	50.1%
15–16 August 2015	Newspoll	41%	36%	11%	12%	51%	49%
29 July 2015	ReachTEL					50.8%	49.2%
2013 election		51.1%	26.6%	7.4%	14.9%	61.8%	38.2%
^{*} The poll conducted by ReachTEL on the night of 14 September (following Turnbull's election) had an "undecided" option. 2.6% chose this option.
^{*} The poll conducted by ReachTel on 28 August had an "undecided" option. 6.5% voted undecided and there were no options for other candidates.

On 14 September, four days before the election and amid the rolling of Tony Abbott as Prime Minister of Australia, the ReachTel poll showed Liberal at a by-election campaign high of 57% compared to Labor at 43% on two party preferred vote.

Previously, the ReachTEL poll published in The West Australian on 28 August, showed Liberal ahead 51% to 49%. The poll of 782 voters was commissioned by Australian Marriage Equality and WA director Brian Greig said the 62% support for gay marriage among undecided voters could decide the by-election.

Days earlier, the ReachTEL poll published in The West Australian on 26 August, Labor was slightly ahead 50.1% to Liberal on 49.9%. The poll of 768 voters was commissioned by the union United Voice.

On 15–16 August 2015, 508 Canning voters (MoE of 4.3^) were polled by Newspoll via landline phone. Primary votes were Liberal 41% (−10.1), Labor 36% (+9.4), Greens 11% (+3.6), Palmer 2% (−4.9) and Others 10% (+2.0). Based on preference flows at the previous election (which have recently significantly favoured Liberal in national polling compared to respondent-allocated preferences), the two-party vote equated to Liberal 51% (−10.8) and Labor 49% (+10.8).

== Two-party-preferred history since 2001 ==
Election:	2001	2004	2007	2010	2013
Liberal:	50.4%	59.5%	55.6%	52.2%	61.8%
Labor:	49.6%	40.5%	44.4%	47.8%	38.2%

== Results ==
2015 Canning by-election
Party	Candidate	Votes	%	±%
Liberal	Andrew Hastie	39,712	46.92	−4.15
Labor	Matt Keogh	30,096	35.56	+8.92
Greens	Vanessa Rauland	4,967	5.87	−1.53
Palmer United	Vimal Sharma	2,600	3.07	−3.81
Christians	Jamie van Burgel	2,433	2.87	−0.23
Animal Justice	Katrina Love	1,195	1.41	+1.41
Pirate	Michelle Allen	775	0.92	+0.92
Defence Veterans	Greg Smith	690	0.82	+0.82
Family First	Jim McCourt	623	0.74	−0.61
Independent	Teresa van Lieshout	539	0.64	+0.64
Sustainable Population	Angela Smith	513	0.61	+0.61
Liberal Democrats	Connor Whittle	492	0.58	+0.58
Total formal votes		84,635	94.34	−0.14
Informal votes		5,082	5.66	+0.14
Turnout		89,717	79.53	−12.48
Two-party-preferred result
Liberal	Andrew Hastie	46,772	55.26	−6.55
Labor	Matt Keogh	37,863	44.74	+6.55
Liberal hold		Swing	−6.55	

Though the Turnbull government was just four days old, their candidate Andrew Hastie retained the seat for the Liberals, declared 24 September, despite having to rely on preferences after a substantial, though dampened, primary (−4.15) and two-party (−6.55) swing away from the Liberals − solidly less than the double-digit swings polls had predicted under an Abbott government − however, some double-digit swings did eventuate among the suburban booths in the north of the seat. The Canning Liberal margin was reduced from safe to marginal status. Political analysts agreed the by-election was a "good outcome for both major parties".

== See also ==
- List of Australian federal by-elections
