= Australian Equality Party (Marriage) =

- Leader: Jason Tuazon-McCheyne
- Founded: 9 October 2014
- Dissolved: 26 March 2018
- Headquarters: Melbourne, Victoria
- Ideology: LGBT rights

Website
- www.equality.org.au

The Australian Equality Party (Marriage) (also AEP; formerly Australian Equality Party until January 2016) was an Australian political party founded by Jason Tuazon-McCheyne. The AEP had a platform that promoted equality and human rights, particularly in relation to the LGBTQ community. The party's goal was to get AEP Leader, Jason Tuazon-McCheyne, elected to the Senate at the 2016 Australian federal election.

== History ==
The Australian Equality Party was launched on 2 February 2014 by Jason Tuazon-McCheyne and his team at Melbourne's LGBTIQ Pride March in St Kilda. At that time the AEP released its first suite of policies relating to LGBTIQ people at the parade, including marriage equality, health and wellbeing issues for LGBTIQ people and reform for laws regarding LGBTIQ people's rights to adoption.

The AEP was registered with the Australian Electoral Commission (AEC) on 9 October 2014. The Convenor of the AEP was Jason Tuazon-McCheyne. On 27 January 2016, the AEC approved a name change to append the word "Marriage" to the party's official name.

In 2014 the AEP was only active in Victoria, focusing on gathering support for its campaign to elect its leader Jason Tuazon-McCheyne as a Senator for the state of Victoria at the 2016 federal election.

In the 2016 federal election AEP fielded two senate candidates in each of Queensland, South Australia and Victoria, and three candidates in Victoria for the House of Representatives. None of these candidates were elected. The party received 0.87%, 0.38% and 0.49% of first preference votes in the three states it contested for Senate seats and 1.59% of first preference votes in its highest-polling House seat, Melbourne Ports.

The party was deregistered voluntarily on 26 March 2018.

== Leadership ==
The leader of the AEP was Jason Tuazon-McCheyne, a civil celebrant in Victoria. Tuazon-McCheyne is married to his husband Adrian, they have a son and live in Melbourne's north west.

Deputy Leader Jacqueline Tomlins is a writer, campaigner and activist and has been involved in a variety of LGBTIQ related campaigns, particularly around marriage equality and a legal challenge in the High Court of Australia to a ban on recognition of overseas same-sex marriages in Australia.

== See also ==
- Dignity Party (South Australia)
- LGBT rights in Australia
- Same-sex marriage in Australia
