= Australian Cyclists Party =

- Leader: Omar Khalifa
- Founded: 2013; 13 years ago
- Dissolved: 4 September 2017; 9 years ago
- Merged into: Reason Australia
- Headquarters: PO Box 460, Berry NSW 2535
- Ideology: Cycling issues
- Slogan: I Cycle, I Vote

The Australian Cyclists Party was a minor political party in Australia. It was registered with the New South Wales Electoral Commission in 2014, and unsuccessfully contested the 2015 New South Wales state election. It was also registered later with the Victorian Electoral Commission, and unsuccessfully contested the 2014 Victorian state election. It registered with the Australian Electoral Commission for federal elections on 20 August 2014 and voluntarily deregistered on 5 September 2017.

The party used the slogan I Cycle, I Vote, and aimed to raise awareness of cycling-related issues.

The party's founder was Omar Khalifa, a former CEO of Bicycle New South Wales. Khalifa was the lead candidate in the group of 15 candidates (this many are required to get a box "above the line") at the 2015 New South Wales state election in the New South Wales Legislative Council, coming third-last of all parties with just 0.43 percent of the vote. The party also fielded candidates in six lower house electorates.

The Australian Cyclists Party fielded nine senate candidates and two candidates for seats in the House of Representatives in the 2016 federal election. The one Cyclists Party candidate in Victoria was second in Group E on the Senate ballot paper, sharing the group with the candidate for the Science Party. In 2017, the party deregistered and merged with the Australian Sex Party to form Reason Australia.

== See also ==
- Bicycle safety
- Cyclability
- Cycling advocacy
- Cycling in Australia
- Cycling infrastructure
- Safety of cycling infrastructure
