= Australian Antipaedophile Party =

- Convenor: William Russell Massingham Pridgeon
- Founded: 2015
- Dissolved: 25 November 2016
- Ideology: Family Court reform

Website
- www.antipaedophileparty.com

The Australian Antipaedophile Party was an Australian political party registered with the Australian Electoral Commission during 2016. It was known as the Australians Against Paedophiles Party until 3 March 2016. It was voluntarily deregistered on 25 November 2016.

The party intended to focus on a single issue of child sexual abuse by advocating in the Australian Senate for the creation of a Royal Commission to investigate perceived failings in the Family Court of Australia.

William Russell Massingham Pridgeon, a Grafton general practitioner, established the party in 2015. He said on its website that he had turned to politics after trying to protect his wife's son from the son's biological father's paedophilia. The biological father launched defamation proceedings against Pridgeon in the Supreme Court of New South Wales in the leadup to the 2016 federal election.

== 2016 federal election ==
The Australian Antipaedophile Party nominated a total of four senate candidates (one each in New South Wales, Northern Territory, South Australia and Tasmania), and one House of Representatives candidate (for the Division of Robertson) in the 2016 federal election.

The South Australian Senate candidate, Ronald Waters, had a past conviction for being an accessory after the fact to two murders at a massage parlour in New South Wales in 1994 by Lindsay Robert Rose. The spent conviction would not disqualify him from sitting in parliament.

The party was voluntarily deregistered on 25 November 2016.
