= Mature Australia Party =

- Leader: Jim Savage
- President: Jim Savage
- Founded: October 2014
- Dissolved: 4 July 2017
- Headquarters: Palm Cove, Queensland

Website
- http://themap.org.au/

The Mature Australia Party was a minor political party registered for federal elections in Australia between 2014 and 2017.

The Mature Australia Party (at that stage known as the Mature Age Party) had intended to contest the 2015 Queensland election, but was not organised in time when the election was called early.

In the 2016 federal election Mature Australia fielded two senate candidates in each mainland state, plus one in each of Tasmania and the Australian Capital Territory. It also endorsed two House of Representatives candidates in Western Australia and one each in New South Wales and Queensland.

The Australian Electoral Commission gave notice on 29 May 2017 that it was considering deregistering the party under subsection 137(1)(cb) of the Commonwealth Electoral Act 1918 which relates to complying with notices from the Commission. When the party did not respond to the notice, it was deregistered by the AEC on 4 July 2017.

== See also ==
- Seniors United Party
