= Australian Recreational Fishers Party =

- President: Todd Lambert
- Secretary: Kevin Harkins
- Headquarters: Tasmania
- Ideology: Recreational fishers' rights

Website
- www.arfparty.org

The Australian Recreational Fishers Party was a political party in the Australian state of Tasmania. It was created to defend recreational fishing against perceived intrusion from the commercial fishing industry, in particular to oppose the use of super trawlers such as Geelong Star in Australian waters.

The party was announced in April 2015, and was registered by the Australian Electoral Commission (AEC) in May 2016. Its first and only election was the 2016 federal election, where it fielded candidates in three of the five House of Representatives seats in Tasmania, as well as two Senate candidates. The party polled 3.35 percent of the state-wide House of Representatives vote, the fourth-best of any party. Its best result was 6.31 percent in the Division of Lyons. However, the Senate ticket only received 0.70 percent of the state-wide vote.

On 4 July 2017, the AEC gave notice of its consideration to deregister the party under subsection 137(1)(cb) of the Commonwealth Electoral Act 1918. The party's founder, ex-Labor candidate Kevin Harkins, said the process was voluntary and that the party's members felt the interests of recreational fishers would be better served by a lobby group. The deregistration occurred on 10 August 2017.
