= Australian Defence Veterans Party =

- President: Ron Evans
- Founded: 26 January 2014
- Legalised: 15 June 2015
- Dissolved: 8 February 2017
- Ideology: Veterans interests
- Colours: Scarlet

Website
- http://www.advp.org.au/

The Australian Defence Veterans Party (often shortened to Veterans Party) was a minor political party which formed in Australia in 2015 to advocate for military veterans.

In November 2014, Senator Jacqui Lambie—then a member of the Palmer United Party, and an advocate for defence veterans and personnel, liked the proposed party's Facebook page, triggering an increase in membership enquiries and speculation that Lambie could join the ADVP, however she instead registered a separate party called the Jacqui Lambie Network on 14 May 2015.

The party was registered with the Australian Electoral Commission on 15 June 2015. In August 2015, the ADVP announced that former Army officer Dr Greg Smith would be the party's first candidate for the Canning by-election. The ADVP and Smith finished eighth out of twelve candidates with a 0.8% vote.

The Veterans Party fielded two senate candidates in each of Queensland and New South Wales, and four candidates for seats in the House of Representatives (three in Queensland and one in New South Wales) in the 2016 federal election. On 26 January 2017, Veterans Party ceased operating as a registered political party, and it was de-registered by the Australian Electoral Commission on 8 February.
