= Arts Party =

The Arts Party
- Leader: Barry Keldoulis
- Party Secretary: PJ Collins
- Party Agent: Larry Dixon
- Founded: August 2014
- Headquarters: Kingsford, New South Wales
- Ideology: Progressivism; Humanism; Environmentalism; Increased funding for public broadcasting and the arts
- Colours: Purple

Website
- http://www.artsparty.org/

The Arts Party is an Australian political party inspired by the importance of the arts and creative action. The party was voluntarily deregistered with the Australian Electoral Commission on 25 June 2019, but remains registered for local elections with the New South Wales Electoral Commission.

== History ==
The Australian party was founded in October 2013 by two Sydney-based artists, PJ Collins and Nicholas Gledhill, and registered by the Australian Electoral Commission (AEC) in August 2014. Money was raised for the party's registration through a crowd-funding campaign.

Two Arts Party members stood as independent candidates at the 2015 Queensland state election, as the party had not been registered in time to contest the election. Later in the year, the party's leader, PJ Collins, stood as an ungrouped Legislative Council candidate at the 2015 New South Wales state election.

The first official Arts Party candidate was Lou Pollard in the 2015 North Sydney by-election, who came eighth in a field of 13 candidates.

The Arts Party fielded seven candidates for the House of Representatives and thirteen senate candidates across all states in the 2016 federal election. Once again, the entire campaign was financed through a crowd-funding campaign.

The House of Representatives candidates were Anthony Ackroyd in the electorate of Wentworth (NSW), Shea Caplice in the electorate of Warringah (NSW), Tim Sanderson in the electorate of Franklin (Tasmania), Christopher Gordon in the electorate of Bennelong (NSW), Sally Baillieu in the electorate of Dunkley (Victoria), Stephen Beck in the electorate of Longman (Queensland) and Andrew Charles Tyrrell in the electorate of Petrie (Queensland).

In voting for the Senate, the party ranked nationally 28th out of 55 parties, based on first preference votes by group, polling 0.27% of first preferences nationwide.

At the 2021 New South Wales local elections, the party received 536 votes.

== See also ==
- Fusion Party
