= 2016 Australian House of Representatives election =

2016 Australian federal election (House of Representatives)
- 2 July 2016
- All 150 seats in the Australian House of Representatives; 76 seats needed for a majority
- Turnout: 91.0%
Party	Leader	Vote %	Seats	+/–
Labor	Bill Shorten	34.7%	69	+14
Liberal	Malcolm Turnbull	28.7%	45	−13
Liberal National	Tim Nicholls	8.5%	21	−1
National	Barnaby Joyce	4.6%	10	+1
Greens	Richard Di Natale	10.2%	1	0
Xenophon Team	Nick Xenophon	1.9%	1	New
Katter's Australian	Bob Katter	0.5%	1	0
Country Liberal	Adam Giles	0.2%	0	−1
Palmer United	Clive Palmer	0.0%	0	−1
Independents	—	3.0%	2	0
This lists parties that won seats. See the complete results below.
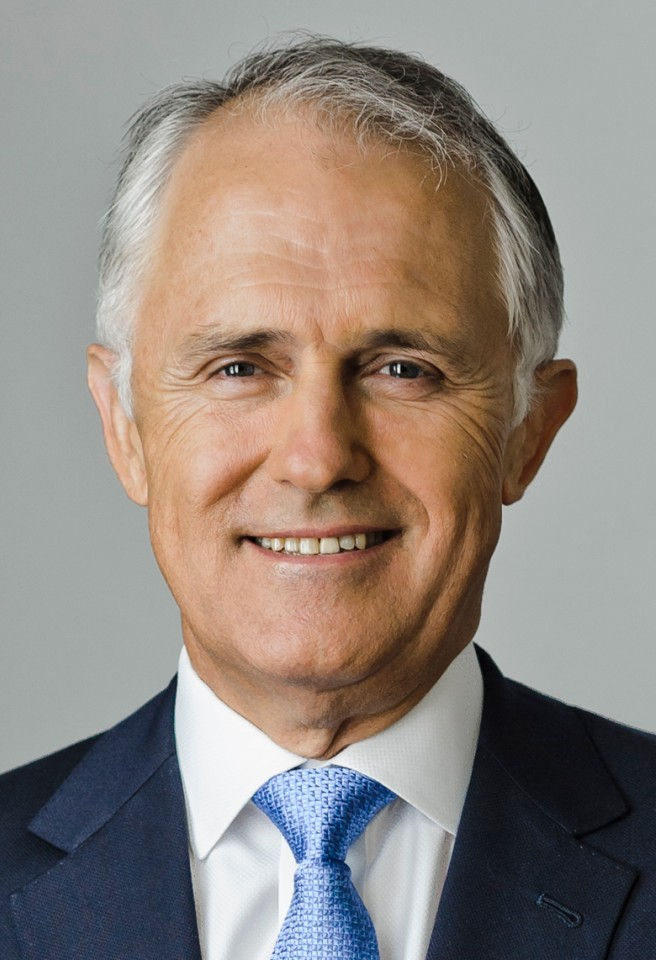

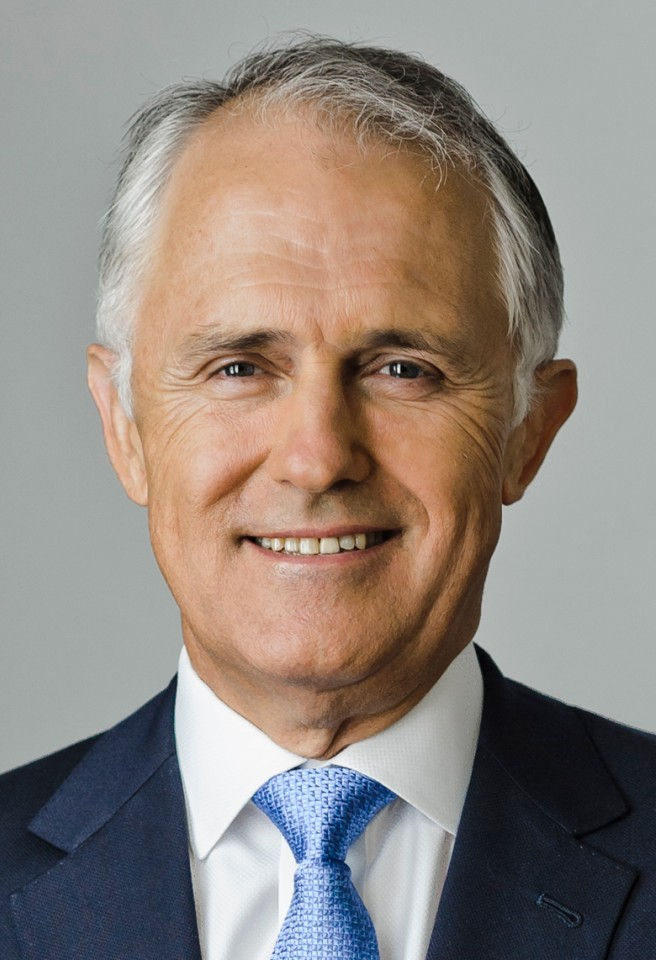
Prime Minister before	Prime Minister after
Malcolm Turnbull; Coalition	Malcolm Turnbull; Coalition

The following tables show state-by-state results in the Australian House of Representatives at the 2016 federal election, Coalition 76, Labor 69, Australian Greens 1, Nick Xenophon Team 1, Katter's Australian Party 1, with 2 independents.

A number of initially elected senators were declared ineligible a result of the 2017–18 Australian parliamentary eligibility crisis, and replaced after recounts.

== Australia ==
First preference vote results. Different shading indicated party strength in the division.

Two-party preferred results. Different shading indicated party strength in the division.

Government (76) Coalition Liberal (45) LNP (21) (Note: 15 LNP MPs sit in the Liberal party room and 6 in the National party room) National (10) Opposition (69) Labor (69) Crossbench (5) Greens (1) Xenophon (1) Katter (1) Independent (2) (Note: independent MPs: Andrew Wilkie (Denison) and Cathy McGowan (Indi).)

House of Representatives (IRV) — Turnout 91.01% (CV) — Informal 5.05%
Party	Votes	%	Swing	Seats	Change
Australian Labor Party	4,702,296	34.73	+1.35	69	▲14
Coalition	5,693,605	42.04	−3.51	76	▼14
Liberal Party of Australia	3,882,905	28.67	−3.35	45	▼13
Liberal National Party (QLD)	1,153,736	8.52	−0.40	21	▼1
National Party of Australia	624,555	4.61	+0.32	10	▲1
Country Liberal Party (NT)	32,409	0.24	−0.08	0	▼1
Australian Greens	1,385,650	10.23	+1.58	1	Steady
Nick Xenophon Team	250,333	1.85	+1.85	1	▲1
Family First Party	201,222	1.49	+0.08		
Christian Democratic Party	178,026	1.31	+0.62		
Pauline Hanson's One Nation	175,020	1.29	+1.12		
Animal Justice Party	94,516	0.70	+0.69		
Katter's Australian Party	72,879	0.54	−0.50	1	Steady
Rise Up Australia Party	68,418	0.51	+0.13		
Liberal Democratic Party	66,261	0.49	+0.45		
Australian Christians	43,150	0.32	−0.01		
Australian Liberty Alliance	25,337	0.19	+0.19		
Drug Law Reform Australia	20,350	0.15	+0.15		
Derryn Hinch's Justice Party	16,885	0.12	+0.12		
Shooters, Fishers and Farmers Party	15,477	0.11	+0.11		
Science Party	14,988	0.11	+0.10		
Bullet Train for Australia	14,078	0.10	−0.05		
Australian Sex Party	12,683	0.09	−0.52		
Australian Recreational Fishers Party	11,254	0.08	+0.08		
Glenn Lazarus Team	10,094	0.07	+0.07		
Renewable Energy Party	8,642	0.06	+0.06		
Online Direct Democracy	8,511	0.06	+0.06		
Australian Country Party	7,033	0.05	+0.01		
Australia First Party	6,895	0.05	−0.01		
Arts Party	6,821	0.05	+0.05		
Mature Australia Party	5,888	0.04	+0.04		
Citizens Electoral Council	5,175	0.04	−0.04		
Australian Defence Veterans Party	4,360	0.03	+0.03		
Non-Custodial Parents Party	3,663	0.03	+0.02		
Socialist Alliance	3,653	0.03	−0.01		
CountryMinded	3,478	0.03	+0.03		
Australian Equality Party (Marriage)	3,296	0.02	+0.02		
Democratic Labour Party	3,166	0.02	−0.26		
Outdoor Recreation Party (Stop The Greens)	2,375	0.02	+0.02		
Consumer Rights & No-Tolls	2,050	0.02	+0.02		
Socialist Equality Party	1,608	0.01	+0.01		
Australian Antipaedophile Party	1,527	0.01	+0.01		
Smokers' Rights Party	1,343	0.01	+0.01		
Pirate Party Australia	1,260	0.01	+0.01		
HEMP Party	1,143	0.01	+0.01		
Voluntary Euthanasia Party	973	0.01	+0.01		
Australian Cyclists Party	846	0.01	+0.01		
Sustainable Australia	606	0.00	−0.03		
Palmer United Party	315	0.00	−5.49	0	▼1
Australian Progressives	282	0.00	+0.00		
Independents	380,712	2.81	+1.44	2	Steady
Non Affiliated	2,958	0.02	−0.02		
Total	13,541,101			150	
Two-party-preferred vote
Liberal/National Coalition	6,818,824	50.36	−3.13	76	▼14
Australian Labor Party	6,722,277	49.64	+3.13	69	▲14
Invalid/blank votes	131,722	4.70	−0.86		
Total votes	14,262,016				
Registered voters/turnout	15,671,551	91.01	–2.22		
Source: Federal Election 2016

== New South Wales ==
2016 Australian federal election (New South Wales)
- 2 July 2016

All 47 New South Wales seats in the Australian House of Representatives and all 12 seats in the Australian Senate
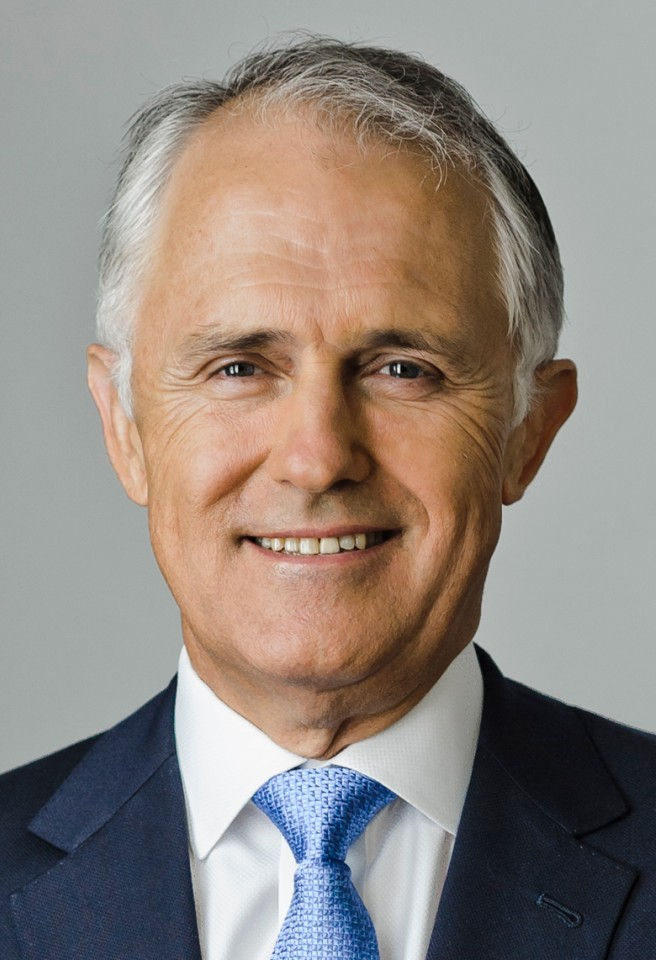

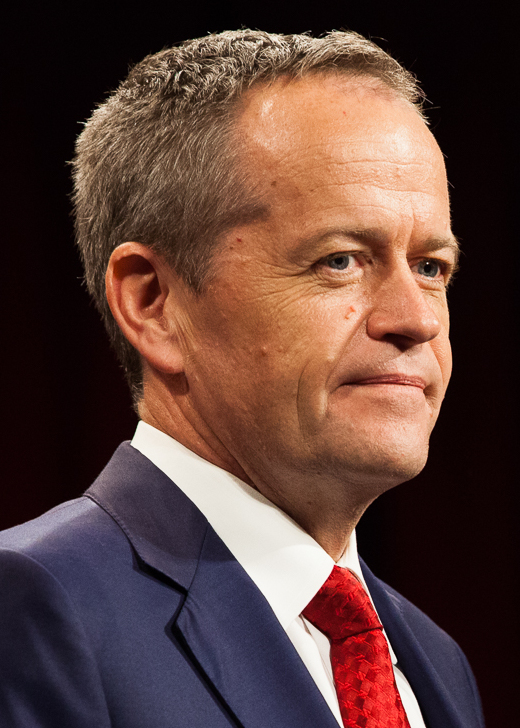
	First party	Second party
Leader	Malcolm Turnbull	Bill Shorten
Party	Liberal/National coalition	Labor
Last election	30 seats	18 seats
Seats won	23 seats	24 seats
Seat change	▼7	▲6
Percentage	42.32%	36.93%
Swing	▼5.02	▲2.41
TPP	50.53%	49.47%
TPP swing	▼3.82	▲3.82
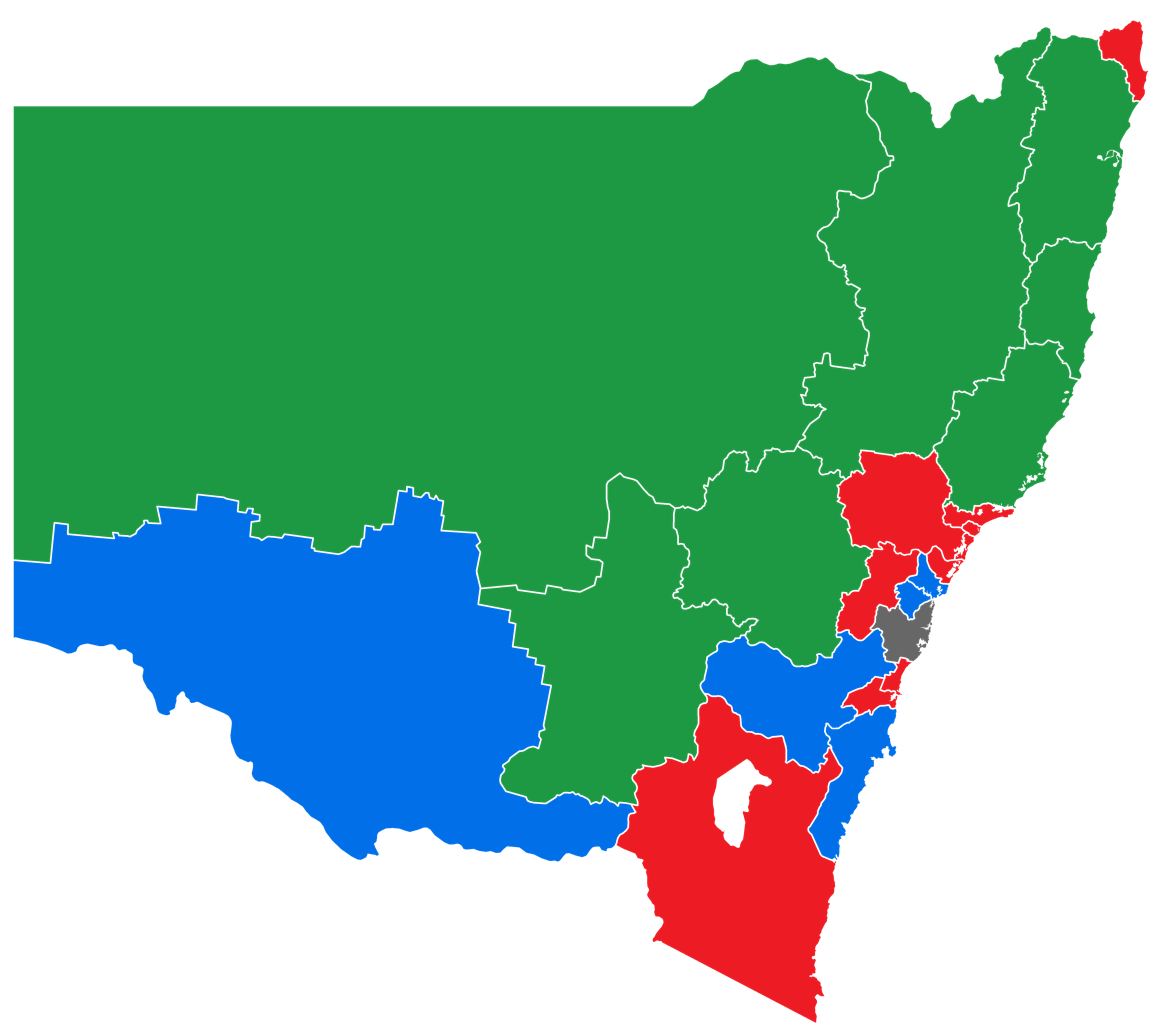
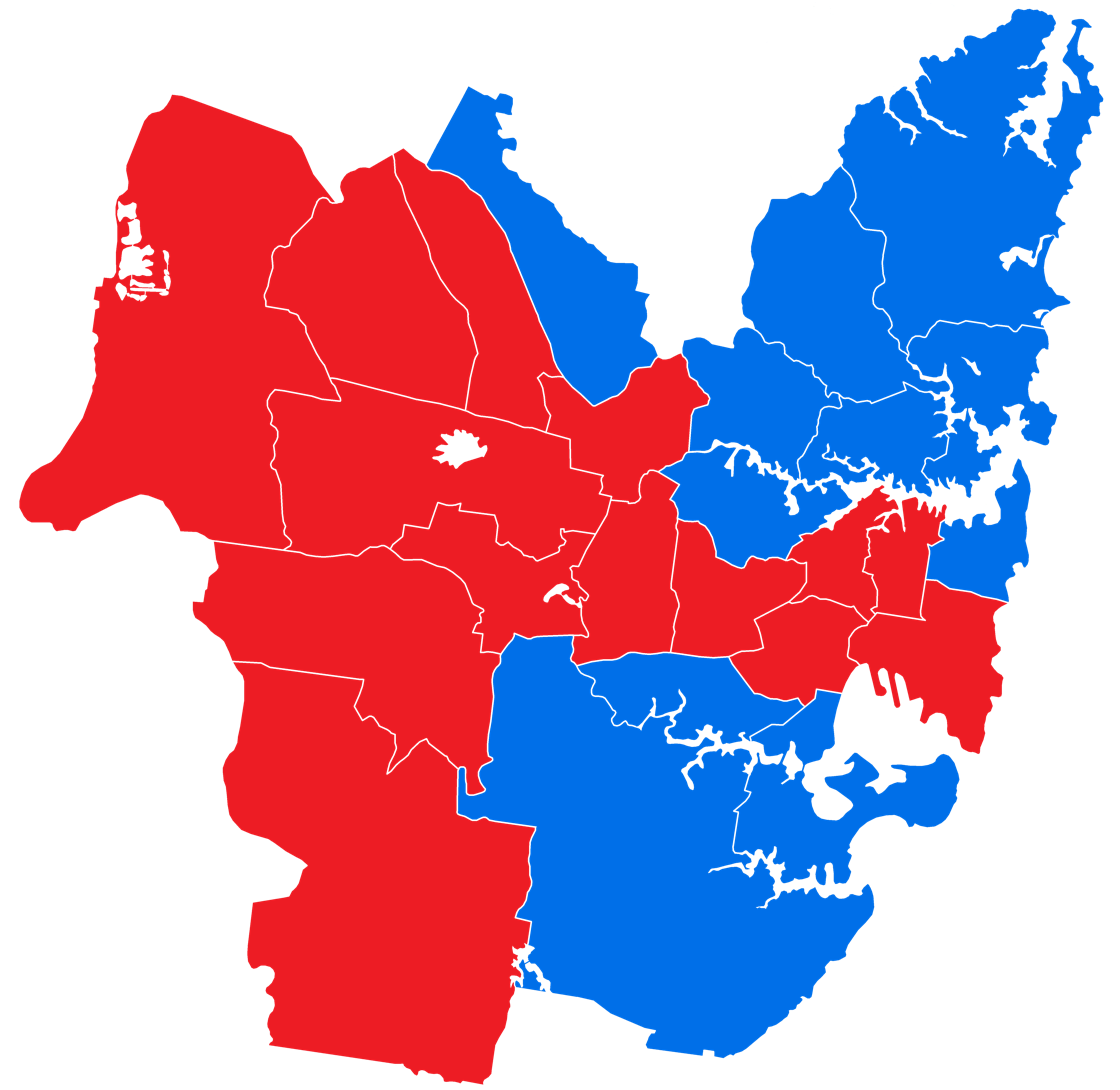

Party	Votes	%	Swing	Seats	Change
Coalition	1,847,305	42.32	–5.02	23	▼7
Liberal Party of Australia	1,426,424	32.68	–4.67	16	▼7
National Party of Australia	420,881	9.64	−0.35	7	Steady
Australian Labor Party	1,611,549	36.93	+2.41	24	▲6
Australian Greens	390,737	8.95	+1.00		
Christian Democratic Party	169,966	3.89	+1.76		
Pauline Hanson's One Nation	27,542	0.63	+0.16		
Animal Justice Party	20,695	0.47	+0.47		
Liberal Democratic Party	20,231	0.46	+0.46		
Nick Xenophon Team	16,084	0.37	+0.37		
Science Party	14,988	0.34	+0.32		
Family First Party	11,725	0.27	+0.27		
Australian Liberty Alliance	11,473	0.26	+0.26		
Online Direct Democracy	5,780	0.13	+0.13		
Drug Law Reform Australia	4,420	0.10	+0.10		
Non-Custodial Parents Party	3,663	0.08	+0.05		
Shooters, Fishers and Farmers Party	3,550	0.08	+0.08		
Derryn Hinch's Justice Party	3,150	0.07	+0.07		
The Arts Party	3,139	0.07	+0.07		
Australia First Party	2,865	0.07	−0.08		
Citizens Electoral Council	2,789	0.06	−0.04		
Australian Sex Party	2,390	0.05	−0.03		
Bullet Train for Australia	2,267	0.05	−0.15		
Mature Australia Party	1,783	0.04	+0.04		
Australian Antipaedophile Party	1,527	0.03	+0.03		
Australian Defence Veterans Party	1,448	0.03	+0.03		
Smokers' Rights Party	1,343	0.03	+0.03		
CountryMinded	1,337	0.03	+0.03		
Socialist Equality Party	1,313	0.03	+0.03		
Pirate Party	1,260	0.03	+0.03		
Rise Up Australia Party	1,007	0.02	−0.11		
Democratic Labour Party	968	0.02	−0.11		
Sustainable Australia	606	0.01	−0.04		
Renewable Energy Party	537	0.01	+0.01		
Socialist Alliance	500	0.01	–0.02		
Australian Cyclists Party	460	0.01	–0.02		
Independent	171,795	3.94	+2.21		
Non Affiliated	2,128	0.05	+0.05		
Total	4,364,320			47	▼1
Two-party-preferred vote
Liberal/National Coalition	2,205,107	50.53	−3.82	23	▼7
Australian Labor Party	2,159,213	49.47	+3.82	24	▲6

Liberal to Labor: Barton, Dobell, Eden-Monaro, Lindsay, Macarthur, Macquarie, Paterson

== Victoria ==
2016 Australian federal election (Victoria)
- 2 July 2016

All 37 Victorian seats in the Australian House of Representatives and all 12 seats in the Australian Senate
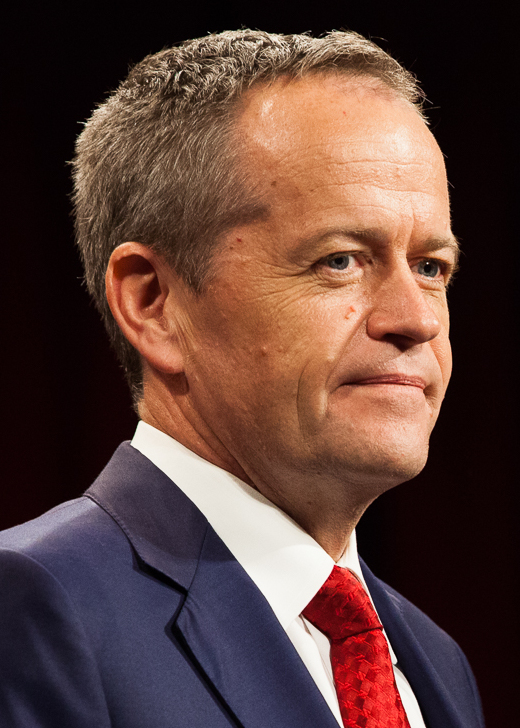

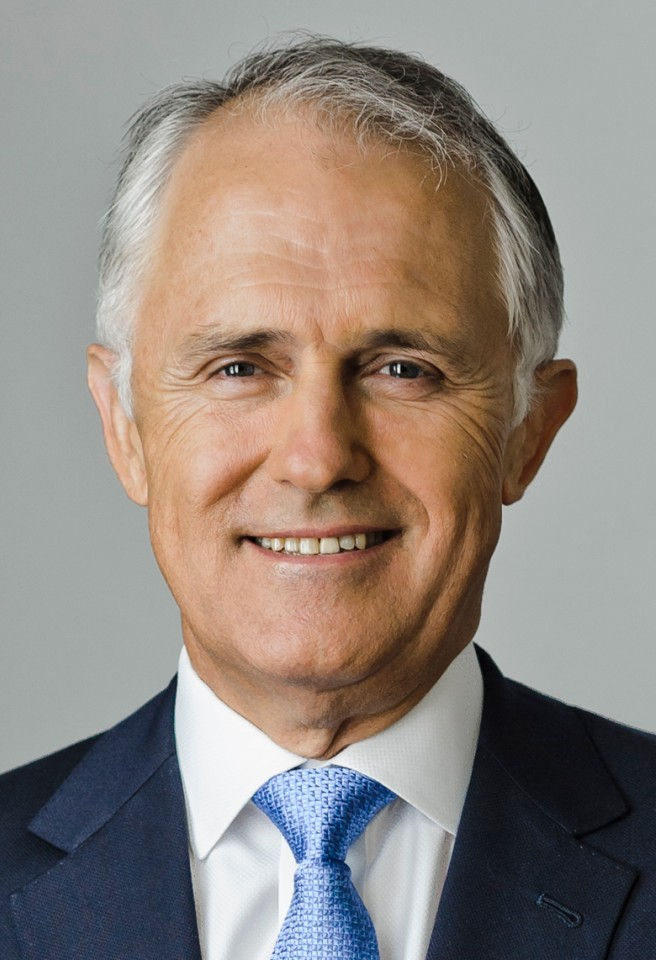

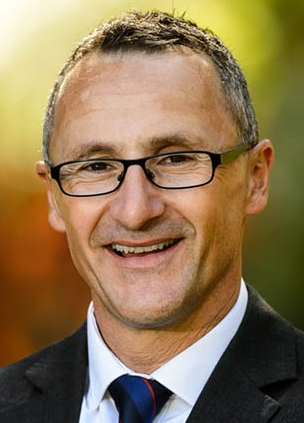
	First party	Second party	Third party
Leader	Bill Shorten	Malcolm Turnbull	Richard Di Natale
Party	Labor	Liberal/National coalition	Greens
Last election	19 seats	16 seats	1 seat
Seats won	18 seats	17 seats	1 seat
Seat change	▼1	▲1
Percentage	35.58%	41.76%	13.13%
Swing	▲0.77	▼0.93	▲2.33
TPP	51.83%	48.17%
TPP swing	▲1.63	▼1.63
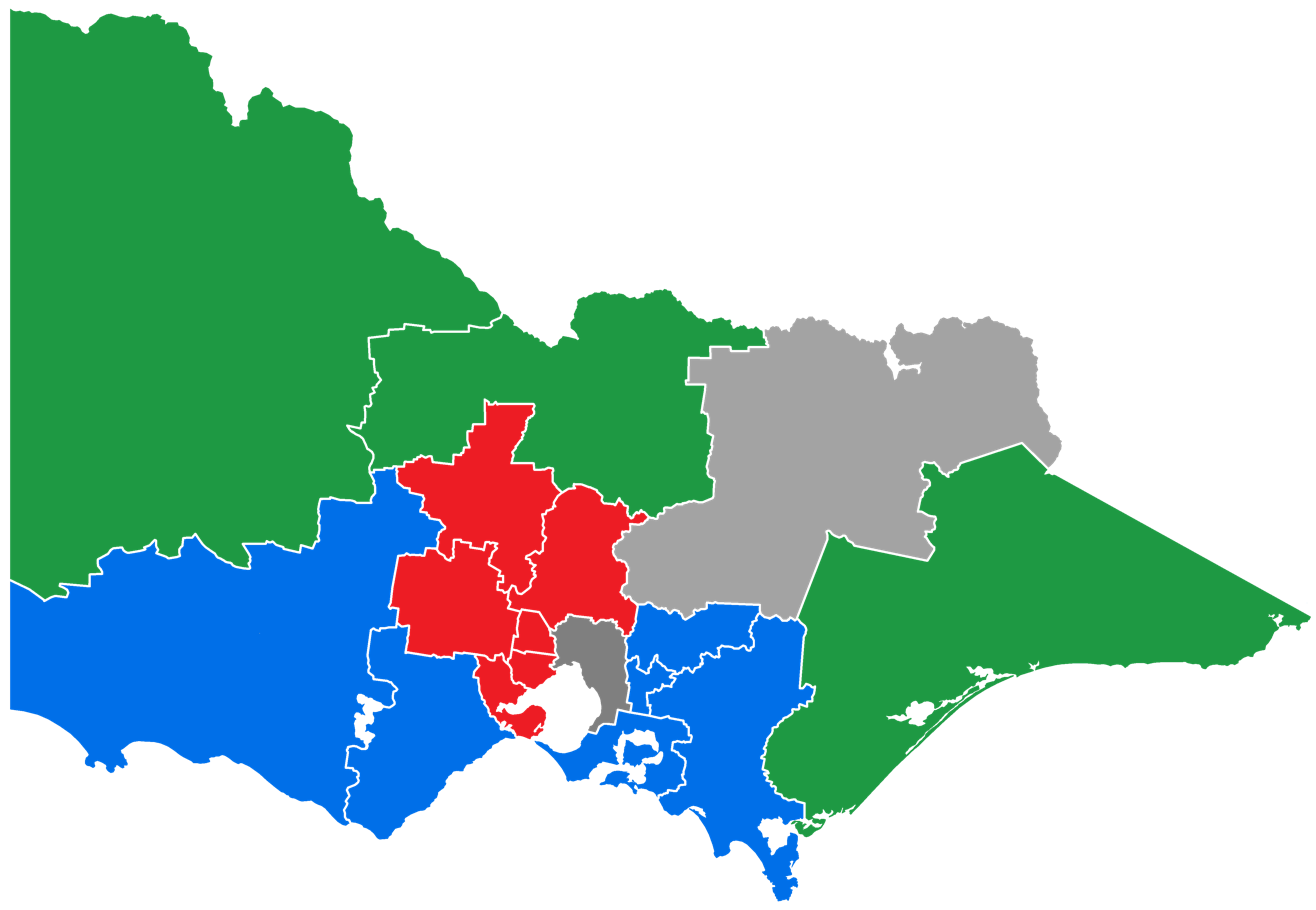
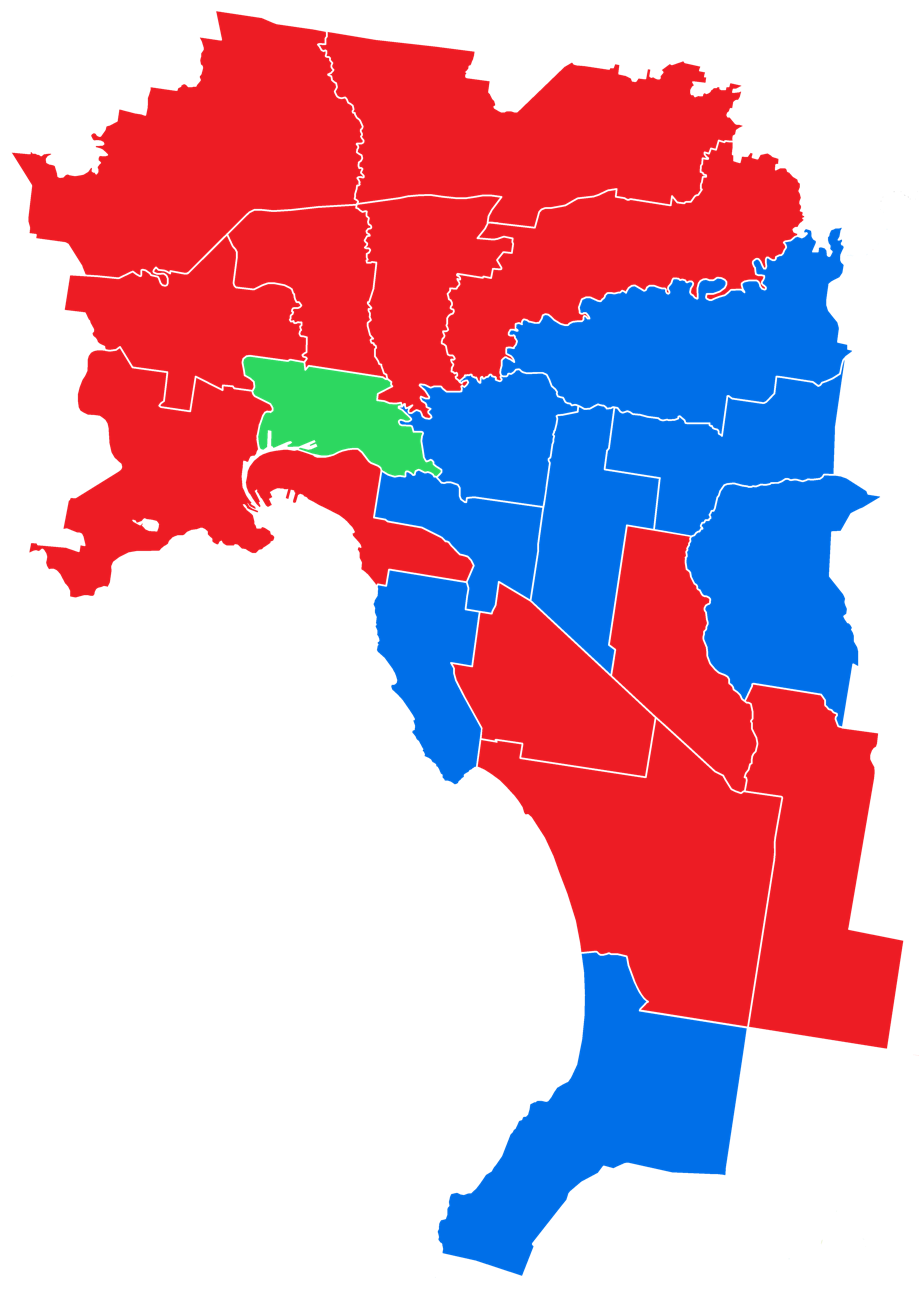

Party	Votes	%	Swing	Seats	Change
Liberal/National Coalition
Liberal Party of Australia	1,273,419	37.01	–3.07	14	Steady
National Party of Australia	163,514	4.75	+2.14	3	▲1
Coalition total	1,436,933	41.76	–0.93	17	▲1
Australian Labor Party	1,224,051	35.58	+0.77	18	▼1
Australian Greens	451,700	13.13	+2.33	1	Steady
Animal Justice Party	64,940	1.89	+1.83		
Family First Party	44,623	1.31	–0.50		
Rise Up Australia Party	39,579	1.15	+0.60		
Derryn Hinch's Justice Party	13,735	0.40	+0.40		
Liberal Democratic Party	13,006	0.38	+0.24		
Drug Law Reform Australia	11,464	0.33	+0.33		
Australian Sex Party	10,293	0.30	−1.75		
Australian Christians	8,953	0.26	−0.22		
Australian Country Party	7,033	0.20	+0.06		
Renewable Energy Party	3,571	0.10	+0.10		
Australian Equality Party (Marriage)	3,296	0.10	+0.10		
Australia First Party	3,232	0.09	−0.06		
Nick Xenophon Team	2,007	0.06	+0.06		
Citizens Electoral Council	1,942	0.06	+0.04		
Socialist Alliance	1,749	0.05	+0.00		
Shooters, Fishers and Farmers Party	1,321	0.04	+0.04		
Bullet Train for Australia	1,138	0.03	−0.02		
Voluntary Euthanasia Party	973	0.03	+0.03		
The Arts Party	542	0.02	+0.02		
Australian Cyclists Party	386	0.01	+0.01		
Socialist Equality Party	295	0.01	+0.01		
Australian Progressives	282	0.01	+0.01		
Independent	93,610	2.72	+1.08	1	Steady
Total	3,440,654			37	
Two-party-preferred vote
Australian Labor Party	1,783,375	51.83	+1.63	18	▼1
Liberal/National Coalition	1,657,279	48.17	−1.63	17	▲1

Labor to Liberal: Chisholm

Liberal to National: Murray

== Queensland ==
2016 Australian federal election (Queensland)
- 2 July 2016

All 30 Queensland seats in the Australian House of Representatives and all 12 seats in the Australian Senate
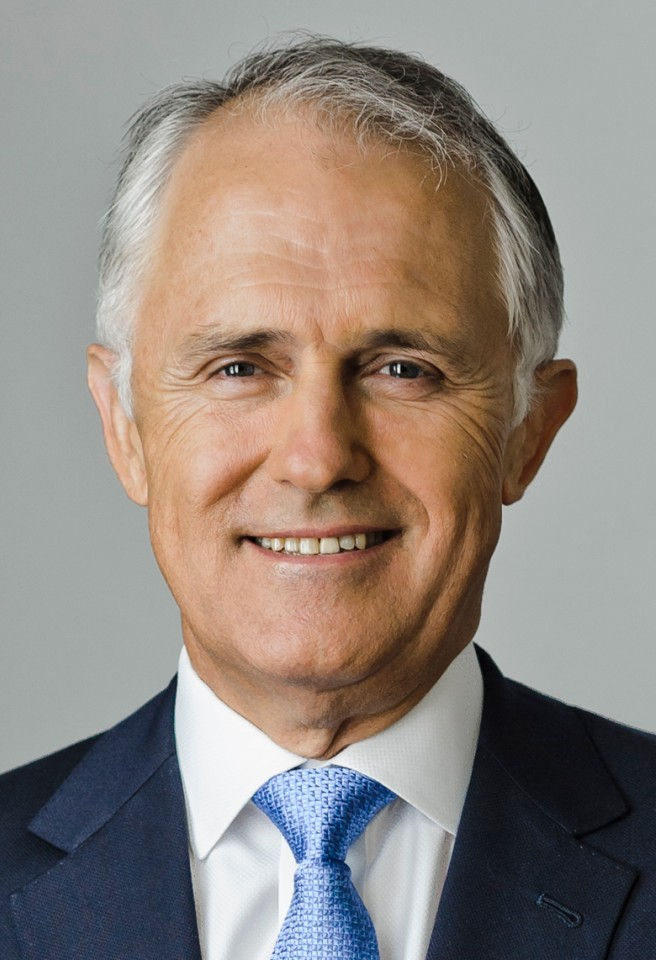

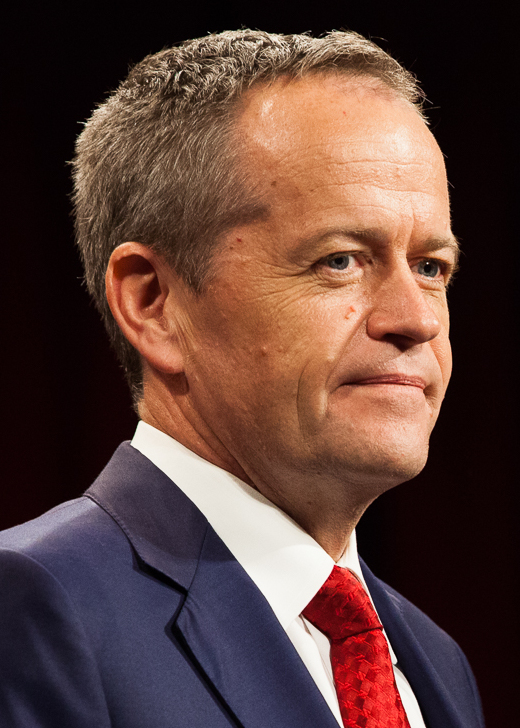

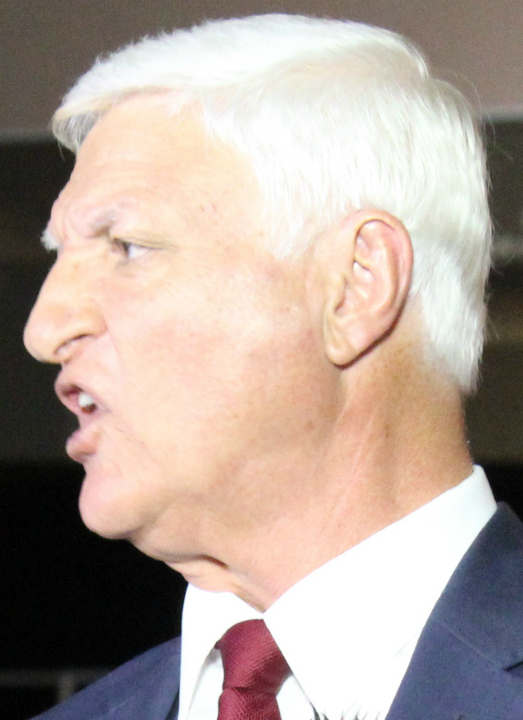
	First party	Second party	Third party
Leader	Malcolm Turnbull	Bill Shorten	Bob Katter
Party	Liberal National	Labor	Katter's Australian
Leader since			3 June 2011
Leader's seat			Kennedy (Qld.)
Last election	22 seats	6 seats	1 seat
Seats won	21 seats	8 seats	1 seat
Seat change	▼1	▲2	Steady
Percentage	43.19%	30.91%	2.73%
Swing	▼2.47	▲1.14	▼1.02
TPP	54.10%	45.90%
TPP swing	▼2.88	▲2.88
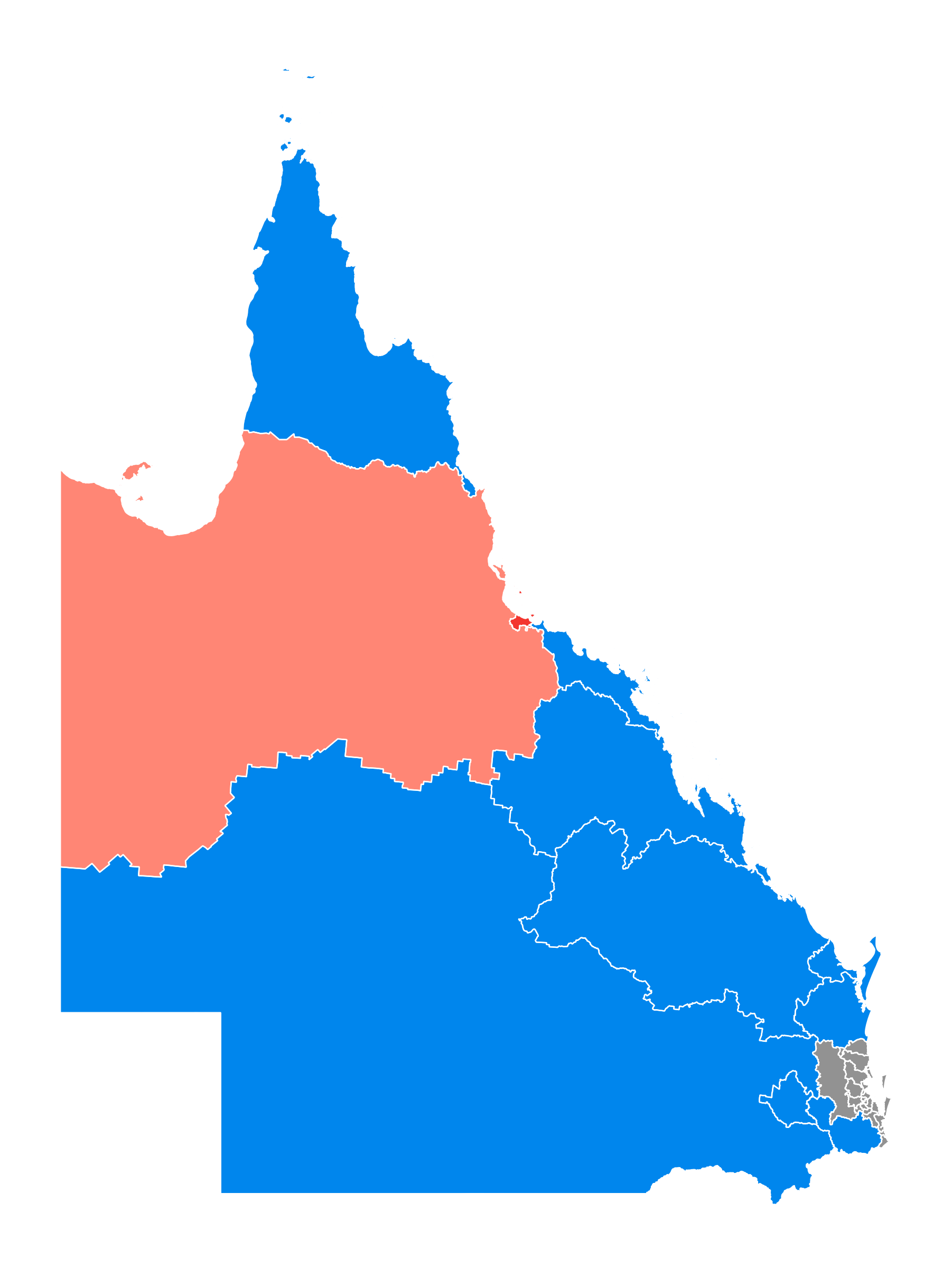
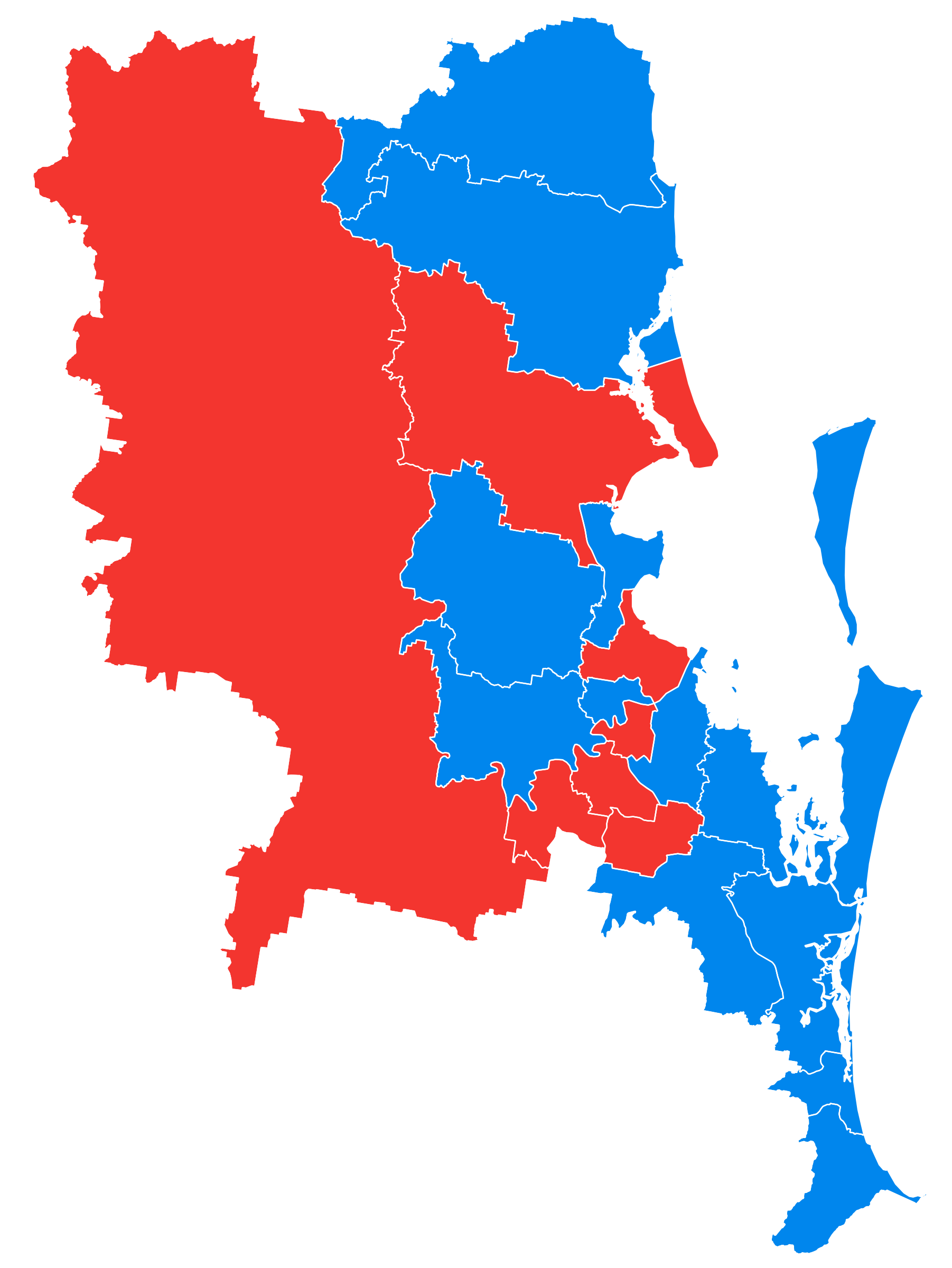

Party	Votes	%	Swing	Seats	Change
Liberal National Party	1,153,736	43.19	–2.47	21	▼1
Australian Labor Party	825,627	30.91	+1.14	8	▲2
Australian Greens	235,887	8.83	+2.61		
Pauline Hanson's One Nation	147,478	5.52	+5.42		
Family First Party	103,933	3.89	+1.85		
Katter's Australian Party	72,879	2.73	–1.02	1	0
Liberal Democratic Party	25,665	0.96	+0.96		
Australian Liberty Alliance	12,320	0.46	+0.46		
Nick Xenophon Team	11,032	0.41	+0.41		
Glenn Lazarus Team	10,094	0.38	+0.38		
Rise Up Australia Party	4,490	0.17	–0.22		
Drug Law Reform Australia	4,466	0.17	+0.17		
Australian Defence Veterans Party	2,912	0.11	+0.11		
CountryMinded	2,141	0.08	+0.08		
Consumer Rights & No-Tolls	2,050	0.08	+0.08		
Democratic Labour Party	1,566	0.06	+0.02		
The Arts Party	1,467	0.05	+0.05		
Online Direct Democracy	1,062	0.04	+0.04		
Mature Australia Party	902	0.03	+0.02		
Palmer United Party	315	0.01	−11.01	0	▼1
Independent	50,377	1.89	+1.51		
Non Affiliated	830	0.03	−0.12		
Total	2,671,229			30	
Two-party-preferred vote
Liberal National Party	1,445,030	54.10	−2.88	21	▼1
Australian Labor Party	1,226,199	45.90	+2.88	8	▲2

Liberal National to Labor: Herbert, Longman

Palmer to Liberal National: Fairfax

== Western Australia ==
2016 Australian federal election (Western Australia)
- 2 July 2016

All 16 Western Australian seats in the Australian House of Representatives and all 12 seats in the Australian Senate
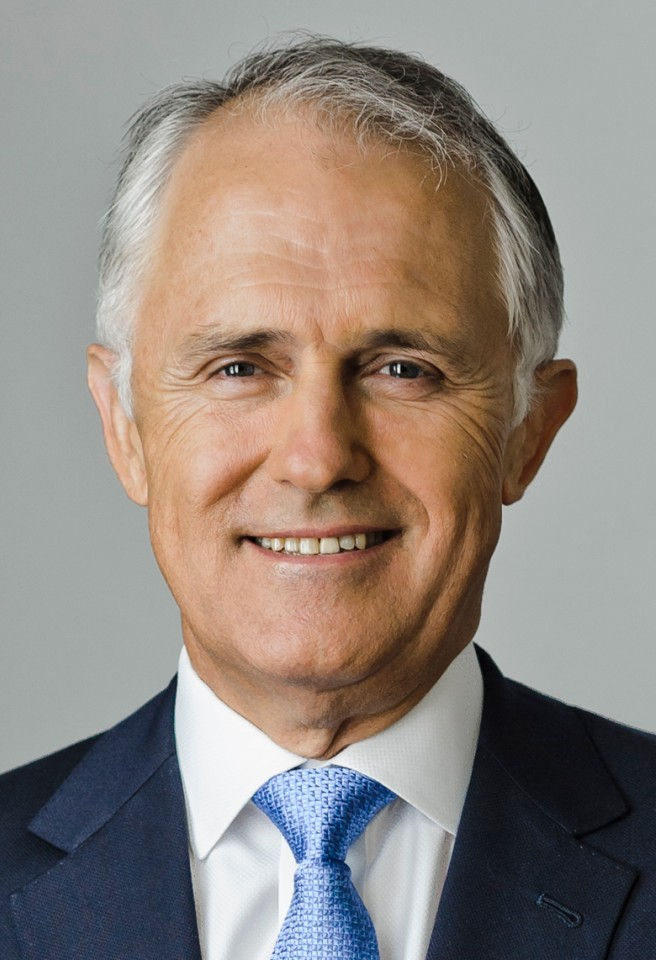

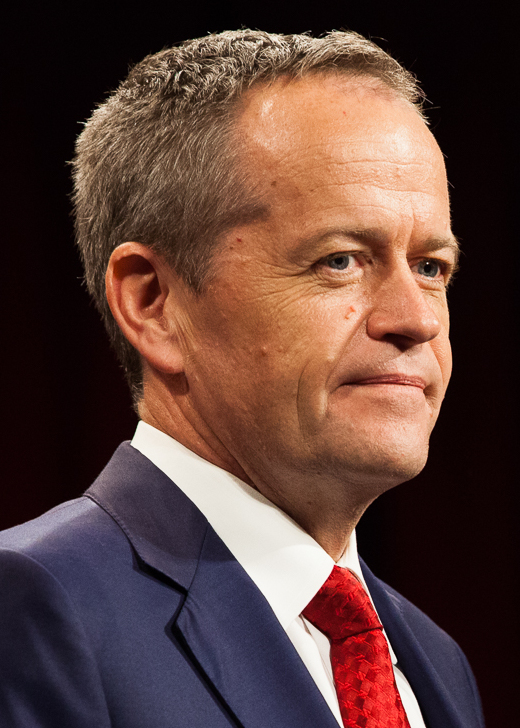
	First party	Second party
Leader	Malcolm Turnbull	Bill Shorten
Party	Liberal/National coalition	Labor
Last election	12 seats	3 seats
Seats won	11 seats	5 seats
Seat change	▼1	▲2
Percentage	48.70%	32.45%
Swing	▼1.61	▲3.69
TPP	54.66%	45.34%
TPP swing	▼3.62	▲3.62
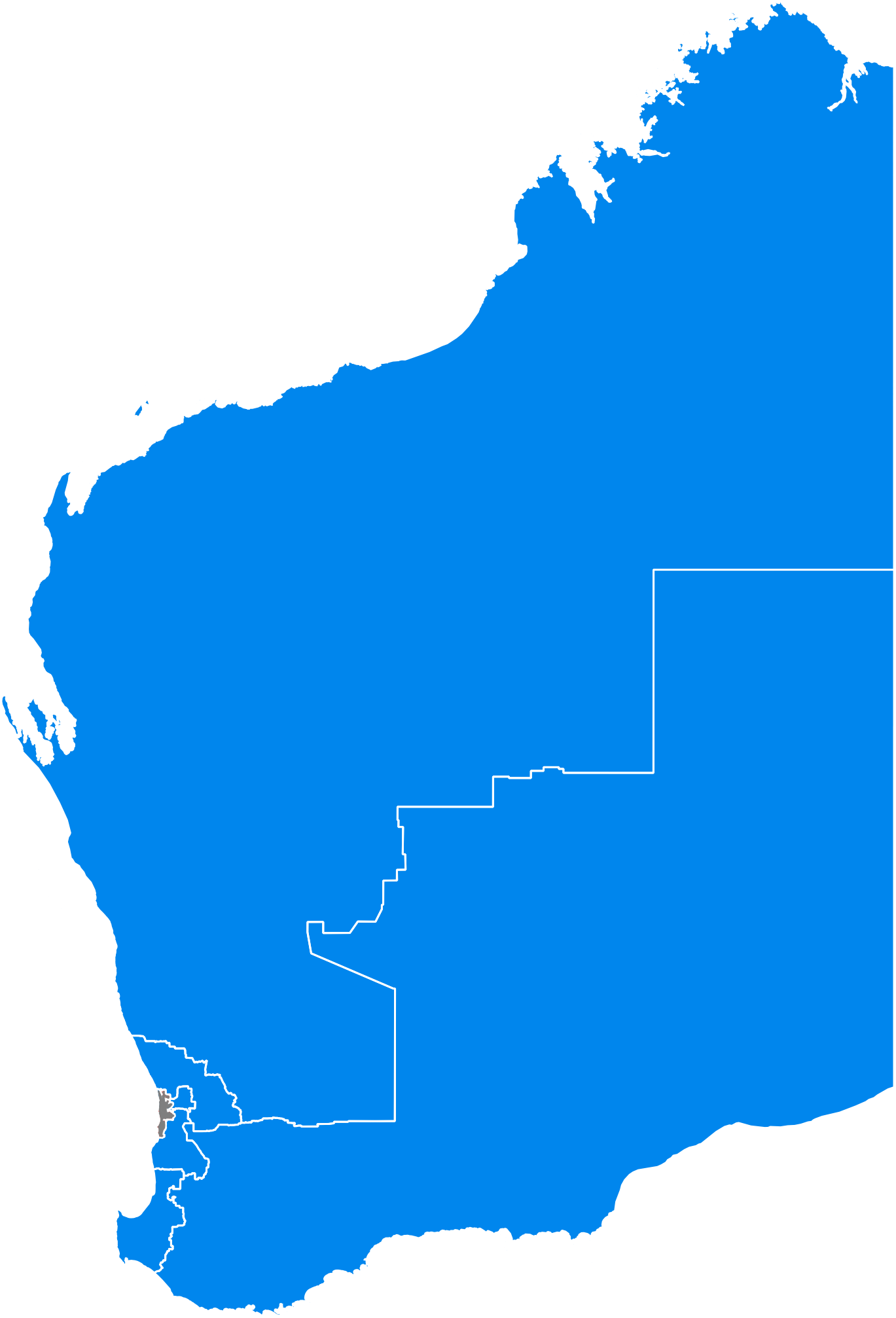
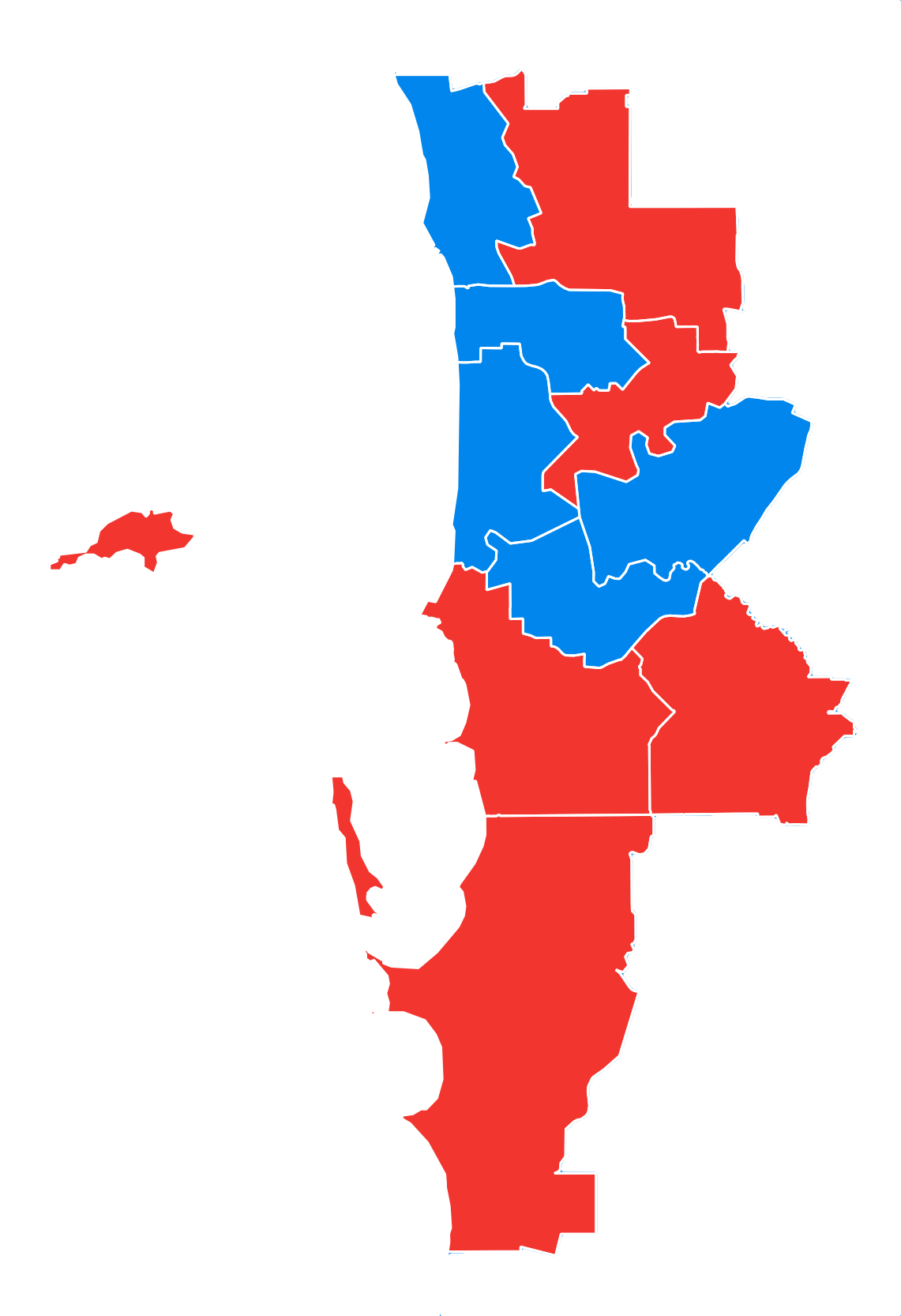

Party	Votes	%	Swing	Seats	Change
Liberal Party of Australia	611,605	45.70	–1.61	11	▼1
Australian Labor Party	434,318	32.45	+3.69	5	▲2
Australian Greens	161,443	12.06	+2.32		
National Party of Australia	40,160	3.00	−0.90		
Australian Christians	34,197	2.56	+0.53		
Rise Up Australia Party	20,859	1.56	+0.84		
Shooters, Fishers and Farmers Party	6,022	0.45	+0.45		
Mature Australia Party	3,203	0.24	+0.24		
Liberal Democratic Party	2,526	0.19	+0.19		
Outdoor Recreation Party	2,375	0.18	+0.18		
Australian Liberty Alliance	1,544	0.10	+0.10		
Socialist Alliance	1,404	0.10	+0.04		
Online Direct Democracy	1,300	0.10	+0.10		
Independent	17,381	1.30	+1.03		
Total	1,338,337			16	
Two-party-preferred vote
Liberal Party of Australia	731,497	54.66	−3.62	11	▼1
Australian Labor Party	606,840	45.34	+3.62	5	▲2

Liberal to Labor: Burt, Cowan

== South Australia ==
2016 Australian federal election (South Australia)
- 2 July 2016

All 11 South Australian seats in the Australian House of Representatives and all 12 seats in the Australian Senate
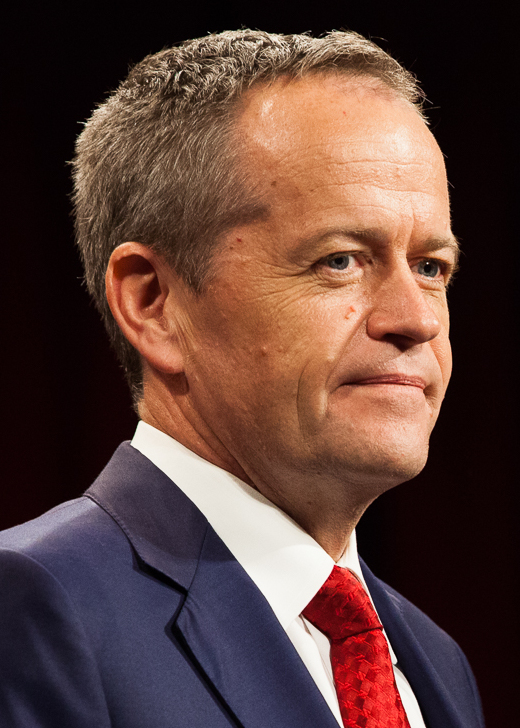

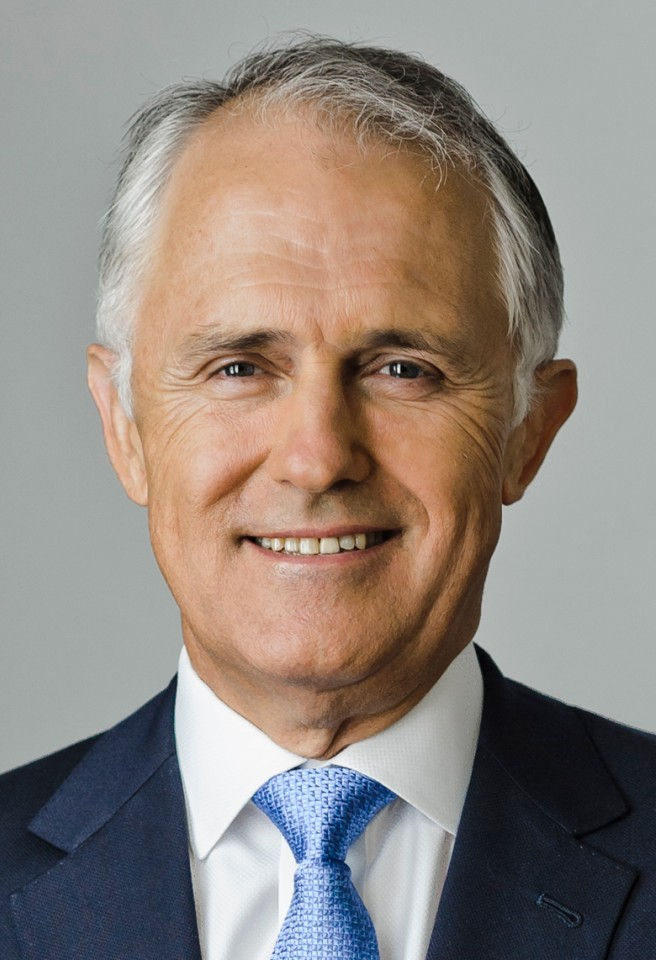

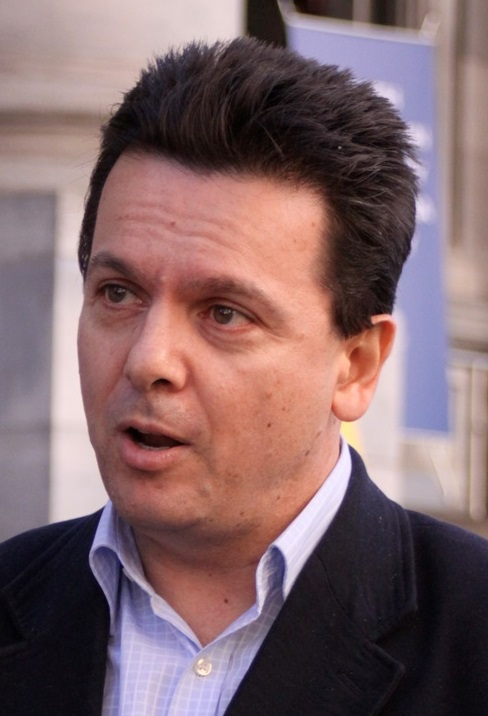
	First party	Second party	Third party
Leader	Bill Shorten	Malcolm Turnbull	Nick Xenophon
Party	Labor	Liberal/National coalition	Xenophon Team
Leader since			1 June 2013
Last election	5 seats	6 seats	new party
Seats won	6 seats	4 seats	1 seat
Seat change	▲1	▼2	▲1
Percentage	31.55%	35.09%	21.26%
Swing	▼4.18	▼9.40	▲21.26
TPP	52.27%	47.73%
TPP swing	▲4.63	▼4.63
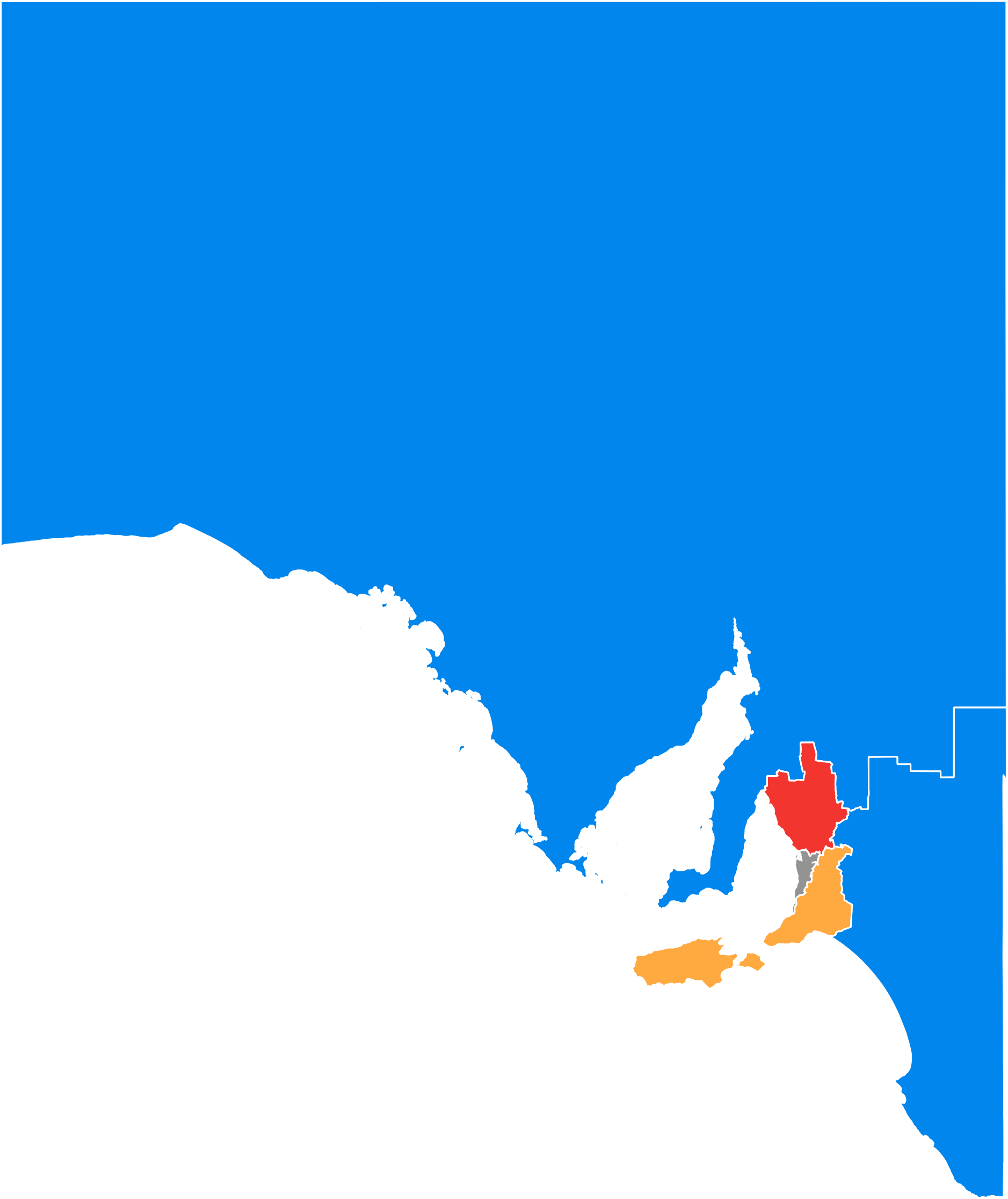
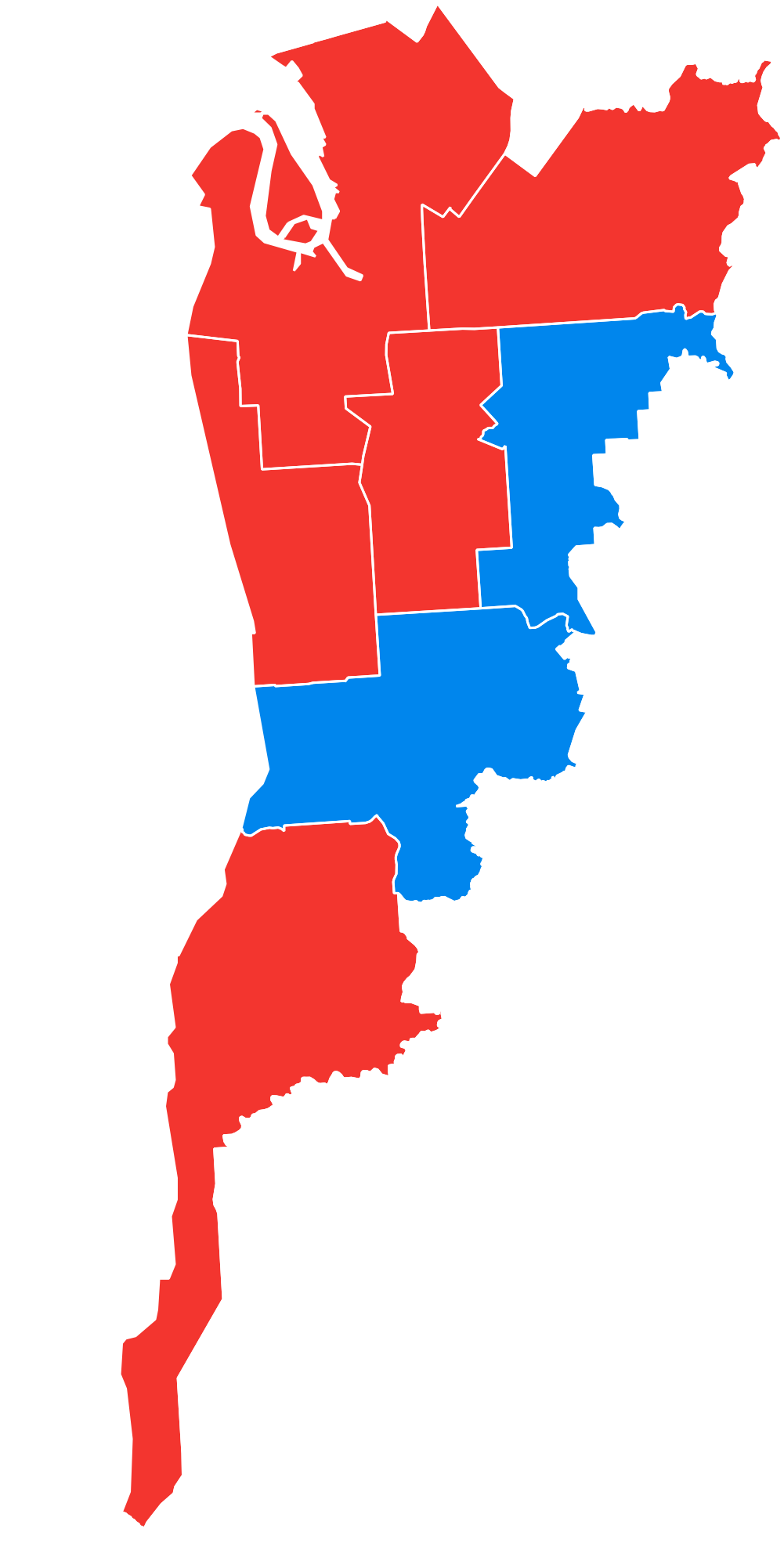

Party	Votes	%	Swing	Seats	Change
Liberal Party of Australia	365,155	35.09	–9.40	4	▼2
Australian Labor Party	328,314	31.55	–4.18	6	▲1
Nick Xenophon Team	221,210	21.26	+21.26	1	▲1
Australian Greens	64,605	6.21	−2.07		
Family First Party	40,941	3.93	−1.48		
Animal Justice Party	8,881	0.85	+0.85		
Liberal Democratic Party	2,178	0.21	+0.21		
Christian Democratic Party	1,715	0.16	+0.16		
Independent	7,737	0.74	−0.54		
Total	1,040,736			11	
Two-party-preferred vote
Australian Labor Party	544,017	52.27	+4.63	6	▲1
Liberal Party of Australia	496,719	47.73	−4.63	4	▼2

Liberal to Labor: Hindmarsh

Liberal to Xenophon: Mayo

== Tasmania ==
2016 Australian federal election (Tasmania)
- 2 July 2016

All 5 Tasmanian seats in the Australian House of Representatives and all 12 seats in the Australian Senate
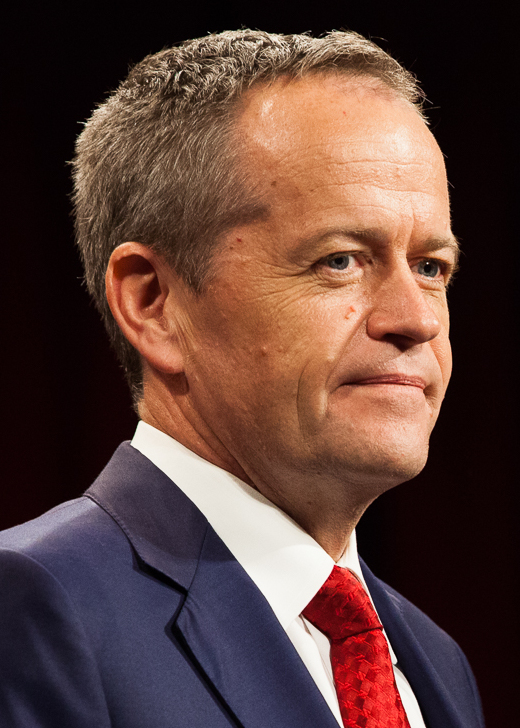

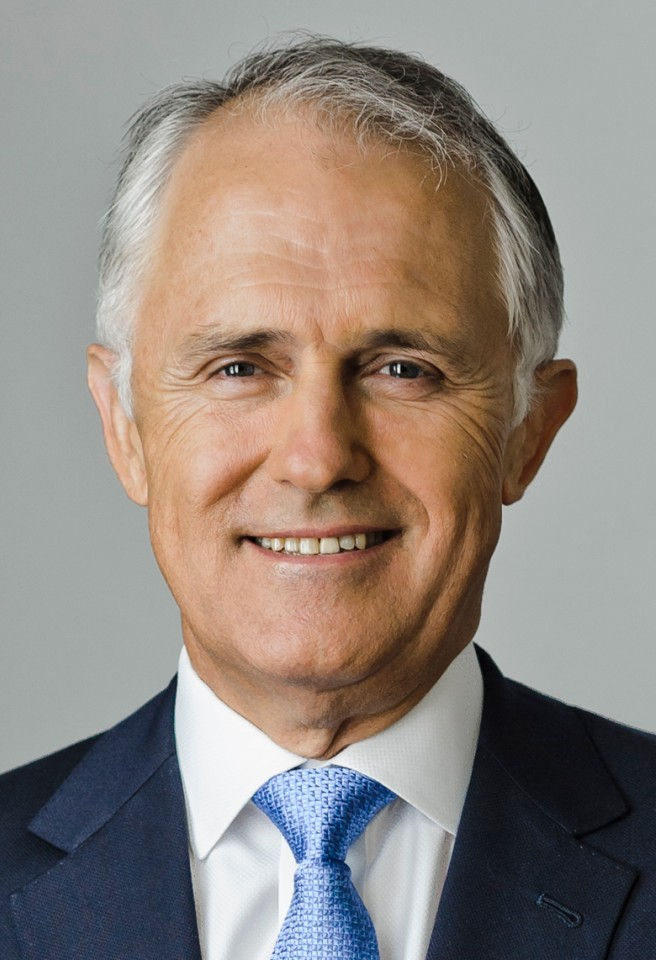
	First party	Second party
Leader	Bill Shorten	Malcolm Turnbull
Party	Labor	Liberal
Last election	1 seat	3 seats
Seats won	4 seats	0 seats
Seat change	▲3	▼3
Percentage	37.90%	35.44%
Swing	▲3.09	▼4.82
TPP	57.36%	42.64%
TPP swing	▲6.13	▼6.13
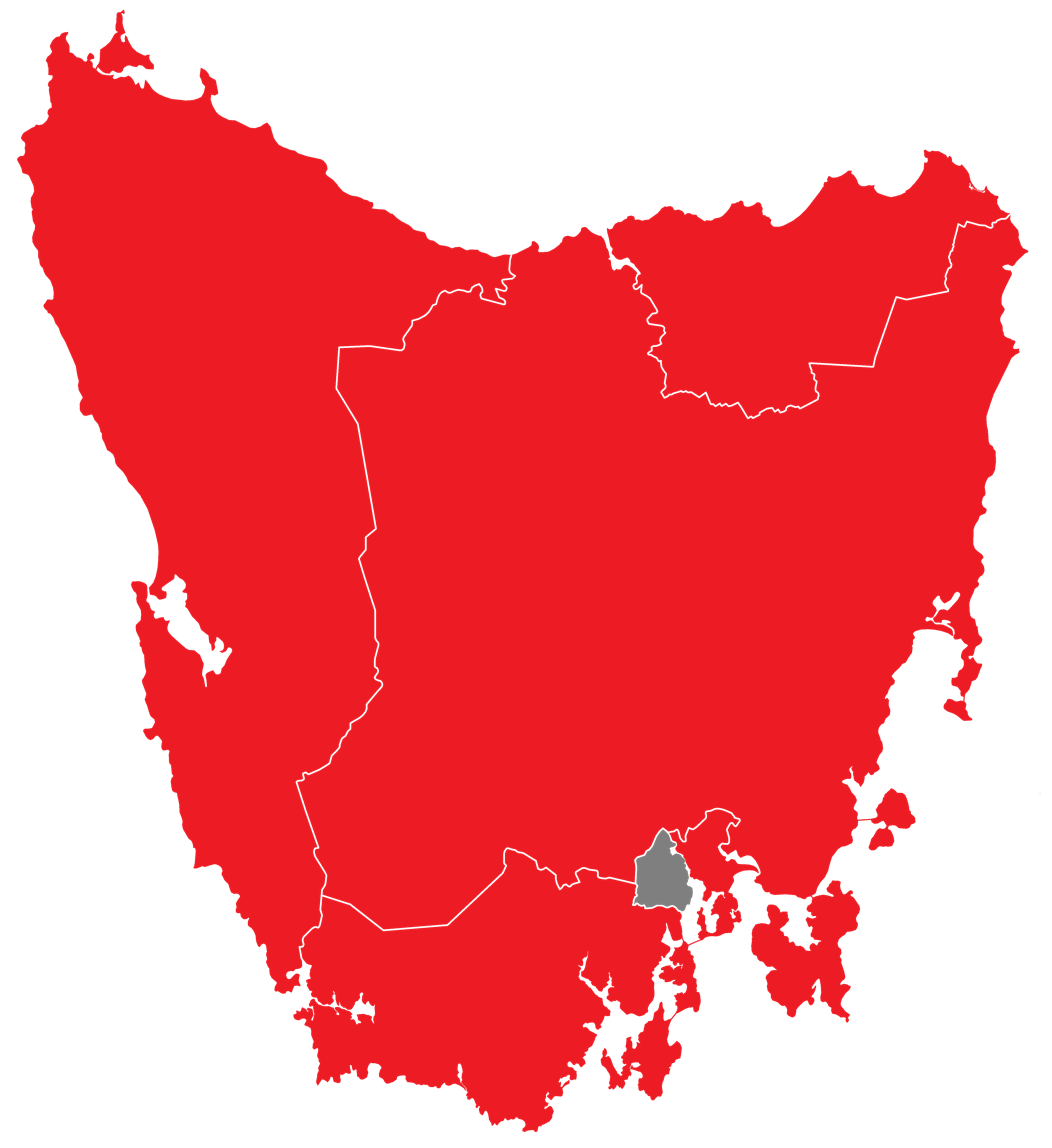

This is a list of electoral division results for the 2016 Australian federal election in the state of Tasmania.

Party	Votes	%	Swing	Seats	Change
Australian Labor Party	127,186	37.90	+3.09	4	▲3
Liberal Party of Australia	118,956	35.44	–4.82	0	▼3
Australian Greens	34,291	10.22	+1.90		
Australian Recreational Fishers Party	11,254	3.35	+3.35		
Christian Democratic Party	6,345	1.89	+1.89		
Renewable Energy Party	4,534	1.35	+1.35		
The Arts Party	1,673	0.50	+0.50		
Liberal Democratic Party	1,380	0.41	+0.41		
Democratic Labour Party	632	0.19	+0.02		
Independent	29,372	8.75	+1.28	1	Steady
Total	335,623			5	
Two-party-preferred vote
Australian Labor Party	192,530	57.36	+6.13	4	▲3
Liberal Party of Australia	143,093	42.64	−6.13	0	▼3

Liberal to Labor: Bass, Braddon, Lyons

== Territories ==
=== Australian Capital Territory ===
2016 Australian federal election (Australian Capital Territory)
- 2 July 2016

All 2 Australian Capital Territory seats in the Australian House of Representatives and all 2 seats in the Australian Senate
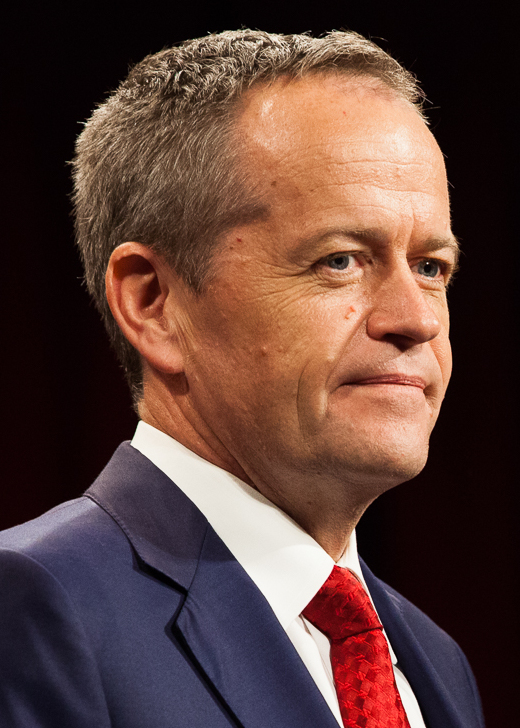

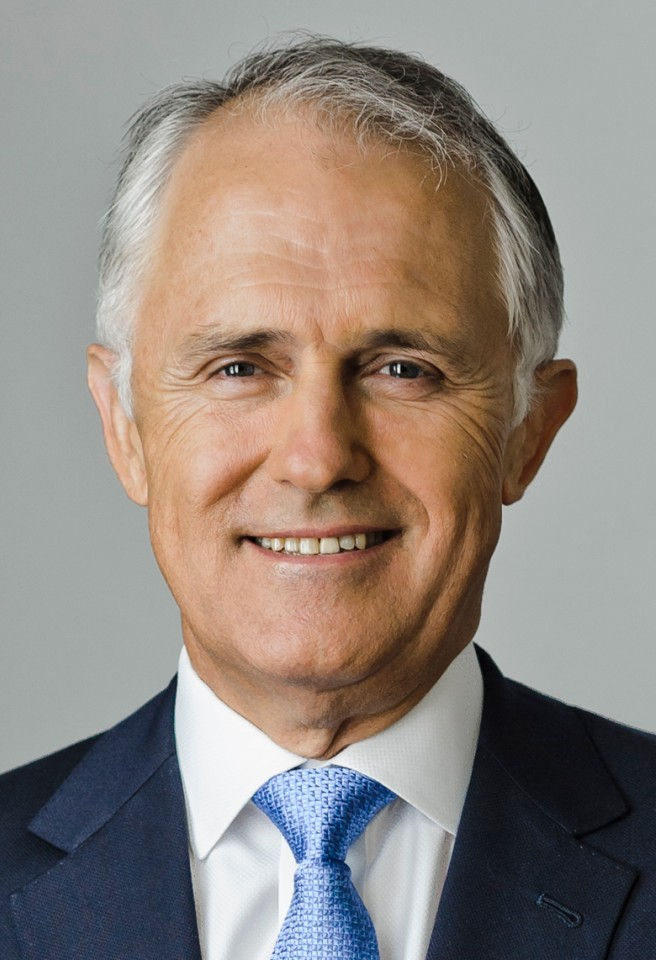
	First party	Second party
Leader	Bill Shorten	Malcolm Turnbull
Party	Labor	Liberal
Last election	2 seats	0 seats
Seats won	2 seats	0 seats
Seat change	0	0
Percentage	61.13%	38.87%
Swing	▲1.22	▼1.22
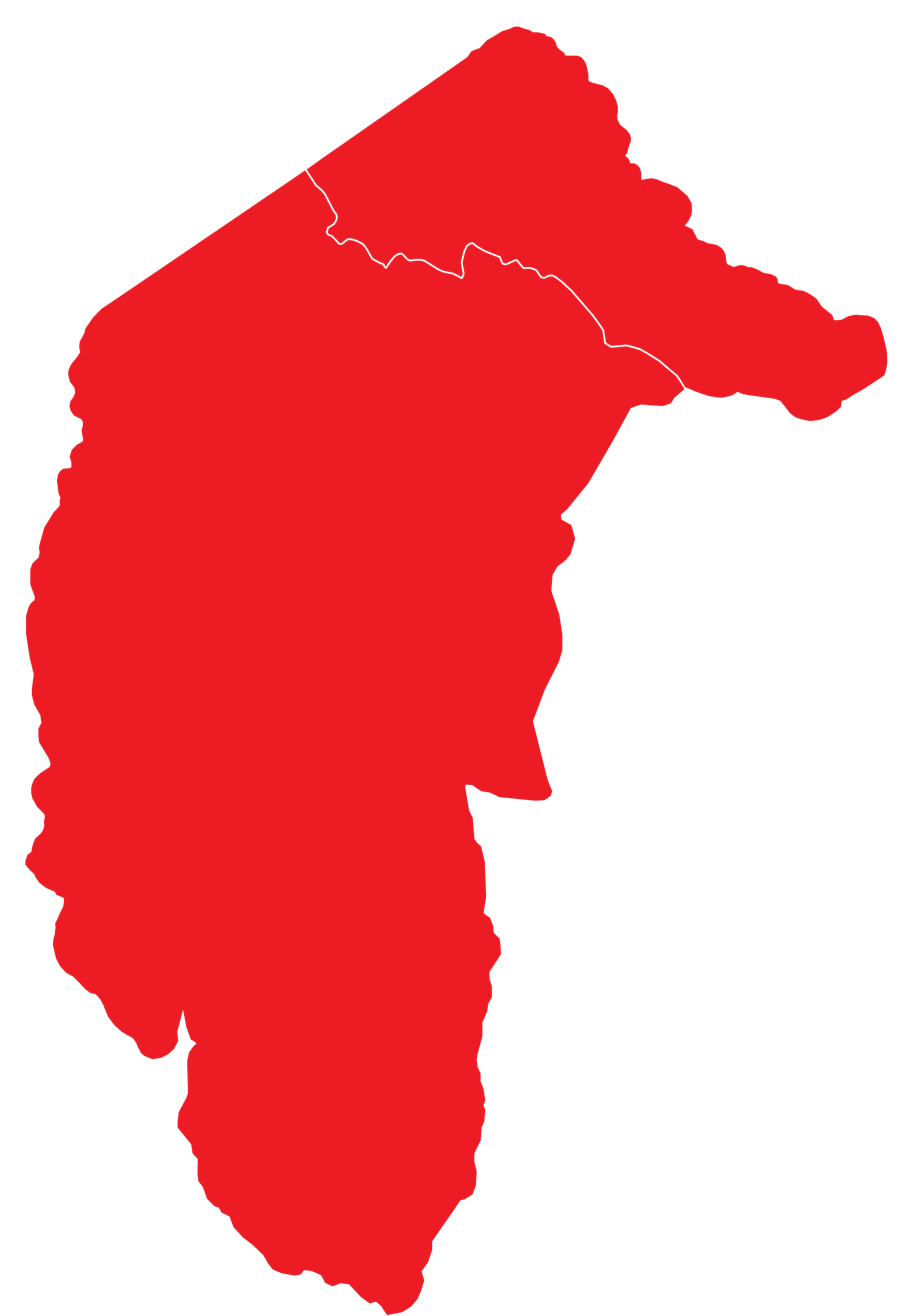

Party	Votes	%	Swing	Seats	Change
Australian Labor Party	111,887	44.27	+1.34	2	Steady
Liberal Party of Australia	87,346	34.56	–0.06	0	Steady
Australian Greens	38,129	15.09	+1.69		
Bullet Train for Australia	10,673	4.22	+0.14		
Independent	4,707	1.86	+1.86		
Total	252,742			2	
Two-party-preferred vote
Australian Labor Party	154,489	61.13	+1.22	2	0
Liberal Party of Australia	98,253	38.87	−1.22	0	0

=== Northern Territory ===
2016 Australian federal election (Northern Territory)
- 2 July 2016

All 2 Northern Territory seats in the Australian House of Representatives and all 2 seats in the Australian Senate
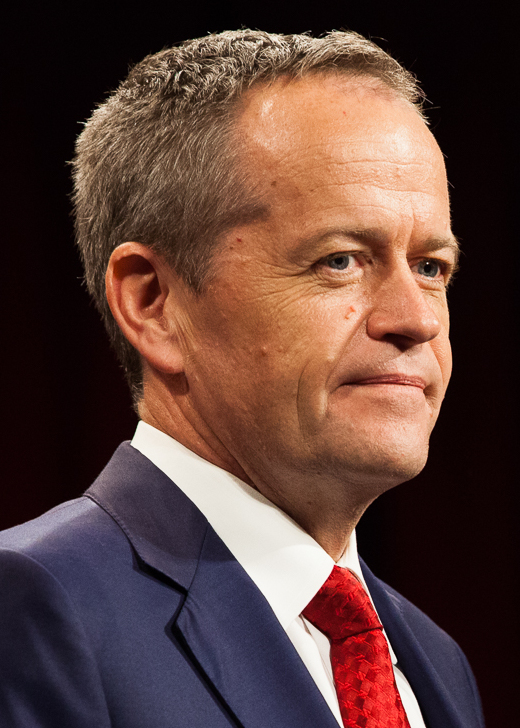

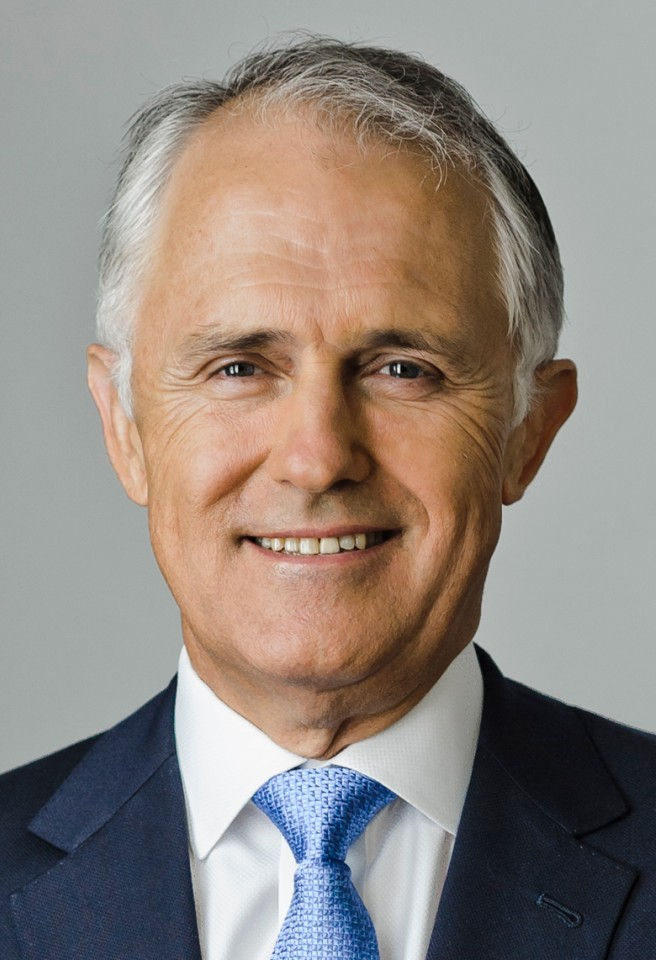
	First party	Second party
Leader	Bill Shorten	Malcolm Turnbull
Party	Labor	Liberal/National coalition
Last election	1 seat	1 seat
Seats won	2 seats	0 seats
Seat change	▲1	▼1
Percentage	57.06%	42.94%
Swing	▲7.41	▼7.41
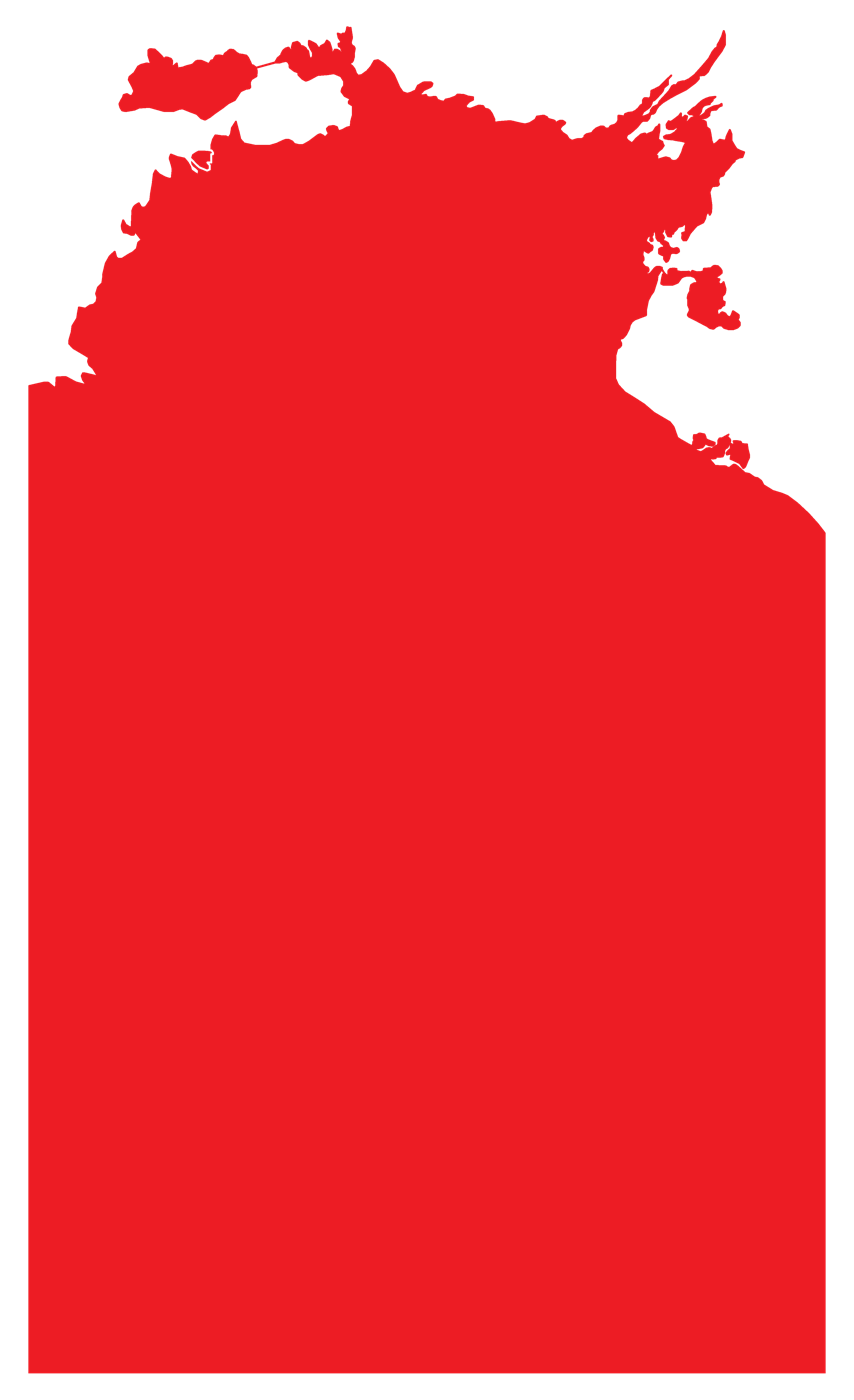

Party	Votes	%	Swing	Seats	Change
Australian Labor Party	39,364	40.39	+2.96	2	▲1
Country Liberal Party	32,409	33.25	–8.45	0	▼1
Australian Greens	8,858	9.09	+1.20		
Shooters, Fishers and Farmers Party	4,584	4.70	+4.70		
Rise Up Australia Party	2,483	2.55	+1.10		
Liberal Democratic Party	1,275	1.31	+1.31		
Help End Marijuana Prohibition (HEMP) Party	1,143	1.17	+1.17		
Australia First Party	798	0.82	+0.82		
Citizens Electoral Council	444	0.46	−1.41		
Online Direct Democracy	369	0.38	+0.38		
Independent	5,733	5.88	+5.13		
Total	97,460			2	
Two-party-preferred vote
Australian Labor Party	55,614	57.06	+7.41	2	▲1
Country Liberal Party	41,846	42.94	−7.41	0	▼1

Country Liberal to Labor: Solomon

== Two party preferred preference flow ==
House of Representatives (IRV – Turnout 89.82% (CV)
Party	Liberal National coalition			Labor Party		
Party	Votes	%	±	Votes	%	±
Greens	250,263	18.06%	+1.09	1,135,387	81.94%	–1.09
One Nation	88,327	50.47%	–4.63	86,693	49.53%	+4.63
United Australia Party	117	37.14%	–16.53	198	62.86%	+16.53
Family First Party	120,195	59.73%		81,027	40.27%	
Liberal Democratic Party	46,458	70.11%	–9.45	19,803	29.89%	+9.45
Christian Democratic Party	129,463	72.72%	+1.21	48,563	27.28%	–1.21
Democratic Labour Party	1,132	35.75%	–7.76	2,034	64.25%	+7.76
Rise Up Australia Party	36,239	52.97%	–7.26	32,179	47.03%	+7.26
Australia First Party	3,161	45.84%	–13.89	3,734	54.16%	+13.89
Animal Justice Party	35,204	37.25%	+5.62	59,312	62.75%	–5.62
Australian Federation Party						
Katter's Australian	38,656	53.04%	–0.96	34,223	46.96%	+0.96
Centre Alliance	99,564	39.77%	–	150,769	60.23%	–
Australian Christians	31,186	72.27%	+2.22	11,964	27.73%	–2.22
Australian Liberty Alliance	17,294	68.26%	–	8,043	31.74%	–
Shooters, Fishers and Farmers Party	7,090	45.81%	–	8,387	54.19%	–
Socialist Alliance	948	25.95%	+6.95	2,705	74.05%	–6.95
Socialist Equality Party	549	34.14%		1,059	65.86%	
Derryn Hinch's Justice Party	8,276	49.01%	–	8,609	50.99%	–
Australian Citizens Party	2,715	52.46%	+3.08	2,460	47.54%	–3.08
Sustainable Australia	312	51.49%	–	294	48.51%	–
Australian Defence Veterans Party	2,194	50.32%	–	2,166	49.68%	–
Australian Country Party	4,333	61.61%	–	2,700	38.39%	–
CountryMinded	2,086	59.98%	–	1,392	40.02%	–
Non-Custodial Parents Party	1,392	38.00%	–	2,271	62.00%	–
Australian Antipaedophile Party	889	58.22%	–	638	41.78%	–
Outdoor Recreation Party (Stop The Greens)	1,354	57.01%	–	1,021	42.99%	–
Bullet Train for Australia	6,122	43.49%	–	7,956	56.51%	–
Drug Law Reform Australia	7,376	36.25%	–	12,974	63.75%	–
Australian Recreational Fishers Party	4,161	36.97%	–	7,093	63.03%	–
Glenn Lazarus Team	3,873	38.37%	–	6,221	61.63%	–
Renewable Energy Party	3,122	36.13%	–	5,520	63.87%	–
Online Direct Democracy	3,517	41.32%	–	4,994	58.68%	–
Arts Party	2,429	35.61%	–	4,392	64.39%	–
Mature Australia Party	3,028	51.43%	–	2,860	48.57%	–
HEMP Party	431	37.71%	–	712	62.29%	–
Voluntary Euthanasia Party	420	43.17%	–	553	56.83%	–
Australian Cyclists Party	304	35.93%	–	542	64.07%	–
Science Party	5,136	34.27%	–	9,852	65.73%	–
Australian Progressives	133	47.16%	–	149	52.84%	–
Australian Equality Party (Marriage)	1,338	40.59%	–	1,958	59.41%	–
Consumer Rights & No-Tolls	879	42.88%	–	1,171	57.12%	–
Smokers' Rights Party	506	37.68%	–	837	62.32%	–
Reason Party	2,776	31.21%	–	6,119	68.79%	–
Independents	194,826	40.60%	–2.30	285,010	59.40%	+2.30
Total	14,659,042	100.00		151	Steady	
Two-party-preferred vote
Liberal/National Coalition	6,818,824	50.36%	−3.13			
Labor	6,722,277	49.64%	+3.13			
Invalid/blank votes	802,376	5.19%	–0.35	–	–	–
Turnout	15,461,418	89.82%	–2.07	–	–	–
Registered voters	17,213,433	–	–	–	–	–
Source: AEC for both votes

== Maps ==
=== Results by electoral division ===
First preference vote

Two-candidate-preferred vote

=== Results by state and territory ===
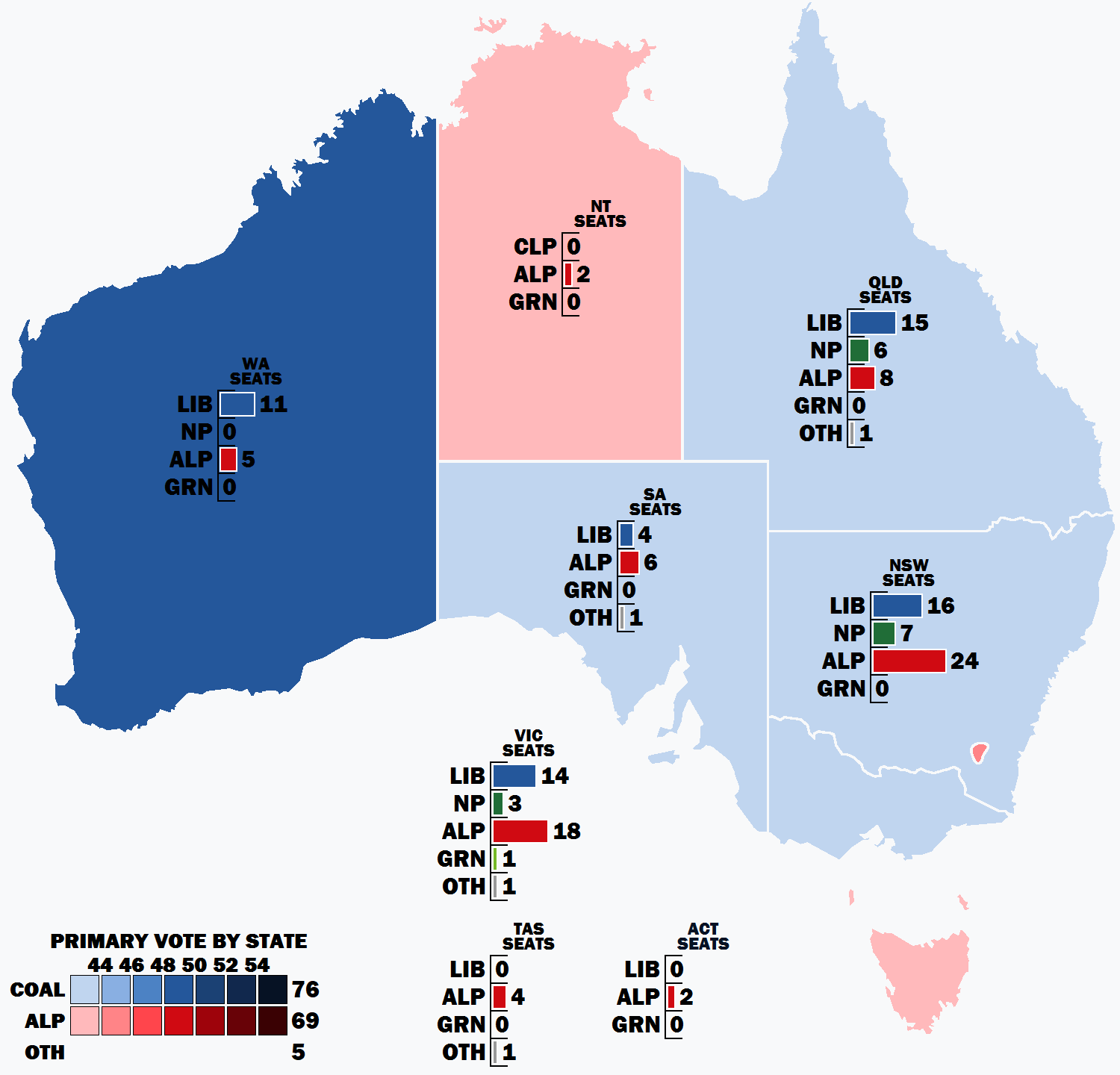
First preference vote and seat totals

== See also ==
- Results of the 2016 Australian federal election (Senate)
- Post-election pendulum for the 2016 Australian federal election
- Members of the Australian House of Representatives, 2016–2019
