= Post-election pendulum for the 2016 Australian federal election =

The Coalition won the 2016 federal election with a one-seat majority 76 of 150 lower house seats. Labor holds 69 seats while crossbenchers hold the remaining five.

Classification of seats as marginal, fairly safe or safe is applied by the independent Australian Electoral Commission using the following definition: "Where a winning party receives less than 56% of the vote, the seat is classified as 'marginal', 56–60% is classified as 'fairly safe' and more than 60% is considered 'safe'."

== Pendulum ==
The Mackerras pendulum was devised by the Australian psephologist Malcolm Mackerras as a way of predicting the outcome of an election contested between two major parties in a Westminster style lower house legislature such as the Australian House of Representatives, which is composed of single-member electorates and which uses a preferential voting system such as a Condorcet method or IRV.

The pendulum works by lining up all of the seats held in Parliament for the government, the opposition and the crossbenches according to the percentage point margin they are held by on a two party preferred basis. This is also known as the swing required for the seat to change hands. Given a uniform swing to the opposition or government parties, the number of seats that change hands can be predicted.

Government seats (76)
Marginal (28)
Capricornia (Qld)	Michelle Landry	LNP	0.63
Forde (Qld)	Bert van Manen	LNP	0.63
Gilmore (NSW)	Ann Sudmalis	LIB	0.73
Flynn (Qld)	Ken O'Dowd	LNP	1.04
Robertson (NSW)	Lucy Wicks	LIB	1.14
Chisholm (Vic)	Julia Banks	LIB	1.24
Dunkley (Vic)	Chris Crewther	LIB	1.43
Banks (NSW)	David Coleman	LIB	1.44
La Trobe (Vic)	Jason Wood	LIB	1.46
Dickson (Qld)	Peter Dutton	LNP	1.60
Petrie (Qld)	Luke Howarth	LNP	1.65
Grey (SA)	Rowan Ramsey	LIB	1.95 v NXT
Hasluck (WA)	Ken Wyatt	LIB	2.05
Page (NSW)	Kevin Hogan	NAT	2.30
Corangamite (Vic)	Sarah Henderson	LIB	3.13
Dawson (Qld)	George Christensen	LNP	3.34
Bonner (Qld)	Ross Vasta	LNP	3.39
Boothby (SA)	Nicolle Flint	LIB	3.50
Swan (WA)	Steve Irons	LIB	3.59
Pearce (WA)	Christian Porter	LIB	3.63
Leichhardt (Qld)	Warren Entsch	LNP	3.95
Cowper (NSW)	Luke Hartsuyker	NAT	4.56 v IND
Reid (NSW)	Craig Laundy	LIB	4.69
Barker (SA)	Tony Pasin	LIB	4.74 v NXT
Murray (Vic)	Damian Drum	NAT	5.13 v LIB
Deakin (Vic)	Michael Sukkar	LIB	5.68
Sturt (SA)	Christopher Pyne	LIB	5.89
Brisbane (Qld)	Trevor Evans	LNP	5.92
Fairly safe (17)
McMillan (Vic)	Russell Broadbent	LIB	6.03
Casey (Vic)	Tony Smith	LIB	6.06
Stirling (WA)	Michael Keenan	LIB	6.12
Canning (WA)	Andrew Hastie	LIB	6.79
Bowman (Qld)	Andrew Laming	LNP	7.07
Flinders (Vic)	Greg Hunt	LIB	7.77
Higgins (Vic)	Kelly O'Dwyer	LIB	7.99 v GRN
Wide Bay (Qld)	Llew O'Brien	LNP	8.14
Hinkler (Qld)	Keith Pitt	LNP	8.42
New England (NSW)	Barnaby Joyce	NAT	8.52 v IND
Aston (Vic)	Alan Tudge	LIB	8.59
Wannon (Vic)	Dan Tehan	LIB	8.96
Fisher (Qld)	Andrew Wallace	LNP	9.06
Ryan (Qld)	Jane Prentice	LNP	9.09
Hughes (NSW)	Craig Kelly	LIB	9.33
Wright (Qld)	Scott Buchholz	LNP	9.62
Bennelong (NSW)	John Alexander	LIB	9.72
Safe (31)
Hume (NSW)	Angus Taylor	LIB	10.18
Menzies (Vic)	Kevin Andrews	LIB	10.56
Fairfax (Qld)	Ted O'Brien	LNP	10.89
Moore (WA)	Ian Goodenough	LIB	11.02
Fadden (Qld)	Stuart Robert	LNP	11.05
Durack (WA)	Melissa Price	LIB	11.06
Tangney (WA)	Ben Morton	LIB	11.07
Warringah (NSW)	Tony Abbott	LIB	11.55 v GRN
Lyne (NSW)	David Gillespie	NAT	11.63
McPherson (Qld)	Karen Andrews	LNP	11.64
Calare (NSW)	Andrew Gee	NAT	11.81
Forrest (WA)	Nola Marino	LIB	12.56
Goldstein (Vic)	Tim Wilson	LIB	12.68
Kooyong (Vic)	Josh Frydenberg	LIB	13.34
North Sydney (NSW)	Trent Zimmerman	LIB	13.61
Moncrieff (Qld)	Steven Ciobo	LNP	14.94
O'Connor (WA)	Rick Wilson	LIB	15.04
Parkes (NSW)	Mark Coulton	NAT	15.10
Groom (Qld)	John McVeigh	LNP	15.31
Cook (NSW)	Scott Morrison	LIB	15.39
Mackellar (NSW)	Jason Falinski	LIB	15.74
Maranoa (Qld)	David Littleproud	LNP	15.86 v ONP
Riverina (NSW)	Michael McCormack	NAT	16.44
Berowra (NSW)	Julian Leeser	LIB	16.45
Wentworth (NSW)	Malcolm Turnbull	LIB	17.75
Mitchell (NSW)	Alex Hawke	LIB	17.82
Gippsland (Vic)	Darren Chester	NAT	18.43
Farrer (NSW)	Sussan Ley	LIB	20.53
Curtin (WA)	Julie Bishop	LIB	20.70
Bradfield (NSW)	Paul Fletcher	LIB	21.04
Mallee (Vic)	Andrew Broad	NAT	21.32

Opposition seats (69)
Marginal (23)
Herbert (Qld)	Cathy O'Toole	ALP	0.02
Hindmarsh (SA)	Steve Georganas	ALP	0.58
Cowan (WA)	Anne Aly	ALP	0.68
Longman (Qld)	Susan Lamb	ALP	0.79
Batman (Vic)	David Feeney	ALP	1.03 v GRN
Lindsay (NSW)	Emma Husar	ALP	1.38
Melbourne Ports (Vic)	Michael Danby	ALP	1.38
Griffith (Qld)	Terri Butler	ALP	1.60
Macquarie (NSW)	Susan Templeman	ALP	2.19
Braddon (Tas)	Justine Keay	ALP	2.20
Lyons (Tas)	Brian Mitchell	ALP	2.31
Eden-Monaro (NSW)	Mike Kelly	ALP	2.93
Perth (WA)	Tim Hammond	ALP	3.33
Bendigo (Vic)	Lisa Chesters	ALP	3.74
Richmond (NSW)	Justine Elliot	ALP	3.96
Moreton (Qld)	Graham Perrett	ALP	4.02
Bruce (Vic)	Julian Hill	ALP	4.08
Adelaide (SA)	Kate Ellis	ALP	4.65
Jagajaga (Vic)	Jenny Macklin	ALP	4.67
Dobell (NSW)	Emma McBride	ALP	4.81
Wills (Vic)	Peter Khalil	ALP	4.88 v GRN
Lilley (Qld)	Wayne Swan	ALP	5.32
Isaacs (Vic)	Mark Dreyfus	ALP	5.73
Fairly safe (20)
Solomon (NT)	Luke Gosling	ALP	6.00
Bass (Tas)	Ross Hart	ALP	6.09
Greenway (NSW)	Michelle Rowland	ALP	6.31
Burt (WA)	Matt Keogh	ALP	7.11
Ballarat (Vic)	Catherine King	ALP	7.32
Hotham (Vic)	Clare O'Neil	ALP	7.48
Fremantle (WA)	Josh Wilson	ALP	7.52
Parramatta (NSW)	Julie Owens	ALP	7.67
McEwen (Vic)	Rob Mitchell	ALP	7.85
Werriwa (NSW)	Anne Stanley	ALP	8.20
Barton (NSW)	Linda Burney	ALP	8.30
Macarthur (NSW)	Mike Freelander	ALP	8.33
Lingiari (NT)	Warren Snowdon	ALP	8.42
Canberra (ACT)	Gai Brodtmann	ALP	8.46
Kingsford Smith (NSW)	Matt Thistlethwaite	ALP	8.57
Blair (Qld)	Shayne Neumann	ALP	8.88
Oxley (Qld)	Milton Dick	ALP	9.08
Makin (SA)	Tony Zappia	ALP	9.65
Shortland (NSW)	Pat Conroy	ALP	9.94
Corio (Vic)	Richard Marles	ALP	9.99
Safe (26)
Franklin (Tas)	Julie Collins	ALP	10.72
Paterson (NSW)	Meryl Swanson	ALP	10.74
Wakefield (SA)	Nick Champion	ALP	10.97
Rankin (Qld)	Jim Chalmers	ALP	11.30
Brand (WA)	Madeleine King	ALP	11.43
McMahon (NSW)	Chris Bowen	ALP	12.11
Maribyrnong (Vic)	Bill Shorten	ALP	12.31
Hunter (NSW)	Joel Fitzgibbon	ALP	12.46
Cunningham (NSW)	Sharon Bird	ALP	13.32
Lalor (Vic)	Joanne Ryan	ALP	13.44
Whitlam (NSW)	Stephen Jones	ALP	13.72
Newcastle (NSW)	Sharon Claydon	ALP	13.84
Fenner (ACT)	Andrew Leigh	ALP	13.89
Holt (Vic)	Anthony Byrne	ALP	14.17
Port Adelaide (SA)	Mark Butler	ALP	14.86 v NXT
Sydney (NSW)	Tanya Plibersek	ALP	15.31
Grayndler (NSW)	Anthony Albanese	ALP	15.82 v GRN
Kingston (SA)	Amanda Rishworth	ALP	17.05
Scullin (Vic)	Andrew Giles	ALP	17.28
Fowler (NSW)	Chris Hayes	ALP	17.49
Watson (NSW)	Tony Burke	ALP	17.58
Calwell (Vic)	Maria Vamvakinou	ALP	17.87
Gellibrand (Vic)	Tim Watts	ALP	18.23
Chifley (NSW)	Ed Husic	ALP	19.19
Gorton (Vic)	Brendan O'Connor	ALP	19.45
Blaxland (NSW)	Jason Clare	ALP	19.48
Crossbench seats (5)
Indi (Vic)	Cathy McGowan	IND	4.83 v LIB
Mayo (SA)	Rebekha Sharkie	NXT	4.97 v LIB
Kennedy (Qld)	Bob Katter	KAP	11.12 v LNP
Denison (Tas)	Andrew Wilkie	IND	17.78 v ALP
Melbourne (Vic)	Adam Bandt	GRN	18.48 v LIB
