= Electoral results for the Division of Robertson =

Electoral results in Australian federal elections

This is a list of electoral results for the Division of Robertson in Australian federal elections from the division's creation in 1901 until the present.

== Members ==
Member	Party	Term
Henry Willis	Free Trade, Anti-Socialist	1901–1909
Henry Willis	Liberal	1909–1910
William Johnson	Labor	1910–1913
William Fleming	Liberal	1913–1916
William Fleming	Nationalist	1916–1921
William Fleming	Country	1921–1922
Sydney Gardner	Nationalist	1922–1931
Sydney Gardner	United Australia	1931–1940
Eric Spooner	United Australia	1940–1943
Thomas Williams	Labor	1943–1949
Roger Dean	Liberal	1949–1964
William Bridges-Maxwell	Liberal	1964–1969
Barry Cohen	Labor	1969–1990
Frank Walker	Labor	1990–1996
Jim Lloyd	Liberal	1996–2007
Belinda Neal	Labor	2007–2010
Deborah O'Neill	Labor	2010–2013
Lucy Wicks	Liberal	2013–2022
Gordon Reid	Labor	2022–present

== Election results ==
=== Elections in the 2020s ===
==== 2025 ====
2025 Australian federal election: Robertson
Party	Candidate	Votes	%	±%
One Nation	Matt Lloyd			
Greens	Cheryl Wallace			
Liberal	Lucy Wicks			
Legalise Cannabis	Tom Lillicrap			
Independent	Lisa Bellamy			
Trumpet of Patriots	David Borg			
Labor	Gordon Reid			
Total formal votes				
Informal votes				
Turnout				

==== 2022 ====
2022 Australian federal election: Robertson
Party	Candidate	Votes	%	±%
Liberal	Lucy Wicks	38,448	39.96	−6.90
Labor	Gordon Reid	36,231	37.66	+3.56
Greens	Shelly McGrath	9,642	10.02	+2.11
One Nation	Billy O'Grady	3,679	3.82	+3.82
United Australia	Barbara-Jane Murray	2,792	2.90	+0.09
Animal Justice	Patrick Murphy	1,949	2.03	−0.05
Indigenous-Aboriginal	Jeffrey Lawson	1,127	1.17	+1.17
Informed Medical Options	Kate Mason	1,114	1.16	+1.16
Liberal Democrats	Bentley Logan	736	0.76	+0.76
Citizens	Paul Borthwick	272	0.28	+0.28
Federation	Alexandra Hafner	220	0.23	+0.23
Total formal votes		96,210	93.88	+1.12
Informal votes		6,274	6.12	−1.12
Turnout		102,484	91.07	−2.10
Two-party-preferred result
Labor	Gordon Reid	50,277	52.26	+6.50
Liberal	Lucy Wicks	45,933	47.74	−6.50
Labor gain from Liberal		Swing	+6.50	

Alluvial diagram for preference flows in the seat of Robertson in the 2022 federal election. indicates at what stage the winning candidate had over 50% of the votes and was declared the winner.

=== Elections in the 2010s ===
==== 2019 ====
2019 Australian federal election: Robertson
Party	Candidate	Votes	%	±%
Liberal	Lucy Wicks	45,011	46.86	+2.18
Labor	Anne Charlton	32,761	34.10	−4.33
Greens	Cath Connor	7,601	7.91	−0.44
Independent	David Abrahams	2,915	3.03	+3.03
United Australia	Robert Marks	2,702	2.81	+2.81
Animal Justice	Sean Bremner Young	2,000	2.08	+2.08
Sustainable Australia	Judy Singer	1,719	1.79	+1.79
Christian Democrats	Fiona Stucken	1,352	1.41	−1.25
Total formal votes		96,061	92.76	−2.21
Informal votes		7,493	7.24	+2.21
Turnout		103,554	93.17	+0.65
Two-party-preferred result
Liberal	Lucy Wicks	52,100	54.24	+3.10
Labor	Anne Charlton	43,961	45.76	−3.10
Liberal hold		Swing	+3.10	

==== 2016 ====
2016 Australian federal election: Robertson
Party	Candidate	Votes	%	±%
Liberal	Lucy Wicks	42,573	44.68	+1.15
Labor	Anne Charlton	36,611	38.43	+3.74
Greens	Hillary Morris	7,954	8.35	+2.75
Independent	Van Davy	2,726	2.86	+2.86
Christian Democrats	Robert Stoddart	2,539	2.66	+1.40
Antipaedophile	Lawrie Higgins	1,527	1.60	+1.60
Liberal Democrats	Matthew Craig	1,347	1.41	+1.41
Total formal votes		95,277	94.97	+0.90
Informal votes		5,042	5.03	−0.90
Turnout		100,319	92.52	−1.81
Two-party-preferred result
Liberal	Lucy Wicks	48,728	51.14	−1.95
Labor	Anne Charlton	46,549	48.86	+1.95
Liberal hold		Swing	−1.95	

==== 2013 ====
2013 Australian federal election: Robertson
Party	Candidate	Votes	%	±%
Liberal	Lucy Wicks	38,704	43.42	−0.11
Labor	Deborah O'Neill	31,046	34.83	−4.93
Independent	Lawrie McKinna	7,763	8.71	+8.71
Greens	Kate Da Costa	4,966	5.57	−3.42
Independent	Jake Cassar	2,480	2.78	+1.52
Palmer United	Steven Whitaker	2,082	2.34	+2.34
Christian Democrats	Holly Beecham	1,115	1.25	−0.56
Australian Independents	Douglas McFarland	510	0.57	+0.57
Democratic Labour	Paul Sheeran	474	0.53	+0.53
Total formal votes		89,140	94.09	+0.45
Informal votes		5,604	5.91	−0.45
Turnout		94,744	93.97	−0.39
Two-party-preferred result
Liberal	Lucy Wicks	47,242	53.00	+4.00
Labor	Deborah O'Neill	41,898	47.00	−4.00
Liberal gain from Labor		Swing	+4.00	

==== 2010 ====
2010 Australian federal election: Robertson
Party	Candidate	Votes	%	±%
Liberal	Darren Jameson	37,151	43.53	−2.11
Labor	Deborah O'Neill	33,935	39.76	−3.15
Greens	Peter Freewater	7,671	8.99	+1.79
Christian Democrats	Graham Freemantle	1,544	1.81	−0.40
Independent	Melissa Batten	1,513	1.77	+1.77
Independent	Jake Cassar	1,077	1.26	+1.26
Family First	Michael Jakob	749	0.88	+0.07
Liberal Democrats	Nicole Beiger	581	0.68	+0.68
One Nation	Don Parkes	568	0.67	−0.39
Independent	Michelle Meares	552	0.65	+0.65
Total formal votes		85,341	93.64	−2.92
Informal votes		5,795	6.36	+2.92
Turnout		91,136	94.35	−1.76
Two-party-preferred result
Labor	Deborah O'Neill	43,520	51.00	+0.91
Liberal	Darren Jameson	41,821	49.00	−0.91
Labor hold		Swing	+0.91	

=== Elections in the 2000s ===
==== 2007 ====
2007 Australian federal election: Robertson
Party	Candidate	Votes	%	±%
Liberal	Jim Lloyd	39,792	45.63	−7.83
Labor	Belinda Neal	37,437	42.93	+8.29
Greens	Mira Wroblewski	6,279	7.20	−0.65
Christian Democrats	George Grant	1,929	2.21	+2.21
One Nation	Helen Ryan	924	1.06	−0.66
Family First	Daniel Le	708	0.81	−0.91
Citizens Electoral Council	Nicholas Tomlin	141	0.16	−0.11
Total formal votes		87,210	96.56	+1.09
Informal votes		3,109	3.44	−1.09
Turnout		90,319	95.74	+0.11
Two-party-preferred result
Labor	Belinda Neal	43,697	50.11	+6.98
Liberal	Jim Lloyd	43,513	49.89	−6.98
Labor gain from Liberal		Swing	+6.98	

==== 2004 ====
2004 Australian federal election: Robertson
Party	Candidate	Votes	%	±%
Liberal	Jim Lloyd	41,816	53.62	+2.82
Labor	Trish Moran	27,107	34.76	+0.68
Greens	Terry Jones	6,200	7.95	+4.63
One Nation	Don Parkes	1,344	1.72	−1.36
Family First	Carolyn Dorhauer	1,312	1.68	+1.68
Citizens Electoral Council	Nicholas Tomlin	211	0.27	+0.10
Total formal votes		77,990	95.61	+1.72
Informal votes		3,581	4.39	−1.72
Turnout		81,571	95.38	−0.17
Two-party-preferred result
Liberal	Jim Lloyd	44,308	56.81	−0.17
Labor	Trish Moran	33,682	43.19	+0.17
Liberal hold		Swing	−0.17	

==== 2001 ====
2001 Australian federal election: Robertson
Party	Candidate	Votes	%	±%
Liberal	Jim Lloyd	38,448	50.80	+6.90
Labor	Trish Moran	25,789	34.08	−5.77
Democrats	Harry Boyle	2,736	3.62	−0.78
Greens	Stephen Lacey	2,512	3.32	+1.19
One Nation	Errol Baker	2,333	3.08	−6.16
Christian Democrats	Christine Hennig	1,092	1.44	+1.44
Independent	Kevin Wills	744	0.98	+0.98
Independent	Kaijin Kenisciehad	657	0.87	+0.87
Independent	James Laing-Peach	525	0.69	+0.69
Progressive Labour	Barry Phillips	374	0.49	+0.49
Independent	Alasdair Munn	348	0.46	+0.46
Citizens Electoral Council	Ken Martin	125	0.17	+0.17
Total formal votes		75,683	93.89	−3.20
Informal votes		4,928	6.11	+3.20
Turnout		80,611	96.25	
Two-party-preferred result
Liberal	Jim Lloyd	43,121	56.98	+4.97
Labor	Trish Moran	32,562	43.02	−4.97
Liberal hold		Swing	+4.97	

=== Elections in the 1990s ===
==== 1998 ====
1998 Australian federal election: Robertson
Party	Candidate	Votes	%	±%
Liberal	Jim Lloyd	32,963	43.90	−2.89
Labor	Belinda Neal	29,917	39.84	+0.54
One Nation	Kevin Glancy	6,940	9.24	+9.24
Democrats	Andrew Penfold	3,303	4.40	−2.89
Greens	Ian McKenzie	1,598	2.13	+2.13
Unity	Marie Ashburn	364	0.48	+0.48
Total formal votes		75,085	97.09	−0.10
Informal votes		2,254	2.91	+0.10
Turnout		77,339	95.92	−1.16
Two-party-preferred result
Liberal	Jim Lloyd	39,051	52.01	−1.56
Labor	Belinda Neal	36,034	47.99	+1.56
Liberal hold		Swing	−1.56	

==== 1996 ====
1996 Australian federal election: Robertson
Party	Candidate	Votes	%	±%
Liberal	Jim Lloyd	33,825	46.79	+5.49
Labor	Frank Walker	28,412	39.30	−10.85
Democrats	Andrew Penfold	5,271	7.29	+2.45
Against Further Immigration	Roy Whaite	2,472	3.42	+3.42
Greens	Bryan Ellis	1,887	2.61	−0.64
Independent	Valiant Leung	422	0.58	+0.58
Total formal votes		72,289	97.18	−0.58
Informal votes		2,095	2.82	+0.58
Turnout		74,384	97.08	+0.82
Two-party-preferred result
Liberal	Jim Lloyd	38,563	53.56	+9.12
Labor	Frank Walker	33,430	46.44	−9.12
Liberal gain from Labor		Swing	+9.12	

==== 1993 ====
1993 Australian federal election: Robertson
Party	Candidate	Votes	%	±%
Labor	Frank Walker	34,275	50.15	+10.61
Liberal	Mike Gallacher	28,226	41.30	+5.93
Democrats	Glenice Griffiths	3,311	4.84	−10.04
Central Coast Greens	Bryan Ellis	2,218	3.25	+0.57
Natural Law	Beth Eager	310	0.45	+0.45
Total formal votes		68,340	97.77	+0.19
Informal votes		1,560	2.23	−0.19
Turnout		69,900	96.26	
Two-party-preferred result
Labor	Frank Walker	37,960	55.55	+2.56
Liberal	Mike Gallacher	30,369	44.45	−2.56
Labor hold		Swing	+2.56	

==== 1990 ====
1990 Australian federal election: Robertson
Party	Candidate	Votes	%	±%
Labor	Frank Walker	28,466	39.1	−9.9
Liberal	Paul St Clair	25,753	35.4	−6.3
Democrats	Glenice Griffiths	10,995	15.1	+5.7
Independent EFF	John Anderson	3,390	4.7	+4.7
Central Coast Greens	Bryan Ellis	1,968	2.7	+2.7
Grey Power	Joyce Cook	1,254	1.7	+1.7
Independent	Martin Ritter	614	0.8	+0.8
Independent	Paul Baker	289	0.4	+0.4
Total formal votes		72,729	97.6	
Informal votes		1,806	2.4	
Turnout		74,535	96.2	
Two-party-preferred result
Labor	Frank Walker	38,296	52.8	−1.8
Liberal	Paul St Clair	34,253	47.2	+1.8
Labor hold		Swing	−1.8	

=== Elections in the 1980s ===
==== 1987 ====
1987 Australian federal election: Robertson
Party	Candidate	Votes	%	±%
Labor	Barry Cohen	31,983	49.0	−6.3
Liberal	Paul St Clair	27,220	41.7	+4.4
Democrats	Glenice Griffiths	6,132	9.4	+2.0
Total formal votes		65,335	96.4	
Informal votes		2,417	3.6	
Turnout		67,752	95.7	
Two-party-preferred result
Labor	Barry Cohen	35,645	54.6	−4.2
Liberal	Paul St Clair	29,688	45.4	+4.2
Labor hold		Swing	−4.2	

==== 1984 ====
1984 Australian federal election: Robertson
Party	Candidate	Votes	%	±%
Labor	Barry Cohen	32,165	55.3	+1.0
Liberal	Peter Jansen	21,674	37.3	−1.2
Democrats	Trevor Willsher	4,325	7.4	+0.0
Total formal votes		58,164	95.2	
Informal votes		2,920	4.8	
Turnout		61,084	94.9	
Two-party-preferred result
Labor	Barry Cohen	34,073	58.6	+0.0
Liberal	Peter Jansen	24,091	41.4	+0.0
Labor hold		Swing	+0.0	

==== 1983 ====
1983 Australian federal election: Robertson
Party	Candidate	Votes	%	±%
Labor	Barry Cohen	46,058	55.0	+2.6
Liberal	Bev Austin	31,631	37.8	−0.5
Democrats	Trevor Willsher	5,980	7.1	+1.3
Total formal votes		83,669	98.4	
Informal votes		1,355	1.6	
Turnout		85,024	95.1	
Two-party-preferred result
Labor	Barry Cohen		59.3	+1.2
Liberal	Bev Austin		40.7	−1.2
Labor hold		Swing	+1.2	

==== 1980 ====
1980 Australian federal election: Robertson
Party	Candidate	Votes	%	±%
Labor	Barry Cohen	41,569	52.4	+5.7
Liberal	Brian Gill	30,390	38.3	−4.8
Democrats	Trevor Willsher	4,629	5.8	−4.4
Independent	Paul Baker	2,696	3.4	+3.4
Total formal votes		79,284	98.1	
Informal votes		1,501	1.9	
Turnout		80,785	94.9	
Two-party-preferred result
Labor	Barry Cohen		58.1	+5.8
Liberal	Brian Gill		41.9	−5.8
Labor hold		Swing	+5.8	

=== Elections in the 1970s ===
==== 1977 ====
1977 Australian federal election: Robertson
Party	Candidate	Votes	%	±%
Labor	Barry Cohen	32,341	46.7	−1.5
Liberal	Malcolm Brooks	29,825	43.1	−6.2
Democrats	Trevor Willsher	7,095	10.2	+10.2
Total formal votes		69,261	98.5	
Informal votes		1,085	1.5	
Turnout		70,346	96.1	
Two-party-preferred result
Labor	Barry Cohen	36,229	52.3	+3.0
Liberal	Malcolm Brooks	33,032	47.7	−3.0
Labor notional gain from Liberal		Swing	+3.0	

==== 1975 ====
1975 Australian federal election: Robertson
Party	Candidate	Votes	%	±%
Labor	Barry Cohen	41,201	49.9	−7.7
Liberal	Hugh Chalmers	39,331	47.6	+7.9
Independent	Phillip Smith	1,166	1.4	+1.4
Workers	Raymond Louis	868	1.1	+1.1
Total formal votes		82,566	98.4	
Informal votes		1,369	1.6	
Turnout		83,935	96.2	
Two-party-preferred result
Labor	Barry Cohen		51.0	−7.6
Liberal	Hugh Chalmers		49.0	+7.6
Labor hold		Swing	−7.6	

==== 1974 ====
1974 Australian federal election: Robertson
Party	Candidate	Votes	%	±%
Labor	Barry Cohen	42,936	57.6	−0.5
Liberal	Hugh Chalmers	29,637	39.7	+0.6
Australia	Jennifer Baker	2,011	2.7	+2.7
Total formal votes		74,584	98.7	
Informal votes		985	1.3	
Turnout		75,569	96.5	
Two-party-preferred result
Labor	Barry Cohen		58.6	−0.1
Liberal	Hugh Chalmers		41.4	+0.1
Labor hold		Swing	−0.1	

==== 1972 ====
1972 Australian federal election: Robertson
Party	Candidate	Votes	%	±%
Labor	Barry Cohen	36,916	58.1	+7.9
Liberal	Malcolm Brooks	24,823	39.1	−7.4
Democratic Labor	Edmund Dearn	1,804	2.8	+2.8
Total formal votes		63,543	98.9	
Informal votes		697	1.1	
Turnout		64,240	96.1	
Two-party-preferred result
Labor	Barry Cohen		58.7	+6.9
Liberal	Malcolm Brooks		41.3	−6.9
Labor hold		Swing	+6.9	

=== Elections in the 1960s ===
==== 1969 ====
1969 Australian federal election: Robertson
Party	Candidate	Votes	%	±%
Labor	Barry Cohen	25,369	50.2	+11.8
Liberal	William Bridges-Maxwell	23,492	46.5	−6.6
Independent	Albert Date	924	1.8	+1.8
Independent	Wallace Cook	729	1.4	+1.4
Total formal votes		50,514	98.7	
Informal votes		688	1.3	
Turnout		51,202	95.8	
Two-party-preferred result
Labor	Barry Cohen		51.8	+9.7
Liberal	William Bridges-Maxwell		48.2	−9.7
Labor gain from Liberal		Swing	+9.7	

==== 1966 ====
1966 Australian federal election: Robertson
Party	Candidate	Votes	%	±%
Liberal	William Bridges-Maxwell	31,984	53.7	+3.2
Labor	William Smith	22,529	37.8	−6.7
Democratic Labor	Michael Dwyer	2,929	4.9	−0.1
Liberal Reform Group	Percival McPherson	2,112	3.5	+3.5
Total formal votes		59,554	97.3	
Informal votes		1,635	2.7	
Turnout		61,189	94.4	
Two-party-preferred result
Liberal	William Bridges-Maxwell		58.5	+4.4
Labor	William Smith		41.5	−4.4
Liberal hold		Swing	+4.4	

==== 1964 by-election ====
1964 Robertson by-election
Party	Candidate	Votes	%	±%
Liberal	William Bridges-Maxwell	27,220	50.1	−0.4
Labor	Arthur Mollett	25,432	46.8	+2.3
Democratic Labor	Cornelius Woodbury	1,068	2.0	−3.0
Independent Liberal	Victor Taylor	648	1.2	+1.2
Total formal votes		54,368	97.0	
Informal votes		1,701	3.0	
Turnout		56,069	95.0	
Two-party-preferred result
Liberal	William Bridges-Maxwell		52.3	−1.8
Labor	Arthur Mollett		47.7	+1.8
Liberal hold		Swing	−1.8	

==== 1963 ====
1963 Australian federal election: Robertson
Party	Candidate	Votes	%	±%
Liberal	Roger Dean	27,474	50.5	+2.0
Labor	Bob Brown	24,224	44.5	−2.5
Democratic Labor	George Britton	2,717	5.0	+0.5
Total formal votes		54,415	99.0	
Informal votes		574	1.0	
Turnout		54,989	95.5	
Two-party-preferred result
Liberal	Roger Dean		54.1	+2.6
Labor	Bob Brown		45.9	−2.6
Liberal hold		Swing	+2.6	

==== 1961 ====
1961 Australian federal election: Robertson
Party	Candidate	Votes	%	±%
Liberal	Roger Dean	23,760	48.5	−5.4
Labor	Tom Pendlebury	23,065	47.0	+5.0
Democratic Labor	Neil Mackerras	2,211	4.5	+0.4
Total formal votes		49,036	97.8	
Informal votes		1,079	2.2	
Turnout		50,115	95.3	
Two-party-preferred result
Liberal	Roger Dean	25,258	51.5	−5.7
Labor	Tom Pendlebury	23,778	48.5	+5.7
Liberal hold		Swing	−5.7	

=== Elections in the 1950s ===
==== 1958 ====
1958 Australian federal election: Robertson
Party	Candidate	Votes	%	±%
Liberal	Roger Dean	23,201	53.9	−3.8
Labor	Joseph McCaig	18,058	42.0	−0.3
Democratic Labor	Neil Mackerras	1,771	4.1	+4.1
Total formal votes		43,030	97.5	
Informal votes		1,101	2.5	
Turnout		44,131	94.1	
Two-party-preferred result
Liberal	Roger Dean		57.2	−0.5
Labor	Joseph McCaig		42.8	+0.5
Liberal hold		Swing	−0.5	

==== 1955 ====
1955 Australian federal election: Robertson
Party	Candidate	Votes	%	±%
Liberal	Roger Dean	22,660	57.7	+3.9
Labor	Frank Spencer	16,586	42.3	−2.2
Total formal votes		39,246	97.3	
Informal votes		1,075	2.7	
Turnout		40,321	94.5	
Liberal hold		Swing	+3.1	

==== 1954 ====
1954 Australian federal election: Robertson
Party	Candidate	Votes	%	±%
Liberal	Roger Dean	23,910	49.9	−4.1
Labor	Walter Geraghty	22,895	47.8	+1.8
Communist	John Tapp	1,077	2.2	+2.2
Total formal votes		47,882	99.0	
Informal votes		480	1.0	
Turnout		48,362	96.2	
Two-party-preferred result
Liberal	Roger Dean	24,082	50.3	−3.7
Labor	Walter Geraghty	23,800	49.7	+3.7
Liberal hold		Swing	−3.7	

==== 1951 ====
1951 Australian federal election: Robertson
Party	Candidate	Votes	%	±%
Liberal	Roger Dean	22,804	54.0	−0.2
Labor	Walter Geraghty	19,406	46.0	+0.2
Total formal votes		42,210	98.0	
Informal votes		874	2.0	
Turnout		43,084	96.2	
Liberal hold		Swing	−0.2	

=== Elections in the 1940s ===
==== 1949 ====
1949 Australian federal election: Robertson
Party	Candidate	Votes	%	±%
Liberal	Roger Dean	21,617	54.2	+16.2
Labor	Thomas Williams	18,236	45.8	−6.9
Total formal votes		39,853	97.9	
Informal votes		858	2.1	
Turnout		40,711	96.4	
Liberal gain from Labor		Swing	+11.5	

==== 1946 ====
1946 Australian federal election: Robertson
Party	Candidate	Votes	%	±%
Labor	Thomas Williams	32,865	50.5	+0.9
Liberal	Roy Wheeler	24,483	37.6	+0.3
Country	George Watkins	4,624	7.1	+7.1
Lang Labor	Ian Grant	3,113	4.8	+4.8
Total formal votes		65,085	97.1	
Informal votes		1,965	2.9	
Turnout		67,050	93.8	
Two-party-preferred result
Labor	Thomas Williams		53.8	−5.1
Liberal	Roy Wheeler		46.2	+5.1
Labor hold		Swing	−5.1	

==== 1943 ====
1943 Australian federal election: Robertson
Party	Candidate	Votes	%	±%
Labor	Thomas Williams	28,927	49.6	+16.4
United Australia	Eric Spooner	21,746	37.3	−10.6
State Labor	Walter Evans	4,633	7.9	+1.3
One Parliament	Donald Brown	2,550	4.4	+4.4
Independent	Roberta Galagher	480	0.8	+0.8
Total formal votes		58,336	97.1	
Informal votes		1,762	2.9	
Turnout		60,098	95.0	
Two-party-preferred result
Labor	Thomas Williams		58.9	+9.2
United Australia	Eric Spooner		41.1	−9.2
Labor gain from United Australia		Swing	+9.2	

==== 1940 ====
1940 Australian federal election: Robertson
Party	Candidate	Votes	%	±%
Labor	Thomas Williams	17,712	33.2	−11.0
United Australia	Eric Spooner	14,809	27.8	+27.8
United Australia	Sydney Gardner	9,142	17.1	+0.3
Labor (N-C)	Michael McKeon	4,735	8.9	+8.9
State Labor	James Russell	3,503	6.6	+6.6
Independent	William Cox	1,640	3.1	+3.1
United Australia	Campbell Marshall	1,617	3.0	+3.0
Independent	Edward Down	161	0.3	+0.3
Total formal votes		53,319	95.1	
Informal votes		2,763	4.9	
Turnout		56,082	95.2	
Two-party-preferred result
United Australia	Eric Spooner	26,845	50.3	−2.8
Labor	Thomas Williams	26,474	49.7	+2.8
United Australia hold		Swing	−2.8	

=== Elections in the 1930s ===
==== 1937 ====
1937 Australian federal election: Robertson
Party	Candidate	Votes	%	±%
United Australia	Sydney Gardner	24,691	47.6	+5.0
Labor	Gordon Cross	22,923	44.2	+44.2
Independent	John Metcalfe	4,220	8.1	+8.1
Total formal votes		51,834	97.1	
Informal votes		1,553	2.9	
Turnout		53,387	96.2	
Two-party-preferred result
United Australia	Sydney Gardner	27,544	53.1	−3.1
Labor	Gordon Cross	24,290	46.9	+46.9
United Australia hold		Swing	−3.1	

==== 1934 ====
1934 Australian federal election: Robertson
Party	Candidate	Votes	%	±%
United Australia	Sydney Gardner	20,637	42.6	−11.4
Labor (NSW)	Gordon Cross	19,990	41.3	+17.7
Country	William Fleming	5,732	11.8	+11.8
Country	Campbell Marshall	2,093	4.3	+4.3
Total formal votes		48,452	95.9	
Informal votes		2,070	4.1	
Turnout		50,522	95.3	
Two-party-preferred result
United Australia	Sydney Gardner	27,240	56.2	−7.9
Labor (NSW)	Gordon Cross	21,212	43.8	+7.9
United Australia hold		Swing	−7.9	

==== 1931 ====
1931 Australian federal election: Robertson
Party	Candidate	Votes	%	±%
United Australia	Sydney Gardner	21,669	52.6	+1.1
Independent Country	William Fleming	8,246	20.0	+20.0
Labor (NSW)	Peter Robb	7,300	17.7	+17.7
Labor	Wilfred Turnbull	4,014	9.7	−38.8
Total formal votes		41,229	96.7	
Informal votes		1,546	3.6	
Turnout		42,775	96.2	
Two-party-preferred result
United Australia	Sydney Gardner		72.5	+21.0
Labor (NSW)	Peter Robb		27.5	+27.5
United Australia hold		Swing	+21.0	

=== Elections in the 1920s ===
==== 1929 ====
1929 Australian federal election: Robertson
Party	Candidate	Votes	%	±%
Nationalist	Sydney Gardner	19,188	51.5	−48.5
Labor	Michael Fitzgerald	18,077	48.5	+48.5
Total formal votes		37,265	96.2	
Informal votes		1,478	3.8	
Turnout		38,743	92.4	
Nationalist hold		Swing	−48.5	

==== 1928 ====
1928 Australian federal election: Robertson
Party	Candidate	Votes	%	±%
Nationalist	Sydney Gardner	unopposed		
Nationalist hold		Swing		

==== 1925 ====
1925 Australian federal election: Robertson
Party	Candidate	Votes	%	±%
Nationalist	Sydney Gardner	22,777	62.6	+24.6
Labor	Gordon Cross	13,586	37.4	+2.8
Total formal votes		36,363	97.6	
Informal votes		899	2.4	
Turnout		37,262	92.5	
Nationalist hold		Swing	+0.8	

==== 1922 ====
1922 Australian federal election: Robertson
Party	Candidate	Votes	%	±%
Nationalist	Sydney Gardner	7,366	38.0	−17.4
Labor	Alfred Roberts	6,713	34.6	−10.0
Country	William Fleming	5,310	27.4	+27.4
Total formal votes		19,389	95.1	
Informal votes		996	4.9	
Turnout		20,385	52.3	
Two-party-preferred result
Nationalist	Sydney Gardner	11,987	61.8	+6.4
Labor	Alfred Roberts	7,411	38.2	−6.4
Nationalist hold		Swing	+6.4	

=== Elections in the 1910s ===
==== 1919 ====
1919 Australian federal election: Robertson
Party	Candidate	Votes	%	±%
Nationalist	William Fleming	11,468	53.5	−2.7
Labor	James Kelly	9,987	46.5	+2.7
Total formal votes		21,455	98.3	
Informal votes		367	1.7	
Turnout		21,822	65.7	
Nationalist hold		Swing	−2.7	

==== 1917 ====
1917 Australian federal election: Robertson
Party	Candidate	Votes	%	±%
Nationalist	William Fleming	12,827	56.2	+2.8
Labor	Eva Seery	10,008	43.8	−2.8
Total formal votes		22,835	97.2	
Informal votes		655	2.8	
Turnout		23,490	71.6	
Nationalist hold		Swing	+2.8	

==== 1914 ====
1914 Australian federal election: Robertson
Party	Candidate	Votes	%	±%
Liberal	William Fleming	11,822	53.4	−1.9
Labor	John Fraser	10,337	46.6	+1.9
Total formal votes		22,159	97.4	
Informal votes		591	2.6	
Turnout		22,750	69.8	
Liberal hold		Swing	−1.9	

==== 1913 ====
1913 Australian federal election: Robertson
Party	Candidate	Votes	%	±%
Liberal	William Fleming	12,566	55.3	+4.5
Labor	William Johnson	10,143	44.7	−4.5
Total formal votes		22,709	97.2	
Informal votes		653	2.8	
Turnout		23,362	70.4	
Liberal hold		Swing	+4.5	

==== 1910 ====
1910 Australian federal election: Robertson
Party	Candidate	Votes	%	±%
Labour	William Johnson	7,957	50.9	+7.9
Liberal	Henry Willis	7,681	49.1	−7.9
Total formal votes		15,638	98.0	
Informal votes		321	2.0	
Turnout		15,959	57.8	
Labour gain from Liberal		Swing	+7.9	

=== Elections in the 1900s ===
==== 1906 ====
1906 Australian federal election: Robertson
Party	Candidate	Votes	%	±%
Anti-Socialist	Henry Willis	7,199	57.0	−6.5
Labour	William Johnson	5,441	43.0	+43.0
Total formal votes		12,640	96.9	
Informal votes		405	3.1	
Turnout		13,045	49.6	
Anti-Socialist hold		Swing	−6.5	

==== 1903 ====
1903 Australian federal election: Robertson
Party	Candidate	Votes	%	±%
Free Trade	Henry Willis	5,592	63.5	+10.5
Ind. Protectionist	William Wall	3,212	36.5	+36.5
Total formal votes		8,804	97.3	
Informal votes		245	2.7	
Turnout		9,049	40.5	
Free Trade hold		Swing	+10.5	

==== 1901 ====
1901 Australian federal election: Robertson
Party	Candidate	Votes	%	±%
Free Trade	Henry Willis	3,735	53.0	+53.0
Protectionist	Jack FitzGerald	3,307	47.0	+47.0
Total formal votes		7,042	98.1	
Informal votes		134	1.9	
Turnout		7,176	58.0	
Free Trade win		(new seat)		
