= Taylor Martin =

Australian politician

The Honourable Taylor Martin MLC
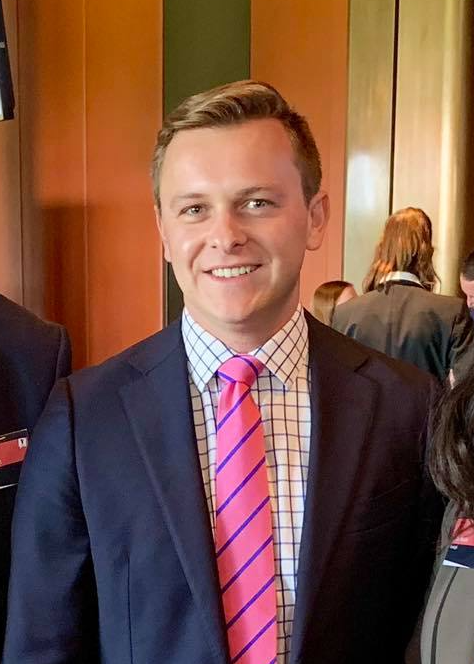

Member of the New South Wales Legislative Council
- Incumbent
- Assumed office 3 May 2017
- Preceded by: Mike Gallacher

Personal details
- Born: 1990 or 1991 (age 35–36)
- Party: Australian Citizens Party (from 2026)
- Other political affiliations: Independent (2024 to 2026); Liberal Party (until 2024)
- Education: University of Newcastle

Taylor Mitchell Martin (born 1990 or 1991) is an Australian politician. He is a member of the New South Wales Legislative Council for the Australian Citizens Party, being first appointed as a Liberal MLC on 3 May 2017, re-elected at the 2019 New South Wales state election, before being expelled from the party in April 2024 over allegations of bullying and abuse. He sat as an independent until November 2026, when he announced his candidacy for the Legislative Council under the banner of the Australian Citizens Party.

== Early life ==
Martin grew up on the New South Wales Central Coast. He was the first member of his family to study at university, studying Finance, Commerce, and Economics at University of Newcastle. During his time there, Martin became the Treasurer of the University Finance Club.

Martin got his start in politics after a chance meeting with then candidate for the federal Division of Robertson, Lucy Wicks, becoming a member of the Liberal Party soon after.

Martin has previous worked at the firm Mercer Financial Services, his family's kitchen fabrication business, and as an advisor to Robertson MP Lucy Wicks.

== Political career ==
Martin was preselected by the Liberal Party in 2017 to fill a casual vacancy caused by the resignation of Mike Gallacher, and subsequently became the youngest member of the New South Wales Legislative Council. Appointed at the age of 26, Martin was the youngest member of the Parliament of New South Wales. Martin was re-elected at the 2019 New South Wales state election, and is currently serving an eight-year term set to expire in 2027.

In Martin's inaugural speech he highlighted small business support, bullying, and domestic violence as his priority policy areas. He also spoke on the emergence of technology and its impact on future regulation and jobs.

Martin has been a member of a number of committees since his election, including the Public Works Committee.

During his time in the Liberal Party, he was a member of the Alex Hawke-led NSW centre-right faction.

In April 2024, Taylor was expelled from the Liberal Party over allegations of bullying and abuse by a former federal Liberal MP and former partner, Lucy Wicks. He then moved to sit on the crossbench as an independent MLC.

In 2017, when campaigning for the nomination to replace retiring Liberal MLC Mike Gallacher, factional opponents of Martin claimed he labelled a colleague a "Nazi". Martin denied the allegation and was successful in winning the nomination.

In 2018, then Liberal Party federal Vice-President Teena McQueen, who was running against Martin in a Liberal Party preselection contest, alleged Martin called her a "spoilt fucking [sic] bitch who has to get her own way" and said "I'll get you, you fucking [sic] wait". Martin denied McQueen’s allegation and subsequently won the preselection contest, before going on to win re-election at the 2019 New South Wales state election.

=== Expulsion from Liberal Party ===
In July 2023, it was revealed that former federal Liberal MP Lucy Wicks, with whom Martin had been in a relationship, had lodged a complaint to the Liberal Party against Martin, which included allegations that she was "physically threatened and received hundreds of demeaning, degrading, and abusive texts" from him. Martin was subsequently stood aside from the party room pending an independent investigation by senior counsel.

In April 2024, Martin was expelled from the Liberal Party after the party received a report by Patricia McDonald SC into the allegations against Martin. The report, which was not publicly released, concluded that Martin’s behaviour, including allegations that Martin called Wicks via text message derogatory terms, including "dumb slut" and a "pig" didn't meet the standards expected of parliamentarians. Martin subsequently moved to the crossbench.

In his valedictory speech in November 2026, Martin announced his candidacy for the Legislative Council as the lead candidate for the Australian Citizens Party at the 2027 New South Wales state election.
