= St Patrick's College, Campbelltown =

St Patrick's College

Location
- Campbelltown, South Western Sydney, New South Wales; Australia; 34°04′37″S 150°49′25″E

Information
- Type: Independent single-sex secondary day school
- Motto: The Lord is My Light
- Religious affiliation: Sisters of the Good Samaritan
- Denomination: Roman Catholicism
- Established: 1840; 186 years ago
- Educational authority: New South Wales Department of Education
- Principal: Mary Leask
- Years: 7–12
- Gender: Girls
- Enrolment: c. 850 (2011)
- Campus type: Suburban
- Colours: Navy blue, red, white
- Nickname: St Pat's, SPC
- Affiliations: Association of Heads of Independent Girls' Schools
- Brother school: St Gregory's College, Campbelltown
- Website: www.saintpatricks.nsw.edu.au

Saint Patrick's College is an Australian independent Roman Catholic single-sex secondary day school for girls located in Campbelltown in south-western Sydney, New South Wales. Established in 1840, it was the first school built by private enterprises in New South Wales and provides a religious and comprehensive education for approximately 850 students from Year 7 to Year 12, in the traditions of the Sisters of the Good Samaritan.

== History ==
St Patrick's College was established in 1840. It was the first school built by private enterprise in the colony of New South Wales and was the result of the initiative of the Catholic people of the Campbelltown area in association with the priest responsible for the district, Fr Gould.

This original school was built on three acres of land donated by Mary Sheil, wife of Dennis Sheil and daughter of local pioneer, William Bradbury and named St Patrick's. The original building still stands today and is now known as ‘Quandong’, which houses the Campbelltown Historic Exhibition, Tourist Information Centre and the St Patrick's museum.

Teachers from the general community staffed the college until 1887 when the Sisters of the Good Samaritan assumed responsibility for the school. In 1888, after the completion of the new St John's church in Cordeaux Street, a convent and school was established at the 'old’ St John's ‘on the hill’ building and took its name from the original St Patrick's at ‘Quandong’.

The final change in location came in 1970 when St Patrick's moved from ‘old’ St John's to its present location. This site was originally a Preparatory School for Boys named St John's or "Westview" and was also conducted by the Sisters of the Good Samaritan, a Catholic order. It is considered a 'congregational school' as it is an independent Catholic, operated by the order. As of 2024 the school reports to have an enrolment of 720 students.

== Student life ==
In a 2023 report by the Sydney Morning Herald the school argued girls had a better academic performance because the school is single sex. While sport remains single sex, some student activities are co-ed. The school's annual activities have included:

- Musical, Combined between Saint Patricks College and St Gregorys College
- PACMAN – Performing Arts Challenge
- Saint Patricks Day Cross Country
- Saint Patrick’s Day
- Saint Benedict’s Day
- Mass
- Year 12 Formal

== Co-curricular ==
Yearly co-curricular activities: aerobics, circuit, pump, spin and body combat fitness classes, indoor rock climbing, yoga, dance, ten-pin bowling, tennis, competitive aerobics, martial arts and gymnastics. The school supports public speaking competitions. It is also a compulsory part of activities that all Year 10 students participate in a self-defence course.

== Social justice ==
Many activities at the school emanate from the social justice teaching of the Vatican, including that of Pope Francis:

- Environmental Council
- St Vincent de Paul
- Ministry Outreach
- Goodooga Immersion

== Sport ==
The students compete with many other schools in the region, largely through the Wollongong Diocesan Sports Council, including:

- Swimming Carnival
- Cross Country
- Macarthur Independent Schools Association Sport MISA
- Athletics Carnival

== House system ==
There are four houses, each named after a significant female figures to Australia:

House	Colour	Name origin
Chisholm	Yellow	Named after Caroline Chisholm, known for her involvement with female immigrant welfare in Australia.
Gilmore	Red	Red House, Named after Dame Mary Gilmore, known for being an Australian socialist poet and journalist.
Kenny	Green	Named after Elizabeth Kenny, known for being a unaccredited nurse who promoted a controversial new approach to the treatment of poliomyelitis.
Lyons	Blue	Named after Dame Enid Lyons, known for being the first women to be elected to the Australian House of Representatives and being the first women appointed to the federal Cabinet.

== Associated schools ==
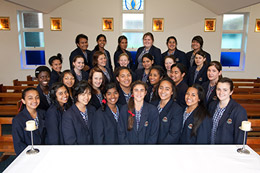
Students in the school choir

- St Gregory's College, Campbelltown
- John Therry Catholic High
- Mount Carmel Catholic College
- Magdalene Catholic High

=== Other Good Samaritan schools ===
The College is a sister school to other Good Samaritan schools in Australia and overseas – St Marys Star of the Sea College (Wollongong NSW), Mater Dei School (Camden, NSW), Mount St. Benedict College (Pennant Hills NSW), Stella Maris College (Manly NSW), Rosebank College (Five Dock NSW), St. Scholasticas College (Glebe NSW), Mater Christi College (Belgrave VIC), Santa Maria College (Northcote VIC), Lourdes Hill College (Hawthorne QLD), Seiwa Junior and Senior High School (Sasebo Japan), and Kinder School (Bacolod, Philippines).

== Notable alumni ==
- Anne McCue – musician
- Deborah O'Neill – Senator
- Margot Vella – dual code rugby footballer

== See also ==
- List of Catholic schools in New South Wales
- Catholic education in Australia
