= 1964 Robertson by-election =

A by-election was held for the Australian House of Representatives seat of Robertson on 5 December 1964. It was triggered by the resignation of Liberal MP Roger Dean.

The by-election was won by Liberal candidate William Bridges-Maxwell.

== Results ==
Robertson by-election, 1964
Party	Candidate	Votes	%	±%
Liberal	William Bridges-Maxwell	27,220	50.1	−0.4
Labor	Arthur Mollett	25,432	46.8	+2.3
Democratic Labor	Cornelius Woodbury	1,068	2.0	−3.0
Independent Liberal	Victor Taylor	648	1.2	+1.2
Total formal votes		54,368	97.0	
Informal votes		1,701	3.0	
Turnout		56,069	95.0	
Two-party-preferred result
Liberal	William Bridges-Maxwell		52.3	−1.8
Labor	Arthur Mollett		47.7	+1.8
Liberal hold		Swing	−1.8	
