= Deborah O'Neill =

Australian politician

Senator Deborah O'Neill
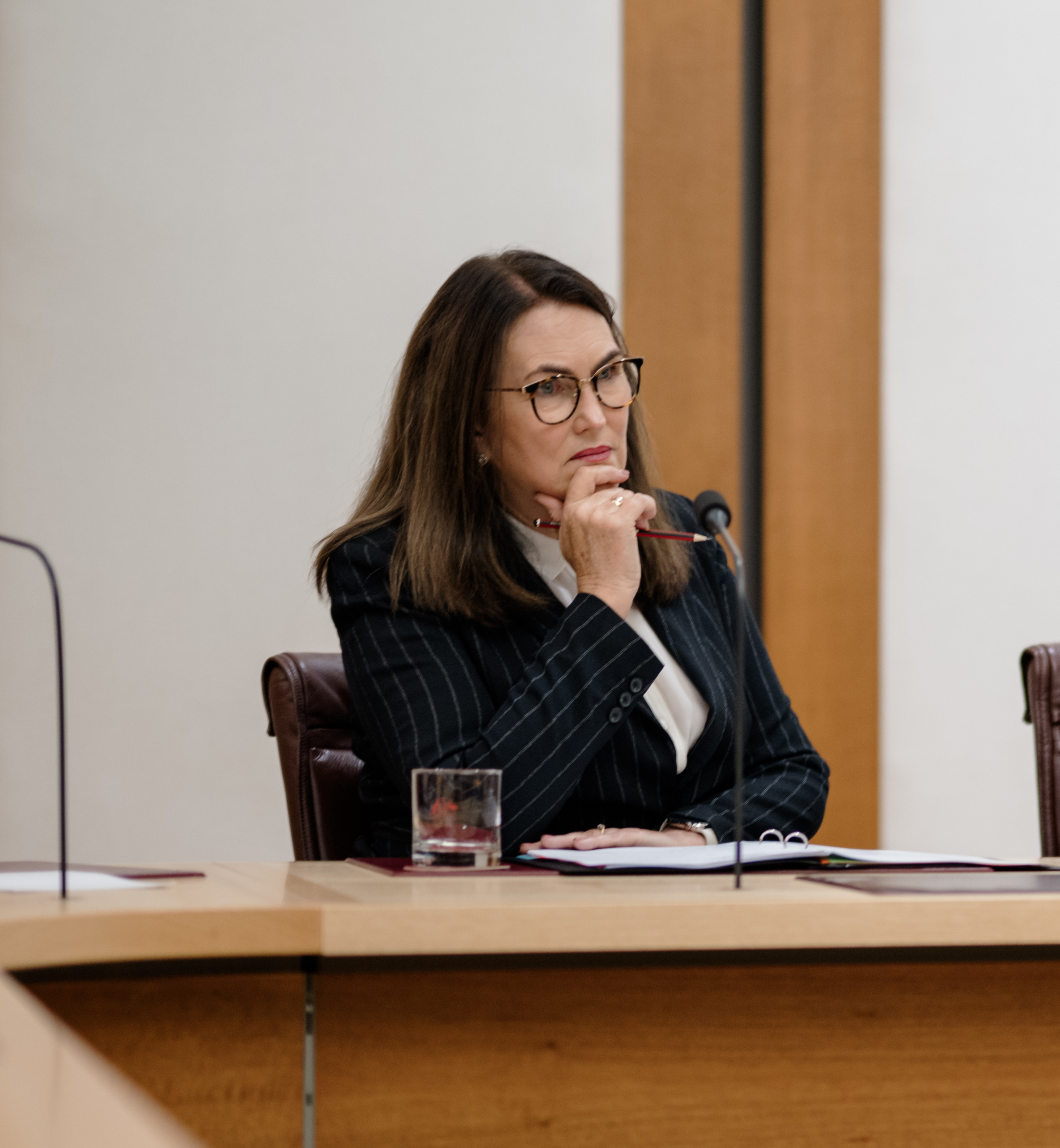
- O'Neill in 2025

Senator for New South Wales
- Incumbent
- Assumed office 13 November 2013
- Preceded by: Bob Carr

Member of the Australian Parliament for Robertson
- In office 21 August 2010 – 7 September 2013
- Preceded by: Belinda Neal
- Succeeded by: Lucy Wicks

Vice President of the New South Wales Labor Party
- In office 9 December 2011 – 2024 Serving with Mark Boyd; Mel Gatfield
- President: Mark Lennon; Michelle Rowland
- Leader: Kristina Keneally; John Robertson; Luke Foley; Michael Daley; Jodi McKay; Chris Minns
- Preceded by: Tara Moriarty
- Succeeded by: Emily Suvaal

Personal details
- Born: Deborah Mary O'Neill; 4 June 1961 (age 65) Parramatta, New South Wales, Australia
- Party: Labor Party
- Spouse: Paul Macinante
- Children: 3
- Education: St Patrick's College
- Alma mater: University of Sydney; University of New England; Australian Catholic University; Deakin University
- Occupation: University lecturer (University of Newcastle)
- Profession: Teacher; Politician
- Website: senatoroneill.com.au

Deborah Mary O'Neill (born 4 June 1961) is an Australian politician who has served as a Senator for New South Wales with the Australian Labor Party since 2013. She previously served a single term in the House of Representatives representing Robertson, New South Wales. In her Senate role, she has been described as taking "a fierce approach to accountability." In June 2023, O'Neill was appointed to chair the newly formed Parliamentary Joint Committee on Corporations and Financial Services. In this role, the committee focused on failures of governance and public accountability amongst the large consulting firms Deloitte, EY, KPMG and PwC. In May 2026, O'Neill was invited to chair the newly constituted Parliamentary Joint Committee on Defence.

== Early life ==
O'Neill was born in Parramatta, New South Wales. She grew up in Western Sydney, one of six children born to Irish Catholic immigrants Mary and Jim O'Neill. Her mother was born in Thomastown and her father in Cork, though they met in Manchester, England. Drawn by a sense of opportunity and the image "of washing drying in the sun in their own backyard", they migrated to Australia.

O'Neill attended Catholic primary schools in Marayong and Girraween and high school at St Patrick's College, Campbelltown. At age 11, she took it upon herself to manage the invoicing for her parents' construction and plant hire business, which they had financed by selling the family home.

O'Neill began an arts degree, but withdrew when her younger sister, Helen, was diagnosed with acute myeloid leukemia. With her death, O'Neill returned to tertiary studies, fulfilling a promise she made to her sister to become a teacher. O'Neill completed a Bachelor of Arts at the University of Sydney and University of New England, a Diploma of Teaching and Master of Arts at Australian Catholic University, and a graduate diploma at Deakin University.

When interviewed in 2023, O'Neill indicated that family and community life gave her a strong sense of social justice, which propelled her first into a teaching a career, then politics. Following university, she worked as a high school teacher and later as an academic in the Faculty of Education and Arts at the University of Newcastle, Central Coast Campus. O'Neill taught at Mercy Catholic College Chatswood, where she would meet her future husband, then at St Edward's College, East Gosford, and Corpus Christi College. After marrying she moved to the Central Coast where the couple have raised their three children. It is reported that, having established her home, and pregnant with their third child, O'Neill heard Paul Keating's 1996 speech on creating a modern Australia; and then decided to join the Labor Party.

== Political career ==
O'Neill would go on to serve in politics, primarily in the federal sphere. Her main areas of activity having been the policy areas of finance and corporations, women's rights, education and defence. She is connected to the conservative right flank of the Labor party, a member the "shoppies" faction, backed by the Shop, Distributive and Allied Employees Association, along with senior Labor figures including Don Farrell and Jacinta Collins.

=== State politics ===
Her political life began in New South Wales state politics, challenging the Liberal Party's Chris Hartcher for the seat of Gosford in the state election of 2003, reducing his margin to 272 votes. She challenged Hartcher again in the 2007 NSW election, this time in the newly created seat of Terrigal, but was defeated.

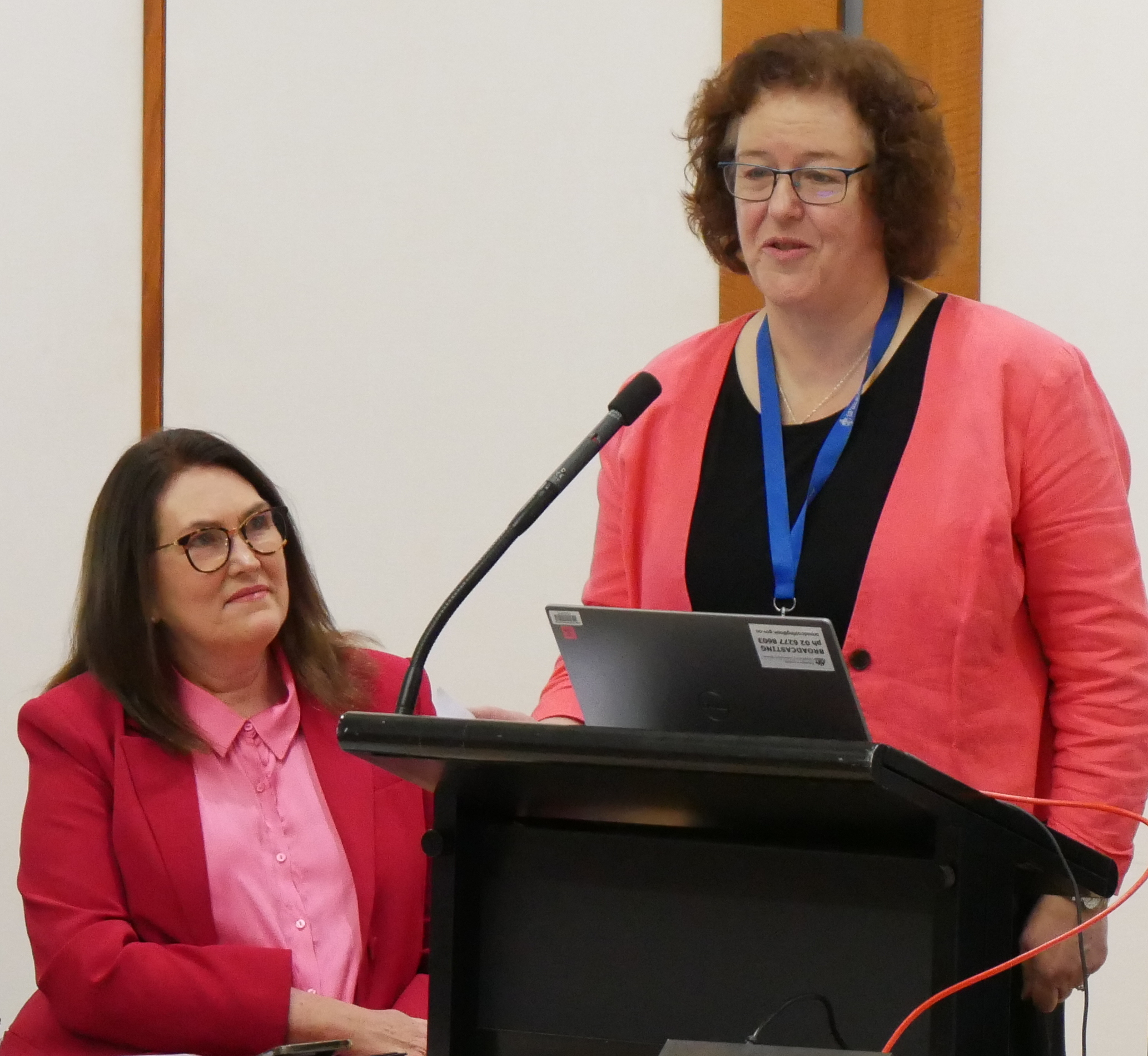
O'Neill listening to Jacinta Collins, at a Parliamentary Friends hearing in November 2023

=== National politics ===
Entering federal politics, O'Neill was chosen as Labor candidate for Robertson gaining preselection over incumbent Labor member, Belinda Neal. She went on to win the seat for Labor at the 2010 Australian federal election, defeating the Liberal candidate Darren Jameson, and increasing Labor's margin by 1 point. She served with Labor under Prime Minister Julia Gillard, joining Committees for Health and Ageing; for Education and Employment; and Chairing the Committee on Corporations and Financial Services, at the behest of then assistant treasurer, Bill Shorten At the 2013 election, O'Neill suffered a 4-point swing against her, being defeated by the Liberals' Lucy Wicks. Her legacy from this time in office was the construction of a cancer clinic for the local region.

=== Senate career ===
==== Becoming a Senator, 44th Parliament ====
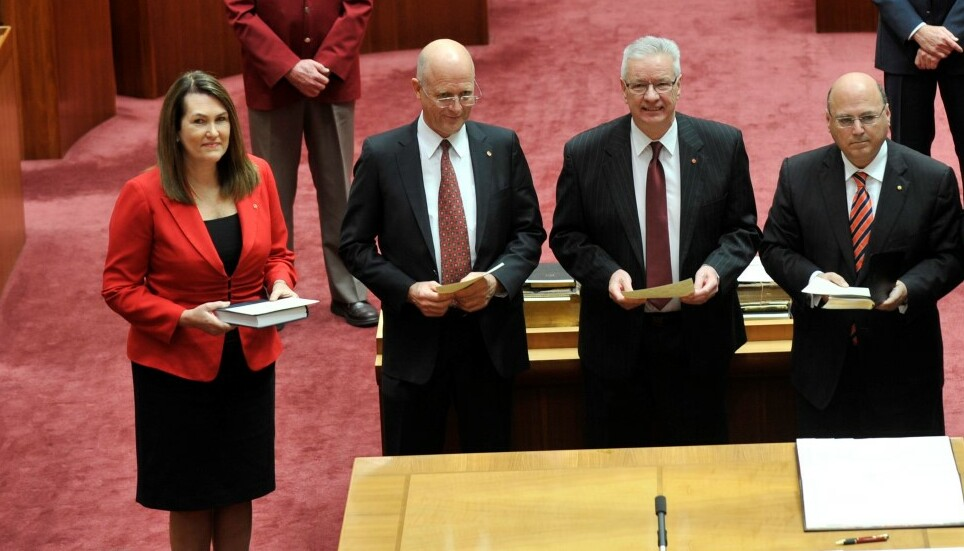
O'Neill being sworn into the Australian Senate in 2014 (along with David Leyonhjelm, Doug Cameron and Arthur Sinodinos)

O'Neill re-entered the Parliament of Australia a few weeks after the 2013 election, only as a Senator for NSW. This followed Bob Carr's resignation from the Senate on 24 October 2013, both of that term and the following six-year term. As vacant Senate positions are filled by the respective state or territory, the matter was resolved by a joint sitting of NSW Parliament, which took four minutes, with the President of the Legislative Council appointing O'Neill to the Senate, in the term which had begun on 1 July. O'Neill joined the Senate on the opposition benches of the 44th Parliament of Australia serving on the Joint Standing Committee on Foreign Affairs, Defence and Trade. Her anticipated six-year term did not eventuate due to the double dissolution of parliament in 2016. While serving as Senator for NSW, O'Neill has also been made Labor's duty Senator for the divisions of Farrer, Lyne, Hume, Parkes, Calare and Riverina.

==== Senator and Shadow Minister, 45th Parliament ====
Regardless, O'Neill was elected to the Senate in her own right in the 2016 Australian federal election. In the first sitting of the new Senate she was chosen to be one of the six-year senators in accordance with Section 13 of the Constitution. Serving under Opposition Leader Bill Shorten, she was appointed as Shadow Assistant Minister for Mental Health and Shadow Assistant Minister for Innovation. O'Neill chose to abstain from the Senate Vote on the Same Sex Marriage Bill in 2017. Her strong opposition to Matthias Corman's proposal to reduce corporate tax in 2018 led to her being listed amongst "Women Who Are Absolutely Done Listening To Men."

==== Senator, 46th Parliament ====
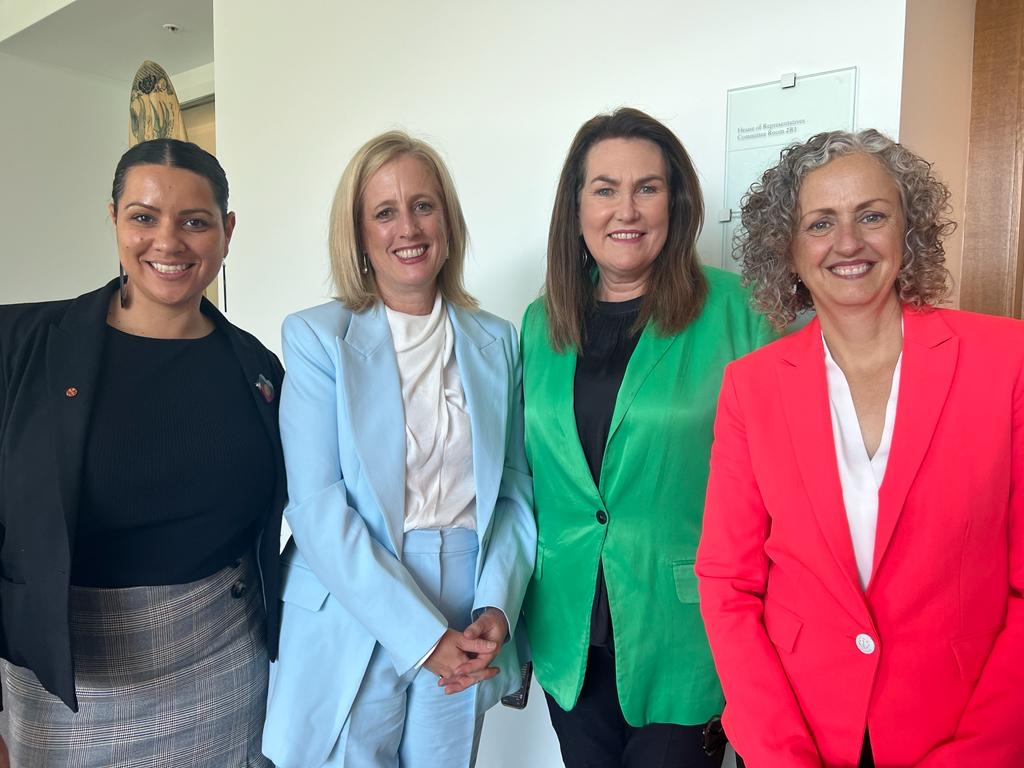
O'Neill (in green) with fellow Labor Senators Jana Stewart and Katy Gallagher on her right, and Jess Walsh on her left, mid 2022

O'Neill continued to serve from opposition benches, but now under the leadership of Labor leader Anthony Albanese. In July 2019, she was appointed to the Joint Standing Committee on Foreign Affairs, Defence and Trade; and the Joint Statutory Committee on Corporations and Financial Services. Using this position she pressured Australian Securities & Investments Commission to investigate AMP Limited for unfair contracts with financial planners. She also accused AMP Limited, EY and KPMG of allowing sexual harassment and bullying in their organisations, and challenged a member of the Fair Work Commission for displaying sexualised waifus in a government office. In her committee work on Community Affairs, O'Neill confronted the cosmetic surgery industry for "butchering" many patients, then for gaslighting those patients; she also challenged government for its failure to regulate the industry. Likewise, O'Neill pursued the Department of Social Services' Robodebt scheme, for information about suicides amongst people who had been handed unlawful debts, and clashing with the department's secretary Kathryn Campbell. The scheme was scrapped in May 2020 with the government refunding $721m to Australian people. During this Parliament, O'Neill held senior party positions, including Deputy Co-chair of the ALP's National Policy Forum.

==== Senator on Government benches, 47th Parliament ====
In the run up to the 2022 Australian federal election, O'Neill refused to relinquish the top position for the Labor Senate ticket to Kristina Keneally, leading to a bitter internal contest, in which she prevailed. O'Neill campaigned in regional and metropolitan NSW and was returned to the Senate, for a six year term, for a second time. Prime Minister Anthony Albanese appointed her to the committees for Treaties, for Corporations and Financial Services and for Foreign Affairs, Defence and Trade – which she chairs. O'Neill has asserted Labor's commitment to introducing new laws, in 47th Parliament of Australia, allowing faith-based schools to select staff of that faith. She stood against legislation enabling Assisted suicide in Australia's territories.

===== PWC tax scandal =====
Beginning in August 2022, O'Neill has served as the chair of The Joint Standing Committee on Corporations and Financial Services. In this role she focused the committee on "uncovering the full extent of failure points" amongst the Big Four accounting firms, particularly their "lack of accountability" to "ensure the national interest prevails.” Having uncovered the 144-page cache of internal PwC emails, O'Neill played a leading part in exposing the PwC tax scandal, revealing that 30 partners and staff were involved. She demanded a clean-out of all who had participated in the breach of confidential Australian Tax Office information, whether “actively or passively.”

In June 2023 O'Neill announced a new joint parliamentary inquiry into these companies, their lack of disclosure obligations; the committee will explore how these companies are regulated and disciplined "for bad behaviour." The Canberra Times described her approach as "not being so different to installing order in a high school classroom." She has been open in stating her goal is to force large consultancies, like PwC, to be fully transparent in their dealings with government.

==== Senator and Defence Committee Chair, 48th Parliament ====
Returning to Parliament in 2025, O'Neill has provided oversight in defence, beginning as the Chair of the Defence Subcommittee of the Joint Standing Committee on Foreign Affairs and Trade. On 4 March 2026 the Minister for Defence, Richard Marles, announced legislation had passed to establish the Parliamentary Joint Committee on Defence which would consider matters relating to the Australian Defence Force, Department of Defence, Department of Veteran's Affairs and the Australian Submarine Agency. O'Neill, reported by the Australian Financial Review to be an "AUKUS champion", was reported to be the Chair of the new committee. The committee operates under strict classified information protocols and will oversee the Australia's most sensitive defence programs, including the AUKUS nuclear powered submarine enterprise.

== Political views ==
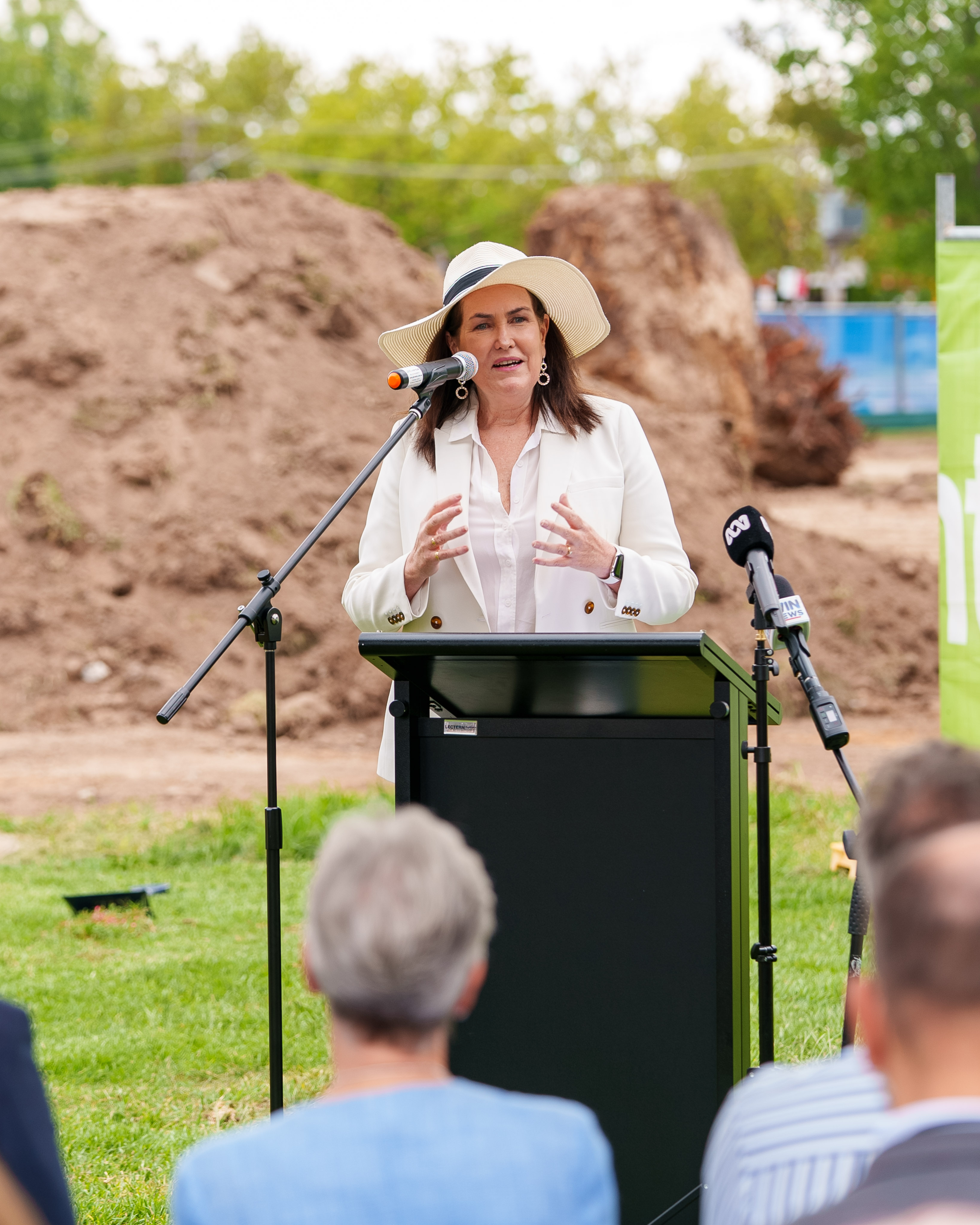
At the building site for the new Orange Regional Conservatorium

O'Neill is reported to carry two items in her handbag: a set of pink rosary beads and a copy of the Universal Declaration of Human Rights. Known as a devout Catholic Christian, she has described politics as her way of giving action to faith. O'Neill is known to be part of the socially conservative Right faction of the Labor Party. She has been quoted as saying, “My faith and my belief about people is absolutely embedded in my politics." Political reporter Miriam Webber has described O'Neill's faith as a driving force to "get to the truth" in parliamentary hearings.

Along with Senator James Paterson and Peter Khalil, O'Neill is a member of the Inter-Parliamentary Alliance on China, she is the Oceania representative for the International Parliamentary Network for Education (IPNEd), and a delegate to the International Parliamentary Union (IPU).

Her notable positions have been:

- Supportive of a strong public sector, and with that a critic of neoliberal desire for private sector delivery of government services.
- Hawkish on China, criticising China's leadership on matters of human rights and religious freedom.
- Supportive of workers rights, advocating for the benefits of entitlements that come with fulltime positions for staff.
- Conservative on marriage, saying "I believe in the traditional definition of marriage."
- Strong advocate for Science, technology, engineering, and mathematics.
- Concerned at the growing divide between religious and non-religious Australians. She called for a greater focus on religious studies in schools in order to further cultural literacy.
- Opposition to euthanasia.

== Personal life ==
O'Neill has three children with her husband Paul and lives in Erina on NSW's Central Coast.

Parliament of Australia
Preceded by Belinda Neal	Member for Robertson; 2010–2013	Succeeded by Lucy Wicks
Preceded by Bob Carr	Senator for New South Wales; 2013–present	Incumbent
