= Barry Cohen (politician) =

Australian politician (1935-2017)

The Honourable Barry Cohen AM
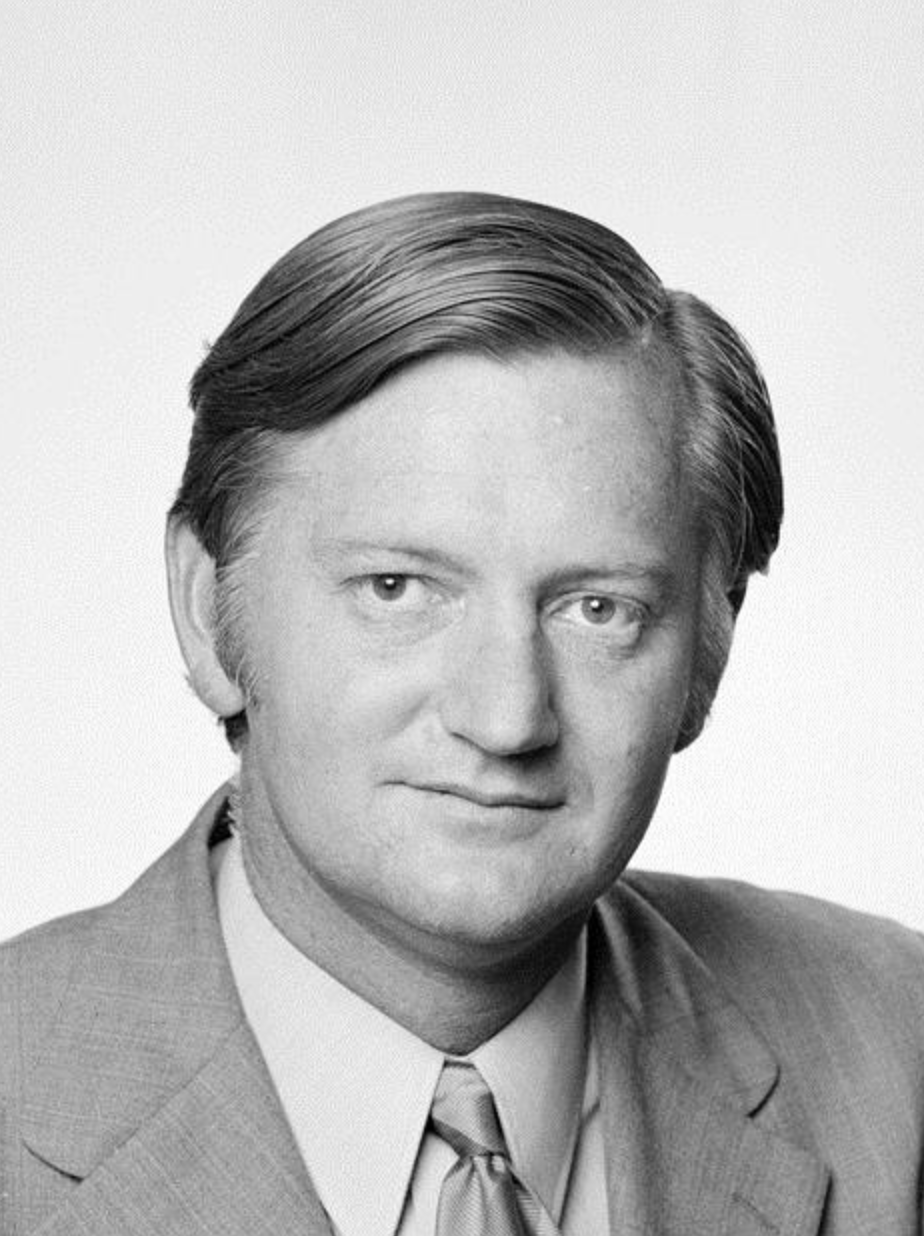

Minister for Arts, Heritage and the Environment
- In office 13 December 1984 – 24 July 1987
- Prime Minister: Bob Hawke
- Preceded by: New title
- Succeeded by: John Brown (Arts, Sport, the Environment, Tourism and Territories)

Minister for Home Affairs and the Environment
- In office 11 March 1983 – 13 December 1984
- Prime Minister: Bob Hawke
- Preceded by: Tom McVeigh
- Succeeded by: Title abolished

Member of the Australian Parliament for Robertson
- In office 25 October 1969 – 19 February 1990
- Preceded by: William Bridges-Maxwell
- Succeeded by: Frank Walker

Personal details
- Born: 3 April 1935 Griffith, New South Wales, Australia
- Died: 18 December 2017 (aged 82)
- Party: Australian Labor Party
- Spouse: Rae O'Neill
- Occupation: Businessman

Barry Cohen AM (3 April 1935 – 18 December 2017) was an Australian politician. He was a member of the Australian Labor Party (ALP) and served in federal parliament from 1969 to 1990, representing the Division of Robertson in New South Wales. He held ministerial office in the Hawke government from 1983 to 1987.

== Early life ==
Cohen was born on 3 April 1935 in Griffith, New South Wales. His parents had settled in Griffith during the Great Depression, where his South African-born father worked as a dentist. His paternal grandparents were Polish Jews from the villages of Pajęczno and Działoszyn, who immigrated to Australia via England and South Africa; other members of the family who remained in Poland were killed in the Holocaust.

Cohen spent his early years in Griffith, where he later recalled his family was one of only three Jewish families in the town. At the age of 10 he was sent to Sydney to board at Sydney Grammar School, where he was subjected to antisemitic bullying. He was a golf and squash champion as a schoolboy, and after leaving school worked for periods as a sporting goods salesman and squash coach. He was a member of the Citizen Military Forces from 1953 to 1957 and undertook national service training with the 12th Battalion.

Cohen eventually settled in Turramurra and established a menswear store in St Ives. He was president of the St Ives Merchants' Association and in 1965 led a protest calling on the state government to extend shopping hours. He remained involved with sport as a golf, squash and tennis commentator, including on broadcasts of the Davis Cup.

== Parliament ==
=== Early years ===
Cohen joined the Australian Labor Party in 1964. He became more active in politics via his interest in Aboriginal affairs, serving on the executive of the Federal Council for the Advancement of Aborigines and Torres Strait Islanders in the late 1960s. In March 1969 he won ALP preselection for the seat of Robertson. He was elected to the House of Representatives at the 1969 federal election, winning Robertson from the incumbent Liberal MP William Bridges-Maxwell.

In his first years in parliament Cohen emerged as a prominent advocate of road safety. In 1971 he published a 110-page booklet on road safety titled The Australian Way of Death. He was appointed chair of the House of Representatives Select Committee on Road Safety in 1973, remaining chair until 1976 following its conversion to a standing committee in 1974.

Cohen also spoke frequently in parliament on foreign affairs matters. In 1970 he criticised the Gorton government for adopting a "neutral" stance in the Israeli–Palestinian conflict and accused the Arab lobby in Australia of using Nazi propaganda tactics. Cohen publicly opposed the South African government's apartheid policy and was a leader of protests against the 1971 South Africa rugby union tour of Australia.

=== Frontbencher ===
Cohen was elected to Bill Hayden's shadow ministry in 1977 and named opposition spokesman for the environment, sport and recreation, tourism and home affairs. As a frontbencher he lobbied for the Australian government to assist the Soviet Jewry movement and "facilitated ties between the government and the community in its campaign to raise awareness of the plight of Soviet Jewry".

On 11 March 1983, following the ALP's victory at the 1983 federal election, Cohen was appointed Minister for Home Affairs and the Environment in the Hawke government. His portfolio was changed to Minister for Arts, Heritage and Environment on 13 December 1984, following the 1984 election. He was also appointed Minister Assisting the Prime Minister for the Bicentennial.

After the 1987 election, Cohen failed to win re-election to the ministry and his tenure as a minister ceased on 24 July 1987. He was defeated in the caucus ballot by ALP powerbroker Graham Richardson and subsequently "launched a bitter attack" on Richardson and the ALP's factional system.

Cohen retired from parliament at the 1990 election. At the 1999 New South Wales state election he was a candidate for Gosford, losing to the incumbent Liberal member, Chris Hartcher.

== Later life ==
After leaving parliament, Cohen remained active as a political commentator, writing columns for The Australian and The Bulletin. In 2004 he attracted attention through an opinion piece in the Australian Jewish News in which declared that antisemitism was "rampant" in the ALP.

In 2015, Cohen and three other former MPs brought a case before the High Court of Australia, purporting that reductions to their retirement allowances and limitations on the number of "domestic return trips per year" under the Members of Parliament (Life Gold Pass) Act 2002 were unconstitutional under S51(xxxi) of the Constitution of Australia. They lost the case in 2016, with the court finding that Parliament was entitled to vary the terms of allowances.

=== Publications ===
In retirement Cohen wrote a number of books on political anecdotes, and an autobiography:

- Life with Gough (1996)
- From Whitlam to Winston (1997)
- The Almost Complete Gough (2001)
- The Life of the Party – Political Anecdotes (1987)
- How to Become Prime Minister (1990)

== Personal ==
Cohen married Rae McNeill in October 1959 and they had three sons.

Although Cohen voted for the decriminalisation of homosexuality in the 1970s, he spoke out against gay marriage, arguing that "gay marriage and conventional marriage is [not] the same thing".

In 2014, Cohen publicly announced he had been diagnosed with early-stage dementia in an interview with 7.30, in which he called for the government to sponsor further research into the condition. He died of Alzheimer's disease on 18 December 2017, aged 82.

== Honours ==
Cohen was appointed a Member of the Order of Australia in the Queen's Birthday Honours in 2007, for service to the Australian Parliament and to the community through a range of cultural and environmental roles and contributions to public discussion and debate.

A species of fossil marsupial, Yalkaparidon coheni, was named after him.

Political offices
Preceded by Tom McVeigh (home affairs and the environment); Neil Brown (consumer affairs)	Minister for Home Affairs and the Environment; 1983–1984	Succeeded by John Brown
Preceded by Tom McVeigh (home affairs and the environment); Neil Brown (consumer affairs)	Minister for Arts, Heritage and the Environment; 1984–1987	Succeeded by John Brown
Parliament of Australia
Preceded by William Bridges-Maxwell	Member for Robertson; 1969–1990	Succeeded by Frank Walker
