= Lucy Wicks (politician) =

Australian politician

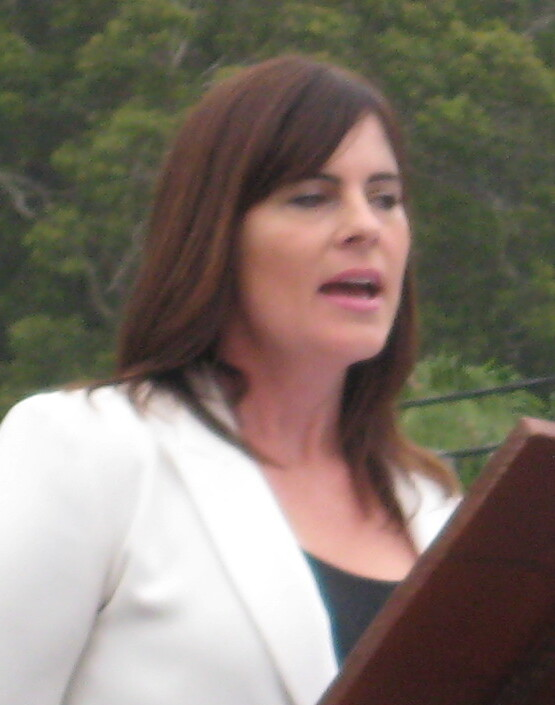

Member of the Australian Parliament for Robertson
- In office 7 September 2013 – 21 May 2022
- Preceded by: Deborah O'Neill
- Succeeded by: Gordon Reid

Personal details
- Born: Lucy Elizabeth Warren; 1 January 1973 (age 53) Canberra, Australian Capital Territory, Australia
- Party: Liberal Party of Australia
- Children: 2
- Education: University of Sydney
- Occupation: Teacher public relations manager

Lucy Elizabeth Wicks (née Warren; born 1 January 1973) is an Australian former politician. She was a Liberal member of the House of Representatives from 2013 to 2022, representing the Division of Robertson in New South Wales. She lost her seat to the Australian Labor Party candidate Gordon Reid at the 2022 federal election. She was the Liberal candidate for Robertson in the 2025 federal election but was unsuccessful.

== Early life ==
Wicks was born in Canberra on 1 January 1973. She is the oldest of five children born to Mary (née Gilligan) and Max Warren. On her mother's side she is a descendant of Francis Gilligan, an Irishman who was transported to Australia as a convict under the Whiteboy Acts.

Wicks grew up in Canberra and country New South Wales where her father worked as a schoolteacher. She lived for periods in Cowra and Walcha, before the family settled in Point Clare on the Central Coast. She attended the Gosford Christian Community School in Narara where her father was the principal. Wicks holds the degree of Bachelor of Arts (Hons.) in English literature from the University of Sydney. After graduating she returned to Gosford Christian Community School as a teacher from 1996 to 1998.

From 1999 to 2003, Wicks worked as a Liberal Party staffer and electorate officer. She later worked in corporate affairs and communications for Telstra from 2004 to 2011, and as a government relations adviser from 2011 to 2012. In her twenties, she "suffered with massive depression from PTSD arising from a very significant workplace bullying incident that took me years to recover from".

== Politics ==
Wicks was a state vice-president of the Young Liberals from 2001 to 2002. She later served as president of the state women's council and state vice-president in the Liberal Party of Australia (New South Wales Division) from 2011 to 2012.

Wicks is a member of the centre-right faction of the Liberal Party.

=== Parliament ===
Wicks was appointed the Liberal candidate for the federal seat of Robertson in 2012. The state executive chose not to hold a preselection for the seat in order to "overcome entrenched local factions", with Wicks reportedly endorsed by opposition leader Tony Abbott. As a result some local members refused to campaign for her. Wicks was nonetheless elected to the House of Representatives at the 2013 federal election, defeating the incumbent Australian Labor Party (ALP) member Deborah O'Neill.

Wicks was appointed to the speaker's panel in February 2015. She was narrowly re-elected at the 2016 election. She has served on various parliamentary committees and in July 2019 she was appointed chair of the Joint Committee of Public Accounts and Audit.

In 2020, it was reported that Wicks had attended the Hope Unlimited Church, a Pentecostal congregation, on a number of occasions, and that the church had recently been awarded a government grant. She subsequently stated that she was not a member of the church, had not been involved in the awarding of the grant, and that she attends multiple churches within her electorate, "usually at the request of a church for their special events".

Wicks was defeated at the 2022 Australian federal election by Labor MP Gordon Reid, with a 7.7% swing on a two party preferred basis.

Wicks was once again defeated at the 2025 Australian federal election by Labor MP Gordon Reid.

== Personal life ==
Wicks has two children with her former husband Chris. The family lived in Springfield until 2017, when they sold their home and began renting in Terrigal. Wicks also owns an investment property in North Avoca.

In 2017, Wicks announced she had been diagnosed by an integrative medicine practitioner with chronic inflammatory response syndrome (CIRS), or sick building syndrome, following symptoms that included chest infections, chronic fatigue and memory lapses. She was advised to "avoid buildings with mould and other biotoxins" and had to cut back on her parliamentary duties depending on the location. She lobbied for a parliamentary inquiry into CIRS similar to the one into Lyme disease in 2017 and was a committee member for the Inquiry into Biotoxin-related Illnesses in Australia in 2018.

In July 2023, Wicks made a formal complaint to the Liberal Party about state Liberal MLC Taylor Martin, with whom Wicks had previously been in a relationship. Wicks alleged that she was "physically threatened and received hundreds of demeaning, degrading, and abusive texts" from Martin. Wicks was reported to be distressed after the confidential complaint was leaked to the media and she was identified as the complainant by radio station 2GB. In April 2024, Martin was expelled from the NSW Liberal Party after the party received a report by Patricia McDonald SC into Wicks’ allegations against him.

Parliament of Australia
Preceded by Deborah O'Neill	Member for Robertson; 2013–2022	Succeeded by Gordon Reid
