= Sydney Gardner =

Australian politician (1884–1965)

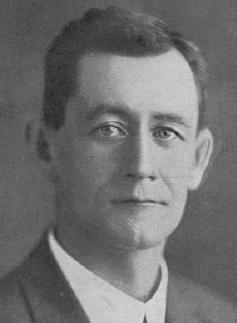

Member of the Australian Parliament for Robertson
- In office 16 December 1922 – 21 September 1940
- Preceded by: William Fleming
- Succeeded by: Eric Spooner

Personal details
- Born: 9 June 1884 Aberdeen, New South Wales
- Died: 23 June 1965 (aged 81)
- Party: Nationalist (1922–31); UAP (1931–40)
- Occupation: Farmer

Sydney Lane Gardner (9 June 1884 – 23 June 1965) was an Australian politician. He was a member of the Australian House of Representatives from 1922 to 1940, representing the seat of Robertson for the Nationalist Party of Australia (1922–1931) and United Australia Party (1931–1940).

Gardner was born at Rouchel, near Aberdeen in the Hunter Valley, and was educated at Scone Grammar School and the University of Sydney. He worked as a teacher at Melville, Davis Creek, Ferndale and Stoney Creek schools between 1903 and 1908, when he resigned from the Education Department and returned to farming at his family's property, "Rose Vale". He unsuccessfully sought Liberal Reform Party preselection for a 1910 state by-election, but instead was appointed as organising secretary of the party's Upper Hunter Electorate Council. Gardner was made a justice of the peace in 1913. He unsuccessfully contested Nationalist Party of Australia preselection for the 1919 federal election, again taking on an organiser role. He worked for the federal Department of Taxation for a period before passing his accountants' examination in 1921 and becoming an accountant at Singleton. In public life, he was a member of both the Pastures Protection Board and the Public School Board.

In 1922, he was elected to the Australian House of Representatives as the Nationalist member for Robertson, defeating William Fleming, deputy leader of the Country Party. He increased his majority to 9,000 votes in his re-election in 1925. In 1931, the Nationalist Party became the United Australia Party (UAP), which Gardner joined. In parliament, he was a member of the Joint Committee on Public Accounts and was Government Whip and secretary to the United Australia Party caucus. He held Robertson until 1940, when he was defeated by rival UAP candidate and state UAP minister Eric Spooner after the party decided to endorse two candidates. He returned to farming at Rose Vale after leaving politics. Gardner died in 1965.

Parliament of Australia
Preceded by William Fleming	Member for Robertson; 1922–1940	Succeeded by Eric Spooner
