= William Bridges-Maxwell =

Australian politician (1929–1992)

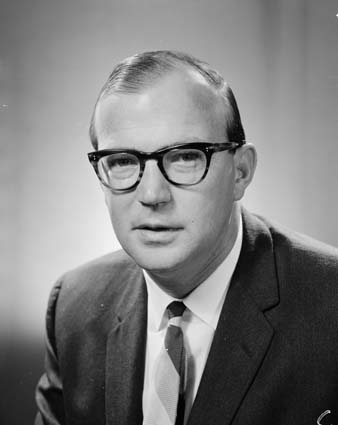

Member of the Australian Parliament for Robertson
- In office 5 December 1964 – 25 October 1969
- Preceded by: Roger Dean
- Succeeded by: Barry Cohen

Personal details
- Born: 27 September 1929 Hobart, Tasmania
- Died: 15 April 1992 (aged 62)
- Party: Liberal
- Spouse: Gillian
- Children: Joanna and Michael
- Education: Royal Agricultural College
- Occupation: Veterinary scientist

Crawford William Bridges-Maxwell (27 September 1929 – 15 April 1992) was an Australian politician. He was a member of the House of Representatives from 1964 to 1969, representing the seat of Robertson for the Liberal Party. He was a veterinary scientist by profession.

== Early life ==
Bridges-Maxwell was born on 27 September 1929 in Hobart, Tasmania.

Bridges-Maxwell was educated at Geelong Grammar School and then the Royal Agricultural College in England, after which he became a veterinary scientist. At the time of his election to parliament, he was working as secretary of the University of Sydney's Dairy Research Foundation and Poultry Research Foundation.

== Politics ==
Bridges-Maxwell was elected to the state executive of the Liberal Party in the late 1950s and was active on its rural policy committee. He was elected to the House of Representatives at the 1964 Robertson by-election, retaining the seat of Robertson for the Liberal Party following the resignation of Roger Dean. After his election, which coincided with the 1964 half-Senate election, an unsuccessful petition was lodged with the Court of Disputed Returns to overturn the result – along with the election of six other MPs and senators – on the grounds of alleged illegal campaign expenditure.

Bridges-Maxwell's maiden speech in parliament concentrated on education and scientific research. He called on the federal government to establish a standalone Department of Education and Science (eventually created in 1966) and establish a nonpartisan advisory committee to review government research expenditure. Bridges-Maxwell was a supporter of Prime Minister John Gorton and was a member of the Mushroom Club, an informal dinner club comprising members of Gorton's inner circle.

Prior to the 1969 federal election, Bridges-Maxwell's seat of Robertson was significantly altered in an electoral redistribution. He unsuccessfully sought Liberal preselection for the newly created seat of Berowra, but was defeated by fellow incumbent MP Tom Hughes whose own seat of Parkes had been abolished. At the election, Bridges-Maxwell was defeated by the Australian Labor Party candidate Barry Cohen as part of a nationwide swing against the Liberals. He was also disadvantaged by the Democratic Labor Party's decision not to field a candidate in Robertson, based on his reputation as a "Gorton man".

== Later activities ==
Bridges-Maxwell served as a co-opted member of the CSIRO council from 1968 to 1973.

Bridges-Maxwell died on 15 April 1992, aged 62.

Parliament of Australia
Preceded by Roger Dean	Member for Robertson; 1964–1969	Succeeded by Barry Cohen
