= Gordon Reid (politician) =

Australian politician (born 1992)

Gordon Reid MP

Member of the Australian Parliament for Robertson
- Incumbent
- Assumed office 21 May 2022
- Preceded by: Lucy Wicks

Personal details
- Born: 16 August 1992 (age 34)
- Party: Australian Labor Party
- Education: University of Newcastle
- Occupation: Emergency Department doctor

Gordon James Reid (born 16 August 1992) is an Australian medical practitioner and politician. He has been the Labor MP for Robertson, New South Wales since the 2022 Australian federal election.

== Early life and education ==
Reid is a Wiradjuri man who was on born 16 August 1992 on Darkinjung country and grew up on the Central Coast.

He attended Umina Beach Public School and Central Coast Grammar School, before studying medicine at the University of Newcastle, completing his B.Med. in 2016.

== Career ==
Reid previously worked as an emergency doctor. He said that he decided to run for Parliament while working in the Emergency Department at Wyong Hospital during the COVID-19 pandemic in Australia, seeing people waiting for treatment.

In the 2022 Australian federal election, Reid defeated Liberal incumbent Lucy Wicks in Robertson. He became one of six First Nations people in the Labor Caucus.

In 2023, Andrew Bolt — a columnist whose views in a different case were controversially found to breach the Racial Discrimination Act 1975 — alleged that Reid had lied about his indigenous heritage.

== Other activities ==
He is co-chair of Parliamentary friends of the Uluru Statement, a non-partisan group launched on 13 February 2023 to support the "Yes" campaign for the 2023 Australian Indigenous Voice referendum, along with the Liberal Party's Bridget Archer and Independent Allegra Spender.

== Personal life ==
Reid speaks Indonesian and plays the saxophone.

Parliament of Australia
Preceded by Lucy Wicks	Member for Robertson; 2022–present	Incumbent
