= Thomas Williams (Australian politician) =

Australian politician

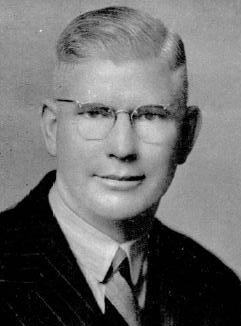

Member of the Australian Parliament for Robertson
- In office 21 August 1943 – 10 December 1949
- Preceded by: Eric Spooner
- Succeeded by: Roger Dean

Personal details
- Born: 7 April 1897 Young, New South Wales
- Died: 1992 (aged 94–95)
- Party: Australian Labor Party
- Occupation: Barrister

Thomas Francis Williams (7 April 1897 – 1992) was an Australian politician.

Born in Young, New South Wales, Williams was educated at Catholic schools and then the University of Sydney, becoming a barrister in 1923.

In 1943 Williams gained Australian Labor Party (ALP) pre-selection for the Australian House of Representatives electorate of Robertson and defeated sitting United Australia Party (UAP) member Eric Spooner at the 1943 federal election.

Following the death in office of Prime Minister John Curtin on 5 July 1945, Williams urged that the caucus leadership ballot should be deferred until the return of H.V. Evatt from overseas, whom Williams described as "the biggest man in political life in Australia". Instead, the caucus elected Ben Chifley as leader of the ALP parliamentary leader (and thus Prime Minister).

Williams held the seat of Robertson until the 1949 federal election, when he was defeated by Liberal Party of Australia candidate Roger Dean. Williams returned to law and died in 1992.

== Sources ==
- Abjorensen, N. (2016) The Manner of Their Going, Australian Scholarly Publishing: Kew. ISBN 978 1 925333 21 3.

Parliament of Australia
Preceded by Eric Spooner	Member for Robertson; 1943 – 1949	Succeeded by Roger Dean
