= Roger Dean (politician) =

Australian politician

Roger Dean CBE
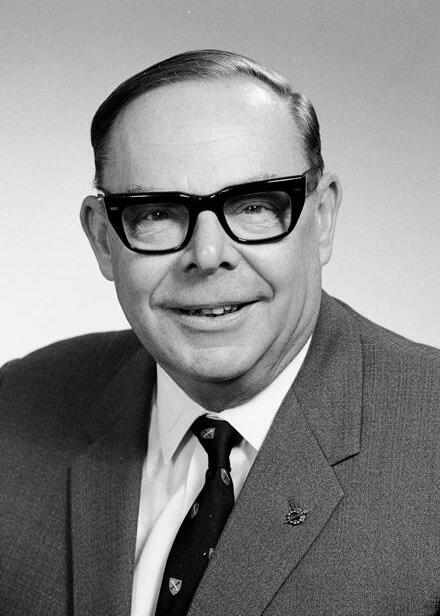
- Dean in 1970

Administrator of the Northern Territory
- In office 1 October 1964 – 4 March 1970
- Preceded by: Roger Nott
- Succeeded by: Fred Chaney

Member of the Australian Parliament for Robertson
- In office 10 December 1949 – 30 September 1964
- Preceded by: Thomas Williams
- Succeeded by: William Bridges-Maxwell

Personal details
- Born: 12 December 1913 Darlinghurst, New South Wales, Australia
- Died: 7 January 1998 (aged 84) Turramurra, New South Wales, Australia
- Party: Liberal
- Spouse: Ann Manning (m. 1950; died 1982)
- Occupation: Business executive

Roger Levinge Dean, CBE (10 December 1913 – 7 January 1998) was an Australian politician and public servant. He was a member of the House of Representatives from 1949 to 1964, representing the New South Wales seat of Robertson for the Liberal Party. He later served as Administrator of the Northern Territory from 1964 to 1970 and as Australia's consul-general in San Francisco from 1970 to 1974.

== Early life and education ==
Roger Levinge Dean was born on 10 December 1913 in Darlinghurst, New South Wales. He was the son of Freda Mary (née Levinge) and Charles Dean. His father was a pottery manufacturer and company director.

Dean's parents moved to Newcastle, New South Wales when he was a young child, where he attended Broughton School and Newcastle Boys' High School. He left school in 1931 and began working as a clerk for Rylands Brothers Pty Ltd, a wire manufacturer.

He joined the Citizen Military Forces in April 1941 and transferred to the Australian Imperial Force in August 1942. Dean served in the Northern Territory with the 103rd Anti-Tank Regiment from 1942 to 1944 and was later stationed at Wewak, New Guinea, with the 8th Docks (Port) Operating Company, part of the Australian Army Transportation Corps. After the war's end, he returned to Rylands Brothers as an administrative officer.

== Politics ==
Dean was secretary of the Mayfield branch of the Liberal Party in the late 1940s. He was elected to the House of Representatives at the 1949 federal election, winning the seat of Robertson from the incumbent Australian Labor Party MP Thomas Williams.

In parliament, Dean was chair of the Joint Statutory Committee on Public Works from 1962 to 1964. In 1963 he chaired a House select committee into grievances raised in the Yirrkala bark petitions over the treatment of the Yirrkala people on their Arnhem Land reserve in the Northern Territory. The committee unanimously recommended the federal government pay compensation to the Yirrkala over the expropriation of land for an alumina project on the Gove Peninsula.

Dean spoke frequently in parliament on matters relating to Indigenous Australians and the Territory of Papua and New Guinea. He was also an advocate for closer relations between Australia and South-East Asia. He studied the Malay language and "regularly entertained South-East Asian students at his Gosford home".

== Later career ==
In 1964, Dean was appointed Administrator of the Northern Territory by the Menzies government. He accordingly resigned from parliament on 30 September 1964.

Dean was the last administrator to serve as ex officio president of the Northern Territory Legislative Council, with the body electing its own president after the 1965 election. As administrator he was credited with the establishment of a tourism body, reforms to pastoral leases, and the conferral of greater regulatory powers on the Northern Territory Land Board. He also visited a number of remote Aboriginal communities and was responsible for a major renovation of Government House, Darwin. In 1964, shortly after his appointment, he attracted attention for his decision to wear shorts on official business.

In December 1969, it was announced that Dean would retire as Northern Territory administrator in March 1970 and would instead be posted to the United States as Australia's consul-general in San Francisco. He remained in that role until 1974.

== Personal life and honours ==
In 1950, Dean married Ann Manning, with whom he had two children. Outside of politics he was active in the Food for Babies Fund, the Order of the British Empire Association, and the Australian-American Association. He was a member of the Anglican Synod of New South Wales from 1960 to 1962.

He was appointed Commander of the Order of the British Empire (CBE) in 1968.

Dean retired to Sydney and was widowed in 1982. He died on 7 January 1998 in Turramurra, New South Wales.

Political offices
Preceded by Roger Nott	Administrator of the Northern Territory; 1964–1970	Succeeded by Fred Chaney
Parliament of Australia
Preceded by Thomas Williams	Member for Robertson; 1949–1964	Succeeded by William Bridges-Maxwell
Diplomatic posts
Preceded by Neil Truscott	Australian Consul-General in San Francisco; 1970–1974	Succeeded by John McCredie
