= Division of Robertson =

Australian federal electoral division

Coordinates: 33.382°S 151.213°E

Robertson Australian House of Representatives Division
- Interactive map of electorate boundaries from the 2025 federal election
- Created: 1901
- MP: Gordon Reid
- Party: Labor
- Namesake: Sir John Robertson
- Electors: 114,983 (2025)
- Area: 939 km^{2} (362.5 sq mi)
- Demographic: Provincial

The Division of Robertson is an Australian electoral division in the state of New South Wales.

Originally located in rural central NSW at Federation, the division has gradually moved eastwards in successive redistributions to the Central Coast, which it still covers as of 2025.

== Geography ==
Since 1984, federal electoral division boundaries in Australia have been determined by a redistribution committee appointed by the Australian Electoral Commission. Redistributions in a particular state occur every seven years, or sooner if a state's representation entitlement changes, or when divisions in a state are malapportioned.

When the division was created in 1900, it was located in the state's Central West, west of the Blue Mountains. It included Dubbo, Wellington and Mudgee. In 1906, it was shifted east into the Upper Hunter, losing Dubbo but gained Murrurundi, Scone, Muswellbrook, Singleton and Branxton.

In 1913, it expanded into the Central Coast up to the Hawkesbury River, and gained areas such as Morisset, Gosford, Wyong and The Entrance. However, it also lost Wellington in the Central West to the Division of Calare. In 1922, it gained areas north of Newcastle. It effectively surrounded the city and the lower Hunter Valley, but did not include the city itself. The gains in the north included Raymond Terrace, Bulahdelah and Forster. The division also lost Murrurundi, Scone and Branxton.

In 1934, the division lost the northern areas it gained in 1922, as well as losing Mudgee and Muswellbrook. At the same time, it expanded into Sydney, gaining many areas in north-west Sydney previously part of the Division of Parramatta, particularly areas north and west of Parramatta (but not inclusive). These areas include Blacktown, Rouse Hill, Castle Hill, Dural and Hornsby. It also extended into Old Guildford south of Parramatta. In 1949, the division started to shrink in area. It lost most of the Sydney areas to the new Division of Mitchell, except Hornsby and the surrounding Ku-ring-gai areas. It also lost regional areas to the north and west, including Singleton. In 1968, it shrunk again to cover the Central Coast only, losing any remaining areas in Sydney (to the new Division of Berowra) and the Hunter. In the 1977 and 1984 redistributions, it further lost the northern areas of the Central Coast, with these northern areas becoming the Division of Dobell in the latter redistribution. Since 1984, the division only covered the southern areas of the Central Coast generally centred around Gosford, with some minor boundary changes during redistributions.

Since 1949, there is no longer an overlap between the division and the area it originally covered at federation, as the division had effectively moved south-east from the Central West towards the Central Coast gradually over time.

Since 2025, the division covers only the south-western half of the Central Coast Council. It encompasses Gosford and the towns of Woy Woy, Gosford and Terrigal.

== History ==
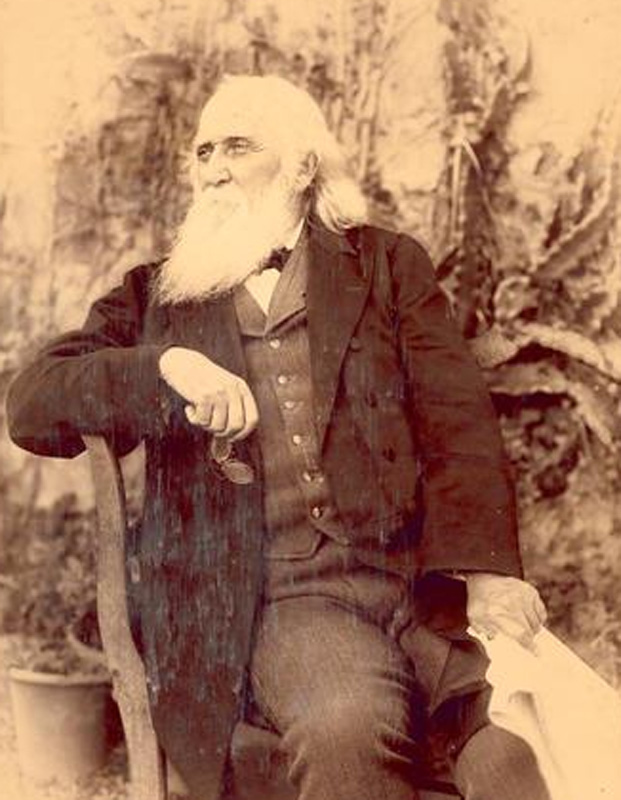
Sir John Robertson, the namesake of the division

The division was proclaimed at Federation, and was one of the original 65 divisions to be contested at the first federal election in 1901. It was named after the fifth Premier of New South Wales, Sir John Robertson, and was originally centred in rural central NSW, encompassing the area around Dubbo, Mudgee and Wellington. It moved eastwards to the Central Coast to take in Gosford in 1913.

The division no longer includes any of its original territory, but has retained the name of Robertson, in part because the Australian Electoral Commission is required to preserve the names of original electorates where possible.

Two of its members have served as Senators prior or subsequent to their tenures in Robertson. Former senator, Belinda Neal, was elected in Robertson in 2007, and Deborah O'Neill became a senator shortly after losing Robertson in 2013.

In recent years, Robertson has been a bellwether electorate in federal elections, and has taken on a character similar to mortgage belt seats on Sydney's outer fringe. It has been held by a member of the party of government since the 1983 federal election. After Mike Kelly became the first opposition MP elected to represent Eden-Monaro (in 2016) since 1975, Robertson currently holds the record for the longest-running bellwether seat in Australia.

The current Member for Robertson, since the 2022 federal election, is Gordon Reid, a member of the Australian Labor Party.

=== The new bellwether ===
Ahead of the 2016 election, ABC psephologist Antony Green listed Robertson in his election guide as one of eleven which he classed as bellwether electorates. Prior to the 2016 election, the seat of Eden-Monaro had been long-regarded as Australia's premier bellwether electorate. From the 1972 election until the 2013 election – over 40 years – Eden-Monaro had been won by the party that also won government.

However, Eden-Monaro lost that title after the Labor opposition won it at the 2016 election, and the nation's new longest-running bellwether is Robertson – continually won by the party that won government since the 1983 election. This trend in Robertson continued in the 2022 and 2025 elections, with Labor winning the seat and Government.

== Members ==
Image	Member	Party	Term	Notes
	Henry Willis (1860–1950)	Free Trade	29 March 1901 – 1906	Lost seat. Later elected to the New South Wales Legislative Assembly seat of Upper Hunter in 1910
	Henry Willis (1860–1950)	Anti-Socialist	1906 – 26 May 1909	Lost seat. Later elected to the New South Wales Legislative Assembly seat of Upper Hunter in 1910
	Henry Willis (1860–1950)	Liberal	26 May 1909 – 13 April 1910	Lost seat. Later elected to the New South Wales Legislative Assembly seat of Upper Hunter in 1910
	William Johnson (1871–1916)	Labor	13 April 1910 – 31 May 1913	Lost seat
	William Fleming (1874–1961)	Liberal	31 May 1913 – 17 February 1917	Previously held the New South Wales Legislative Assembly seat of Upper Hunter. Lost seat
	William Fleming (1874–1961)	Nationalist	17 February 1917 – March 1921	Previously held the New South Wales Legislative Assembly seat of Upper Hunter. Lost seat
	William Fleming (1874–1961)	Country	March 1921 – 16 December 1922	Previously held the New South Wales Legislative Assembly seat of Upper Hunter. Lost seat
	Sydney Gardner (1884–1965)	Nationalist	16 December 1922 – 7 May 1931	Served as Chief Government Whip in the House under Lyons. Lost seat
	Sydney Gardner (1884–1965)	United Australia	7 May 1931 – 21 September 1940	Served as Chief Government Whip in the House under Lyons. Lost seat
	Eric Spooner (1891–1952)	United Australia	21 September 1940 – 21 August 1943	Previously held the New South Wales Legislative Assembly seat of Ryde and served as Deputy Leader of the United Australia Party in NSW. Served as minister under Menzies and Fadden. Lost seat
	Thomas Williams (1897–1992)	Labor	21 August 1943 – 10 December 1949	Lost seat
	Roger Dean (1913–1998)	Liberal	10 December 1949 – 30 September 1964	Resigned to become Administrator of the Northern Territory
	William Bridges-Maxwell (1929–1992)	Liberal	5 December 1964 – 25 October 1969	Lost seat
	Barry Cohen (1935–2017)	Labor	25 October 1969 – 19 February 1990	Served as minister under Hawke. Retired
	Frank Walker (1942–2012)	Labor	24 March 1990 – 2 March 1996	Previously held the New South Wales Legislative Assembly seat of Georges River. Served as minister under Keating. Lost seat
	Jim Lloyd (1954–)	Liberal	2 March 1996 – 24 November 2007	Served as Chief Government Whip in the House under Howard. Served as minister under Howard. Lost seat
	Belinda Neal (1963–)	Labor	24 November 2007 – 19 July 2010	Previously a member of the Senate. Lost preselection and retired
	Deborah O'Neill (1961–)	Labor	21 August 2010 – 7 September 2013	Lost seat. Later appointed to the Senate in 2013
	Lucy Wicks (1973–)	Liberal	7 September 2013 – 21 May 2022	Lost seat
	Gordon Reid (1992–)	Labor	21 May 2022 – present	Incumbent

== Election results ==
2025 Australian federal election: Robertson
Party	Candidate	Votes	%	±%
Labor	Gordon Reid	45,411	44.76	+7.12
Liberal	Lucy Wicks	30,831	30.39	−9.58
Greens	Cheryl Wallace	9,119	8.99	−1.03
One Nation	Matt Lloyd	7,032	6.93	+3.09
Legalise Cannabis	Tom Lillicrap	3,497	3.45	+3.45
Independent	Lisa Bellamy	3,376	3.33	+3.33
Trumpet of Patriots	David Borg	2,197	2.17	+1.94
Total formal votes		101,463	95.41	+1.53
Informal votes		4,876	4.59	−1.53
Turnout		106,339	92.53	+1.58
Two-party-preferred result
Labor	Gordon Reid	60,235	59.37	+7.14
Liberal	Lucy Wicks	41,228	40.63	−7.14
Labor hold		Swing	+7.14	

2022 Australian federal election: Robertson
Party	Candidate	Votes	%	±%
Liberal	Lucy Wicks	38,448	39.96	−6.90
Labor	Gordon Reid	36,231	37.66	+3.56
Greens	Shelly McGrath	9,642	10.02	+2.11
One Nation	Billy O'Grady	3,679	3.82	+3.82
United Australia	Barbara-Jane Murray	2,792	2.90	+0.09
Animal Justice	Patrick Murphy	1,949	2.03	−0.05
Indigenous-Aboriginal	Jeffrey Lawson	1,127	1.17	+1.17
Informed Medical Options	Kate Mason	1,114	1.16	+1.16
Liberal Democrats	Bentley Logan	736	0.76	+0.76
Citizens	Paul Borthwick	272	0.28	+0.28
Federation	Alexandra Hafner	220	0.23	+0.23
Total formal votes		96,210	93.88	+1.12
Informal votes		6,274	6.12	−1.12
Turnout		102,484	91.07	−2.10
Two-party-preferred result
Labor	Gordon Reid	50,277	52.26	+6.50
Liberal	Lucy Wicks	45,933	47.74	−6.50
Labor gain from Liberal		Swing	+6.50	

Alluvial diagram for preference flows in the seat of Robertson in the 2022 federal election. indicates at what stage the winning candidate had over 50% of the votes and was declared the winner.
