= Outline of Christmas Island =

External territory of Australia

The Flag of Christmas Island

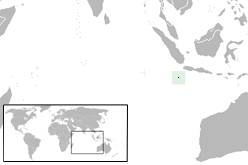
The location of Christmas Island

An enlargeable relief map of the Australian Territory of Christmas Island

The following outline is provided as an overview of and topical guide to Christmas Island:

Christmas Island is a small territory of Australia located in the Indian Ocean, 2,600 kilometres (1600 mi) north-west of Perth, Western Australia, 500 kilometres (300 mi) south of Jakarta, Indonesia, and 975 kilometres ENE of the Cocos (Keeling) Islands. Christmas Island supports about 1,600 residents, who live in a number of "settlement areas" on the northern tip of the island: Flying Fish Cove (also known as Kampong), Silver City, Poon Saan and Drumsite.

== General reference ==
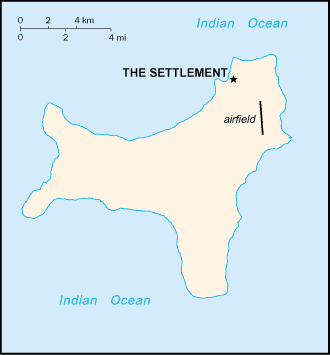
An enlargeable basic map of Christmas Island

- Pronunciation:
- Common English country name: Christmas Island
- Official English country name: The Australian Territory of Christmas Island
- Common endonym(s):
- Official endonym(s):
- Adjectival(s): Christmas Island
- Demonym(s):
- ISO country codes: CX, CXR, 162
- ISO region codes: See ISO 3166-2:CX
- Internet country code top-level domain: .cx

== Geography of Christmas Island ==
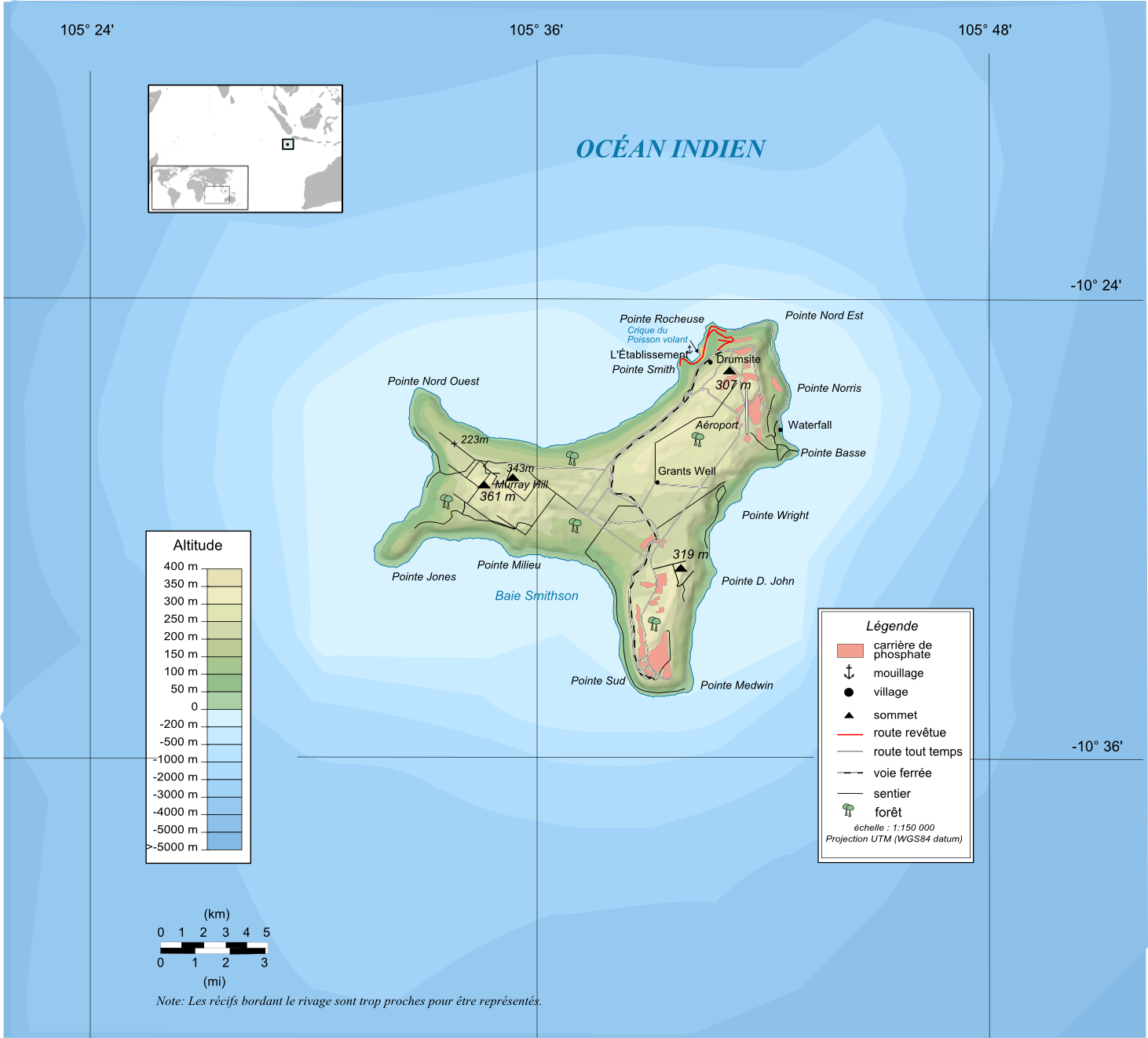
An enlargeable topographic map of Christmas Island

Geography of Christmas Island

- Christmas Island is: an island and territory of Australia
- Location:
  - Southern Hemisphere and Eastern Hemisphere
  - Eurasia (though not on the mainland)
    - Asia
      - Southeast Asia
        - Maritime Southeast Asia
  - Time zone: UTC+07
  - Extreme points of Christmas Island
    - High: Murray Hill 361 m (1,184 ft)
    - Low: Indian Ocean 0 m
  - Land boundaries: none
  - Coastline: 138.9 km
- Population of Christmas Island:
- Area of Christmas Island: 135 km^{2}
- Atlas of Christmas Island

=== Environment of Christmas Island ===
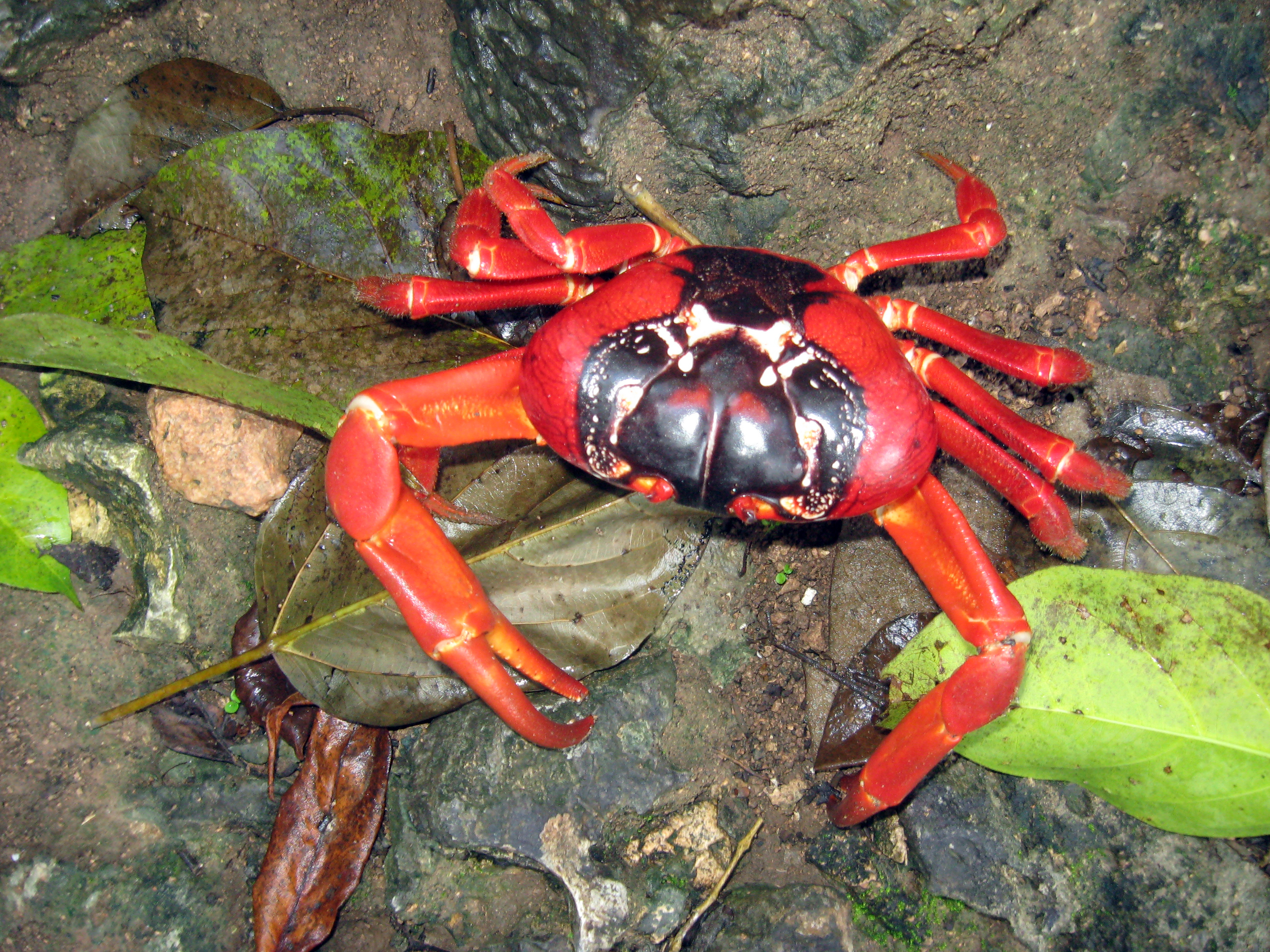
Christmas Island red crab

- Climate of Christmas Island
- Environmental issues on Christmas Island
- Renewable energy in Christmas Island
- Geology of Christmas Island
- Protected areas of Christmas Island
  - Biosphere reserves in Christmas Island
  - National parks of Christmas Island
- Wildlife of Christmas Island
  - Fauna of Christmas Island
    - Birds of Christmas Island
    - Mammals of Christmas Island
    - Reptiles of Christmas Island

==== Natural geographic features of Christmas Island ====
- Fjords of Christmas Island
- Glaciers of Christmas Island
- Islands of Christmas Island
- Lakes of Christmas Island
- Mountains of Christmas Island
- Rivers of Christmas Island
- World Heritage Sites in Christmas Island: None

==== Ecoregions of Christmas Island ====
Ecoregions in Christmas Island

==== Administrative divisions of Christmas Island ====
None

- Capital of Christmas Island: Flying Fish Cove

=== Demography of Christmas Island ===
Demographics of Christmas Island

== Government and politics of Christmas Island ==
Government of Christmas Island

- Form of government: local government area
- Capital of Christmas Island: Flying Fish Cove
- Elections in Christmas Island
  - 2023 Christmas Island and Cocos (Keeling) Islands local elections

=== Branches of government ===
Government of Christmas Island

Executive branch

- Head of State: King of Australia, Charles III (represented by Governor-General of Australia, Sam Mostyn).
- Head of Government: Administrator of Christmas Island, Farzian Zainal

Legislative branch

- Parliament of Australia
  - Australian Senate represented by Northern Territory senators
  - Australian House of Representatives included in the Division of Lingiari

Judicial branch

- Supreme Court of Christmas Island

=== Foreign relations of Christmas Island ===
Foreign relations of Christmas Island

==== International organization membership ====
- none

=== Law and order in Christmas Island ===
Law of Christmas Island

- Constitution of Christmas island
- Law enforcement in Christmas Island

== History of Christmas Island ==
History of Christmas Island

- Battle of Christmas Island

== Culture of Christmas Island ==
Culture of Christmas Island

- Architecture of Christmas Island
- Cuisine of Christmas Island
- Festivals in Christmas Island
- Languages of Christmas Island
- Media in Christmas Island
- National symbols of Christmas Island
  - Coat of arms of Christmas Island
  - Flag of Christmas Island
  - National anthem of Christmas Island
- People of Christmas Island
- Public holidays in Christmas Island
- Records of Christmas Island
- Religion in Christmas Island
  - Christianity in Christmas Island
  - Hinduism in Christmas Island
  - Islam in Christmas Island

== Economy and infrastructure of Christmas Island ==
Economy of Christmas Island

- Economic rank, by nominal GDP (2007):
  - Internet in Christmas Island
- Companies of Christmas Island
- Currency of Christmas Island: Dollar
  - ISO 4217: AUD
- Energy in Christmas Island
  - Energy policy of Christmas Island
  - Oil industry in Christmas Island
- Mining in Christmas Island
- Tourism in Christmas Island
  - Christmas Island Resort
  - Christmas Island National Park

== mas Island ==
Education in Christmas Island

- Christmas Island District High School

== Infrastructure of Christmas Island ==
- Health care in Christmas Island
- Transportation in Christmas Island
  - Airports in Christmas Island
  - Rail transport in Christmas Island

== See also ==
Christmas Island

- Index of Christmas Island–related articles
- List of international rankings
- Outline of Asia
- Outline of Australia
- Outline of geography
