= Peperomia rossii =

Scientific classification
- Kingdom: Plantae
- Clade: Tracheophytes
- Clade: Angiosperms
- Clade: Magnoliids
- Order: Piperales
- Family: Piperaceae
- Genus: Peperomia
- Species: P. rossii

Binomial name
- Peperomia rossii Rendle ex Baker f.

Species of flowering plant

Peperomia rossii is a species of plant in the family Piperaceae. It is endemic to Christmas Island, an Australian territory in the northeastern Indian Ocean. Its specific epithet honours the Clunies-Ross family which established the Flying Fish Cove settlement on Christmas Island in 1888.

== Description ==
Peperomia rossii is an epiphytic herb growing to about 50–100 mm in height. It is glabrous, with creeping stems, rooting at the nodes, with an erect flowering shoot. The leaves are usually opposite, elliptic, entire, and 10–30 mm long. It carries many flowers. The fruit is a round berry, less than 1 mm long.

== Status and conservation ==
The plant is known only from the type collection made in 1898, and may be extinct.
