= MV Eidsvold =

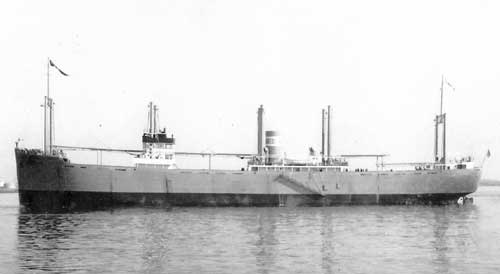
- Eidsvold in Aarhus, Denmark, in March 1935

History

Norway
- Name: Eidsvold
- Owner: Skibs-A/S Eidsiva (1924–40); Nortraship (1940–42)
- Operator: Sverre Ditlev Simonsen & Co.
- Port of registry: Oslo
- Builder: Götaverken A/B
- Yard number: 480
- Launched: 2 June 1934
- Completed: September 1934
- Identification: Code Letters LIVR
- Fate: Torpedoed and sunk by I-159 at Flying Fish Cove, 20 January 1942

General characteristics
- Tonnage: 4,184 GRT, 2,368 NRT, 8,330 DWT
- Length: 116.64 metres (382 ft 8 in)
- Beam: 16.81 metres (55 ft 2 in)
- Depth: 6.93 metres (22 ft 9 in)
- Installed power: Diesel engine, 489 nhp, 2625 bhp
- Propulsion: Screw propeller
- Speed: 12.2 knots (22.6 km/h)
- Complement: 31

Eidsvold was a 4,184 GRT motor vessel built in 1934 at Gothenburg for Norwegian Owners. She was torpedoed and sunk in 1942 by the Japanese submarine I-159.

== Description ==
Eidsvold was 116.64 metres (382 ft 8 in) long, with a beam of 16.89 metres (55 ft 5 in). She had a depth of 6.93 metres (22 ft 9 in). The ship was assessed at 4,184 GRT, 2,368 NRT, 8,330 DWT. She was propelled by a 489nhp six-cylinder four-stroke single cycle single action diesel engine. The engine was built by Götaverken A/B. It was rated at 489 nhp, 2625 bhp and could propel the ship at 12.2 knots (22.6 km/h).

== History ==
Eidsvold was built in as yard number 480 in 1934 by Götaverken A/B, Gothenburg, Sweden for Skibs A/S Eidsiva. She was delivered in September 1934. Eidsvold was operated under the management of Sverre Ditlev Simonsen & Co. Her port of registry was Oslo and the Code Letters LIVR were allocated. In 1940, the vessel was requisitioned by Nortraship.

== Fate ==
On 20 January 1942, Eidsvold was struck by a torpedo from the Japanese submarine I-159 at Flying Fish Cove, Christmas Island. The ship broke in two and was abandoned by her 31 crew. On 6 February, the crew were rescued by HMS Durban. They arrived at Batavia, Netherlands East Indies on 20 February. Her wreck was later towed to near Smith Point.. On 5 October 1942, the wreck was torpedoed by USS Searaven.
