= Ischaemum nativitatis =

Scientific classification
- Kingdom: Plantae
- Clade: Tracheophytes
- Clade: Angiosperms
- Clade: Monocots
- Clade: Commelinids
- Order: Poales
- Family: Poaceae
- Subfamily: Panicoideae
- Genus: Ischaemum
- Species: I. nativitatis

Binomial name
- Ischaemum nativitatis Jansen ex Renvoize

Species of grass

Ischaemum nativitatis, commonly known as the Christmas Island duck-beak, is a tropical grass in the family Poaceae. It is endemic to Christmas Island, an Australian territory in the north-eastern Indian Ocean. The specific epithet comes from the Latin nativitas ("birth") referring to the birth of Christ, or Christmas, after the name of the island.

== Description ==
The Christmas Island duck-beak is an erect, tufted grass, 250–700 mm tall, with the stems often branched and the nodes smooth. The leaves are 30–110 mm long, 2.5–7 mm wide and are scattered along the stem. The two bristly racemes are 15–50 mm long, with long and hairy pedicels and rachis, and with paired, sessile spikelets 4.5 mm long and distinctly awned. The glumes are leathery at the base; the lower, bidentate glume has two membranous wings in the apical half; the upper glume has a winged keel towards the apex and a 6 mm awn. The flowers have glassy lemma and leathery palea about 3.5 mm long, with the awn of the upper lemma 15 mm long and twisted at the base.

== Distribution and habitat ==
The grass occurs sporadically along the northern and western coasts of the island. Habitat types include exposed limestone pinnacles, pockets of coral sand, and near stands of Scaevola taccada and Pandanus nativitatis.

== Taxonomy ==
The grass was first recorded, though not properly described, by Charles William Andrews and Henry Nicholas Ridley as I. foliosum var. leiophyllum Hack. ex Rendle, a variety endemic to Christmas Island. Otto Stapf elevated it to species status, naming it I. nativitatis, but did not publish it. In 1953, a full description was published, but without a Latin diagnosis, leaving the name still invalid under the International Code of Botanical Nomenclature. In 1985, I. nativitatis became the valid name when a full Latin description was published.

Full nomenclatural reference:

- Ischaemum nativitatis Jansen ex Renvoize, Kew Bull. 40: 447. 1985.
  - Ischaemum foliosum var. leiophyllum Hack. ex Rendle, in C.W.Andrews, Monograph Christmas Island 192. 1900. [invalid nomen nudum]
  - Ischaemum nativitatis Jansen, 1953. [invalid nomen nudum]

The grass is closely related to I. foliosum from New Caledonia and Vanuatu.
