= The Dales (Christmas Island) =

Wetland site in the Indian Ocean

Coordinates: 10°28′S 105°33′E

Designations

Ramsar Wetland
- Official name: The Dales, Christmas Island
- Designated: 21 October 2002
- Reference no.: 1225

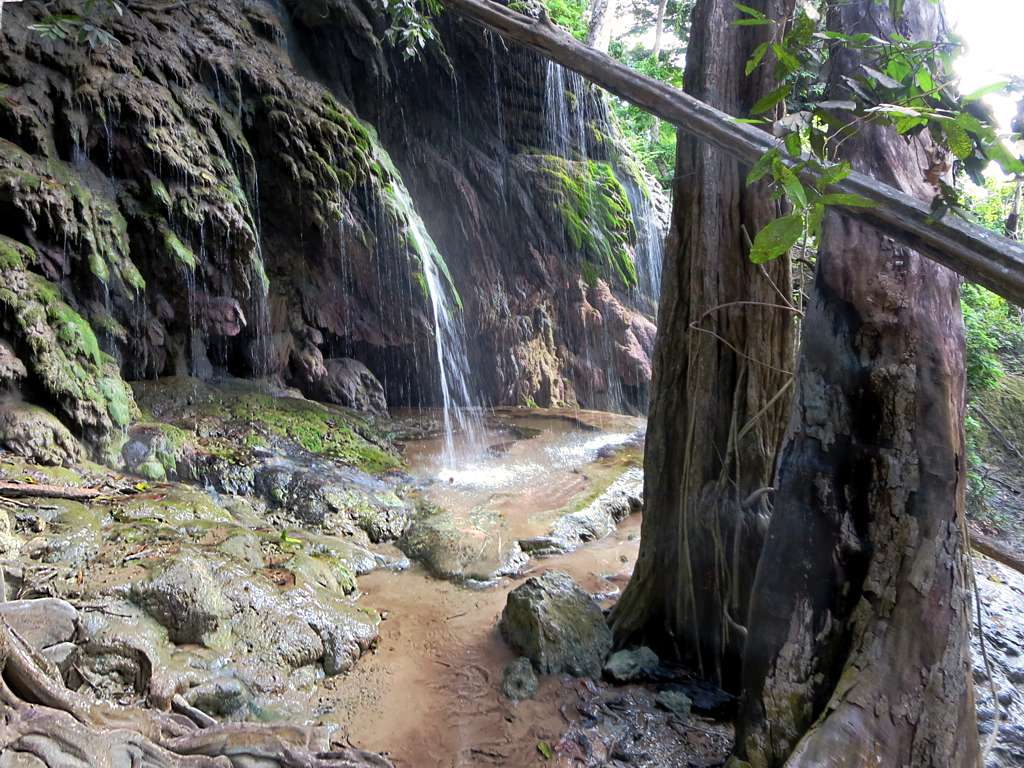
A stream tumbles over Hugh's Dale Waterfall in Christmas Island National Park, Australia. This is one of seven streams in deep valleys running roughly parallel to one another in The Dales.

The Dales is a wetland site located in the west of Christmas Island, an Australian external territory in the eastern Indian Ocean. The site has been recognised as being of international importance by designation under the Ramsar Convention on Wetlands.

== History ==
The Dales were the first location where Europeans set foot on Christmas Island in 1688, during the expedition of William Dampier. Nowadays the Dales are visited by local residents and tourists for sightseeing. One of the subsites, Hugh's Dale, has religious significance for Buddhists of Chinese background.

== Description ==
The site comprises a system of seven watercourses within the Christmas Island National Park, including permanent and perennial streams, permanent springs, the Hugh's Dale waterfall, and most of the surface water on the island. The site is set within tropical rainforest and adjoins the coast. The streams originate from groundwater seepages and flow into the ocean having, over time, worn gullies into the coastal cliffs. It was designated on 21 October 2002 as Ramsar Site 1225, and is the first Australian Ramsar site to contain both surface and subterranean karst features. Area of Ramsar site is about 57 ha. It was also listed on the Directory of Important Wetlands in Australia prior to 2001.

Interesting geological features of the Dales are travertine and rimstone formations of Hugh's Dale and the gully of Sydney's Dale, which closer at the sea gets up to 12 m deep and 9 m wide.

== Flora and fauna ==
The site contains a unique stand of enormous Tahitian chestnut trees. Sydney Dale is a recorded site for the critically endangered endemic fern, the Christmas Island spleenwort. The various wetland types of the Dales support populations of endemic and threatened animals, including the Christmas Island hawk-owl, Christmas Island goshawk, Abbott's booby, Christmas Island shrew and the Christmas Island blind snake. Coastline habitats within the site provide breeding and spawning grounds for red and blue crabs. The main threat to the site comes from introduced species, in particular the yellow crazy ant and the development of Immigration Reception Centre nearby, above the springs.

== Access ==
The road to the site's car-park is for 4WD vehicles only. There are walking tracks from the car-park to Hugh's Dale and Anderson's Dale, with interpretive signage for visitors.
