= Index of Christmas Island–related articles =

This page list topics related to Christmas Island.

== A ==
- Australia
- Australian Indian Ocean Territories

== B ==
- Battle of Christmas Island
- Birds of Christmas Island

== C ==
- Christmas Island District High School
- Christmas Island National Park

== D ==
- Drumsite

== F ==
- Flying Fish Cove

== L ==
- List of people on stamps of Australia

== P ==
- Poon Saan

== S ==
- Shire of Christmas Island
- Silver City

== U ==
- Unidentified body on Christmas Island
- Union of Christmas Island Workers

== See also ==
- Lists of country-related topics - similar lists for other countries
