= Malay Kampong Group =

- Location of Christmas Island in the Indian Ocean
- Location on Christmas Island
- 10.4278°S 105.6720°E
- Location: Jalan Pantai, Flying Fish Cove, Christmas Island, Australia

Commonwealth Heritage List
- Official name: Malay Kampong Group
- Type: Listed place (Historic)
- Designated: 22 June 2004
- Reference no.: 105402

Malay Kampong Group is a heritage-listed Malay precinct at Jalan Pantai, Flying Fish Cove in the Australian territory of Christmas Island. It was added to the Australian Commonwealth Heritage List on 22 June 2004.

== Description ==
The Malay Kampong Group comprises the Malay Club, mosque, Malay Quarters and the adjacent Malay School, the sheep pens to the north of the Malay Club, and the original Malay Cemetery located 300 metres (980 ft) south-west of the Mosque.

Chinese labourers provided most of the manual labour during the early phase of mining on Christmas Island, although later Singapore and Malaya became increasingly important sources of indentured labourers. Malays, from both Cocos-Keeling and Malaya, currently comprise approximately one fifth of the Island's population. The buildings in the Malay Kampong area collectively represent the cultural diversity of this group and their endeavours to keep their religious laws and traditions living in a remote, alien setting. The sites of special significance to the Malay community include the former Malay quarters (Buildings 404, 405, 406 and 407), the Islamic School behind this group of buildings, the Mosque and Malay Club and the sheep pens and slaughter house and an early and possibly the first, Malay cemetery on the Island whose exact location is uncertain.

== Condition ==
The Malay Club sustained damage during a storm in March 1988.

The precinct has a relative degree of intactness. In 2001, it was reported that there had been some major changes nearby, with some demolition and new construction. The Mosque was reported as generally sound, but showing cracks and rotting timber, the Malay School is good condition and having been painted recently, the former Malay quarters in good condition, and other buildings in poor to average condition. The Malay Club was reported to be in fair condition, but showing some seaside corrosion affects, rotting timbers and holes in walling.

== Heritage listing ==
The Malay Kampong Group was listed on the Australian Commonwealth Heritage List on 22 June 2004.

The places that make up the Malay Kampong area are of special significance to the Malay community of Christmas Island and reflect the ways of life of a cultural minority in Australia. The Kampong Area represents one of the main cultural groups on Christmas Island and their endeavours to maintain their religious laws and traditions in a remote setting.

== See also ==
- Islam in Christmas Island
