= Plaintiff M61/2010E v Commonwealth =

Legal case in the High Court of Australia

- Court: High Court of Australia
- Full case name: Plaintiff M61/2010E v Commonwealth of Australia; Plaintiff M69 of 2010 v Commonwealth of Australia
- Decided: 11 November 2010
- Citations: [2010] HCA 41, 243 CLR 319

Court membership
- Judges sitting: French CJ, Gummow, Hayne, Heydon, Crennan, Kiefel and Bell JJ

Plaintiff M61/2010E v Commonwealth of Australia; Plaintiff M69 of 2010 v Commonwealth of Australia is a decision of the High Court of Australia in its "original jurisdiction" under Section 75 of the Constitution of Australia. The plaintiffs were Sri Lankan citizens that had arrived at Christmas Island in 2010. They sought a declaration that they were not given the same procedural fairness as on-shore claimants. The court en banc ruled for the plaintiffs.
