= Brachypeza archytas =

Sage orchid

Scientific classification
- Kingdom: Plantae
- Clade: Tracheophytes
- Clade: Angiosperms
- Clade: Monocots
- Order: Asparagales
- Family: Orchidaceae
- Subfamily: Epidendroideae
- Genus: Brachypeza
- Species: B. archytas

Binomial name
- Brachypeza archytas (Ridl.) Garay

Synonyms
- Saccolabium archytas Ridl.

Species of orchid

Brachypeza archytas, commonly known as sage orchid, is an epiphytic orchid that is endemic to Christmas Island, an Australian territory in the north-eastern Indian Ocean. It has many cord-like roots, four or five leaves arranged like a fan and a large number of small, crowded, short-lived, white flowers.

== Description ==
Brachypeza archytas has short stems which are obscured by aerial roots. It has four or five strap-like leaves 100–220 mm (4–9 in) long, 16–25 mm (0.6–1 in) wide and arranged like the blades of a fan. A large number of crowded, short-lived, white flowers 8–10 mm (0.3–0.4 in) long and 6–8 mm (0.2–0.3 in) wide are arranged on an arching flowering stem 150–350 mm (6–10 in) long. The dorsal sepal is about 8 mm (0.3 in) long and 2.5 mm (0.1 in) wide, the lateral sepals about 6 mm (0.2 in) long and 4 mm (0.2 in) wide. The petals are shorter and narrower than the sepals and the labellum is about 3 mm (0.1 in) long and 5 mm (0.2 in) wide with three lobes. The side lobes are round with purple markings. Flowering occurs from October to April but the flowers only last for one or two days and the buds often fall off without opening.

== Taxonomy and naming ==
Sage orchid was first formally described in 1891 by Henry Nicholas Ridley who gave it the name Saccolabium archytas and published the description in the Journal of the Straits Branch of the Royal Asiatic Society. In 1972, Leslie Andrew Garay changed the name to Brachypeza archytas. The specific epithet (archytas) is a reference to the Classical Greek philosopher Archytas.

== Distribution and habitat ==
Brachypeza archytas is found only on Christmas Island where it is relatively common, especially in rainforest on the island's lower terraces where it is often found on the lower part of large tree trunks, such as those of Tristiropsis acutangula and Gyrocarpus americanus.
