= William Mynors =

Seventeenth century English sea captain

William Mynors was an English sea-captain, master of the East India Company (EIC) vessel Royal Mary. His voyage in 1643 discovered Christmas Island (10°30′S 105°40′E) on Christmas Day of that year, when he sailed past it and named it. Besides this, little is known of Mynors.

Royal Mary served the EIC from 1626 to 1639, and apparently longer.
