= Telephone numbers in Christmas Island =

Telephone numbers in Christmas Island use ranges owned by Australia.

Format +61 8 9164 XXXX

Number range	Usage
+61 8 9164	Christmas Island

Christmas Island numbers used the +672 country code until 1994, when they were migrated to +61.

Date	Number	Country code
pre-1994	(04) 2345	+672
1994–1997	(091) 64 2345	+61
1997–now	(08) 9164 2345	+61
