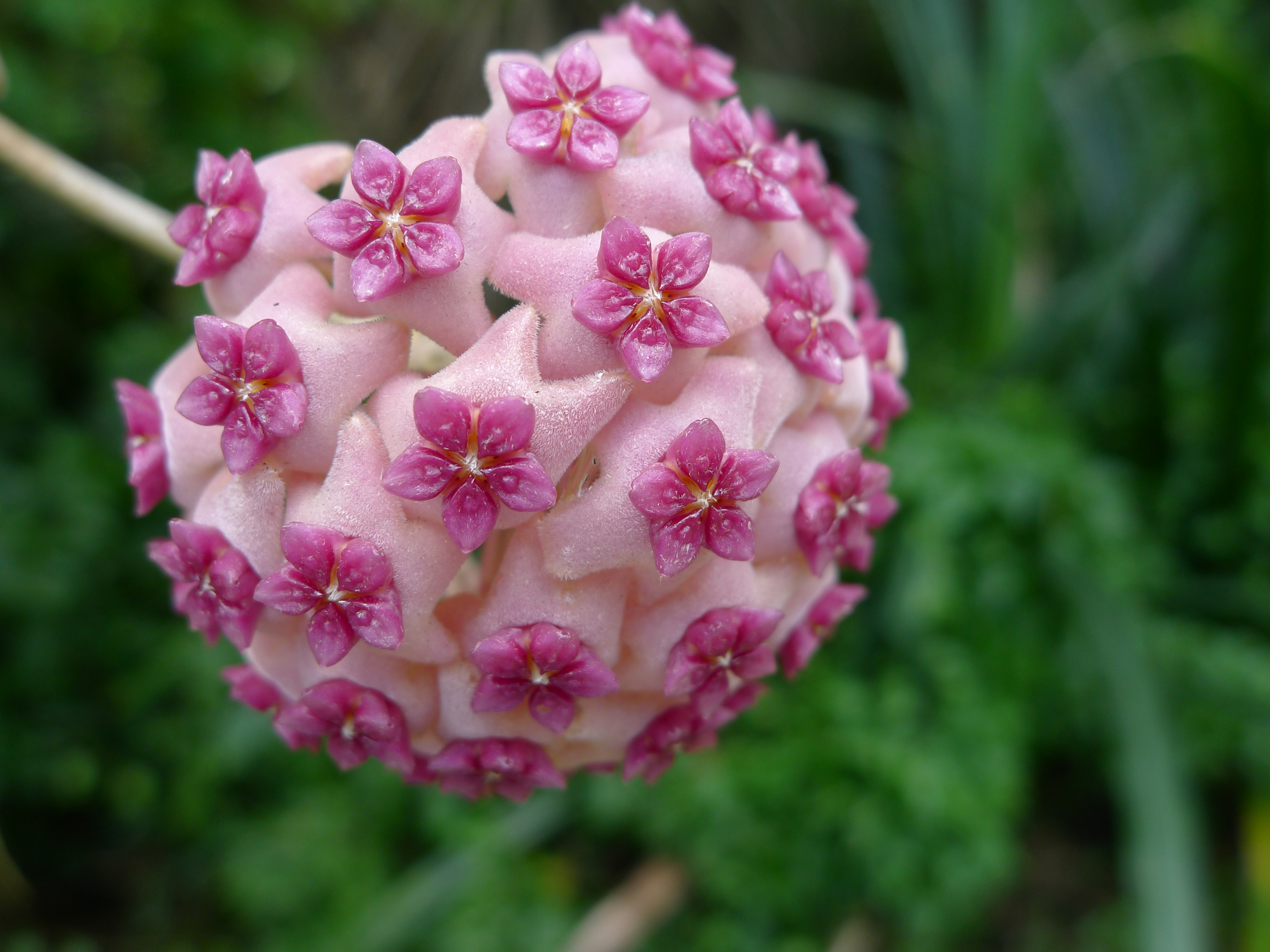

Scientific classification
- Kingdom: Plantae
- Clade: Tracheophytes
- Clade: Angiosperms
- Clade: Eudicots
- Clade: Asterids
- Order: Gentianales
- Family: Apocynaceae
- Genus: Hoya
- Species: H. aldrichii

Binomial name
- Hoya aldrichii Hemsl.

= Hoya aldrichii =

Species of plant

Hoya aldrichii, commonly known as Christmas Island waxvine, is a species of flowering plant in the Apocynaceae or dogbane family. It is a vine that is endemic to Christmas Island, an Australian territory in the north-eastern Indian Ocean.

== Description ==
Hoya aldrichii is a tall climber with glabrous stems and pale bark. The leaves are entire, elliptic, rounded at the base with a pointed tip, 75–150 mm (3.0–5.9 in) long and 35–60 mm (1.4–2.4 in) wide, on a petiole 10–15 mm (0.39–0.59 in) long. The flowers are arranged in umbels of 15–30, on a thicked peduncle 6–10 mm (0.24–0.39 in) long, that increases in length each flowering season, each flower on a glabrous pedicel 20–25 mm (0.79–0.98 in) long. The sepals are 2 mm (0.079 in) long and the petals are pink or white with lobes about 6 mm (0.24 in) long. The corona is pink or deep purplish-pink with star-shaped lobes 3–4 mm (0.12–0.16 in) long and about 1.5 mm (0.059 in) wide. The fruit is a glabrous follicle about 14 mm (0.55 in) long and 5–10 mm (0.20–0.39 in) wide containing oblong seeds about 5 mm (0.20 in) long with a tuft of hairs 20–30 mm (0.79–1.18 in) long on one end.

== Taxonomy ==
Hoya aldrichii was first formally described in 1890 by William Hemsley in the Journal of the Linnean Society, Botany. The specific epithet honours Pelham Aldrich, commander of the survey vessel HMS Egeria, which visited Christmas Island in 1887.

== Distribution and habitat ==
This species of Hoya is a common epiphyte in the shrublands of Christmas Island's coastal terraces.
