= Silver City, Christmas Island =

Human settlement in Australia

Coordinates: 10°26′00.65″S 105°40′59.79″E

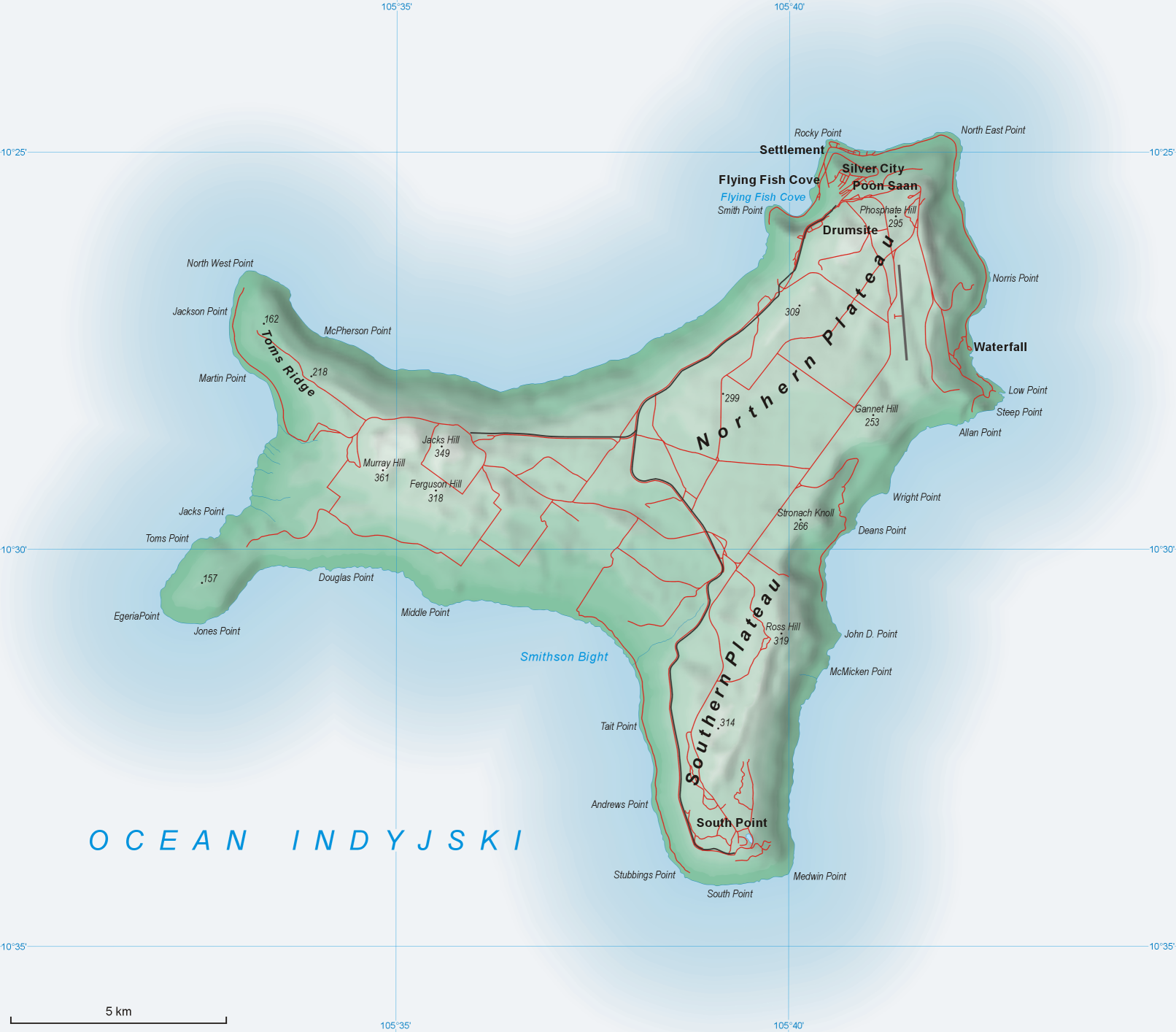
Map of Christmas Island with Silver City marked

Silver City is a village within Flying Fish Cove in the Australian overseas territory of Christmas Island. The population is made up of a mixture of various ethnicities such as Chinese, European, and Malay. The village was founded in the 1970s, and the houses were built to withstand the tropical cyclones.

== Geography ==
The village of Silver City is located within Flying Fish Cove in the Australian overseas territory of Christmas Island. The area is made of uneven terrain with inclinations, resulting is heavier water flow rates during periods of rainfall. The region is home to various avifauna including Asian koel, emerald dove, imperial pigeon, common sandpiper, brown noddy, white-tailed tropicbird, red-tailed tropicbird, great frigatebird, brown booby, Pacific reef heron, nankeen kestrel, Christmas white-eye, Christmas island thrush, Java sparrow, and Eurasian tree sparrow.

== Demographics ==
The population consists of Chinese, European and Malays. The village was founded in the 1970s, and the houses were built with aluminum and other metals with the intention of being able to withstand cyclones. There are also large houses built in the contemporary Australian style. The name Silver City came from being synonymous with the aluminum clad houses.

The locality also had housing owned by the Government of Australia, that were used to detain illegal immigrants who try to or enter Australia without valid documentation. Large storm water drains carry runoff water towards an isolated area of the territory. In the early 2000s, a casino was operated by a private company, which also provided mini-bus services were provided linking it with other communities.
