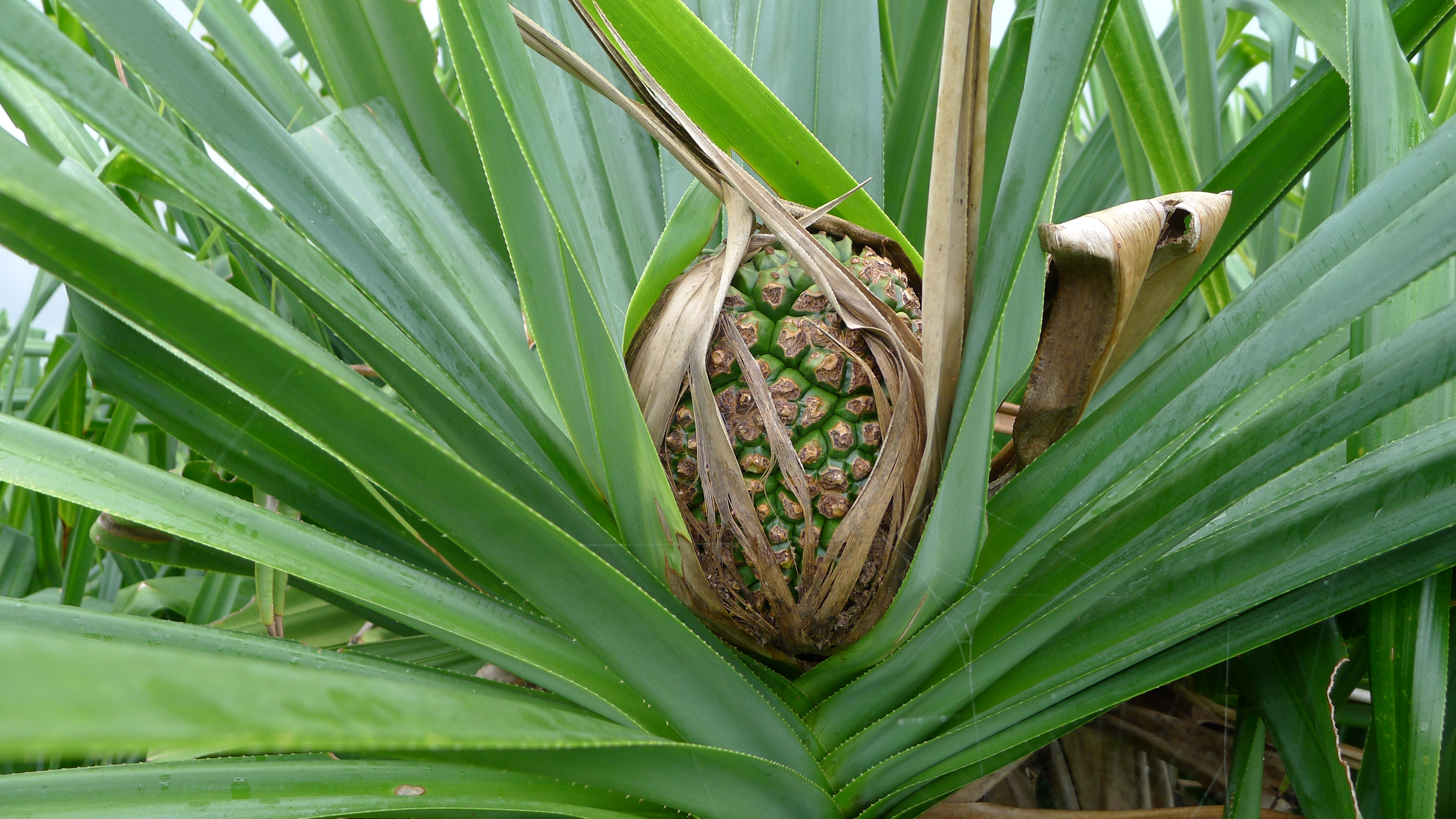

Scientific classification
- Kingdom: Plantae
- Clade: Tracheophytes
- Clade: Angiosperms
- Clade: Monocots
- Order: Pandanales
- Family: Pandanaceae
- Genus: Pandanus
- Species: P. christmatensis

Binomial name
- Pandanus christmatensis Martelli

Synonyms
- Pandanus nativitatis Ridl.

= Pandanus christmatensis =

Species of flowering plant

Pandanus christmatensis is a dioecious tropical plant in the screwpine genus. It is endemic to Christmas Island, an Australian territory in the north-eastern Indian Ocean. The specific epithet, "christmatensis", comes from its native locality.

== Description ==
Pandanus christmatensis is a small tree or shrub, with prop roots, that grows to 10 m in height. Its leaves are 1–2 m long and 50–80 mm wide, dark green and with marginal prickles. The inflorescence has white bracts. The fruit is orange when ripe.

== Distribution and habitat ==
The plant forms dense, tangled thickets on the shore terraces of the island, often next to the sea, on exposed limestone cliffs with little soil. It also occurs inland beneath the rainforest canopy, particularly on limestone scree.

== Taxonomy ==
The plant is closely related to Pandanus tectorius, which is widely distributed through the region, and is very similar to Pandanus platycarpus from Zanzibar.
