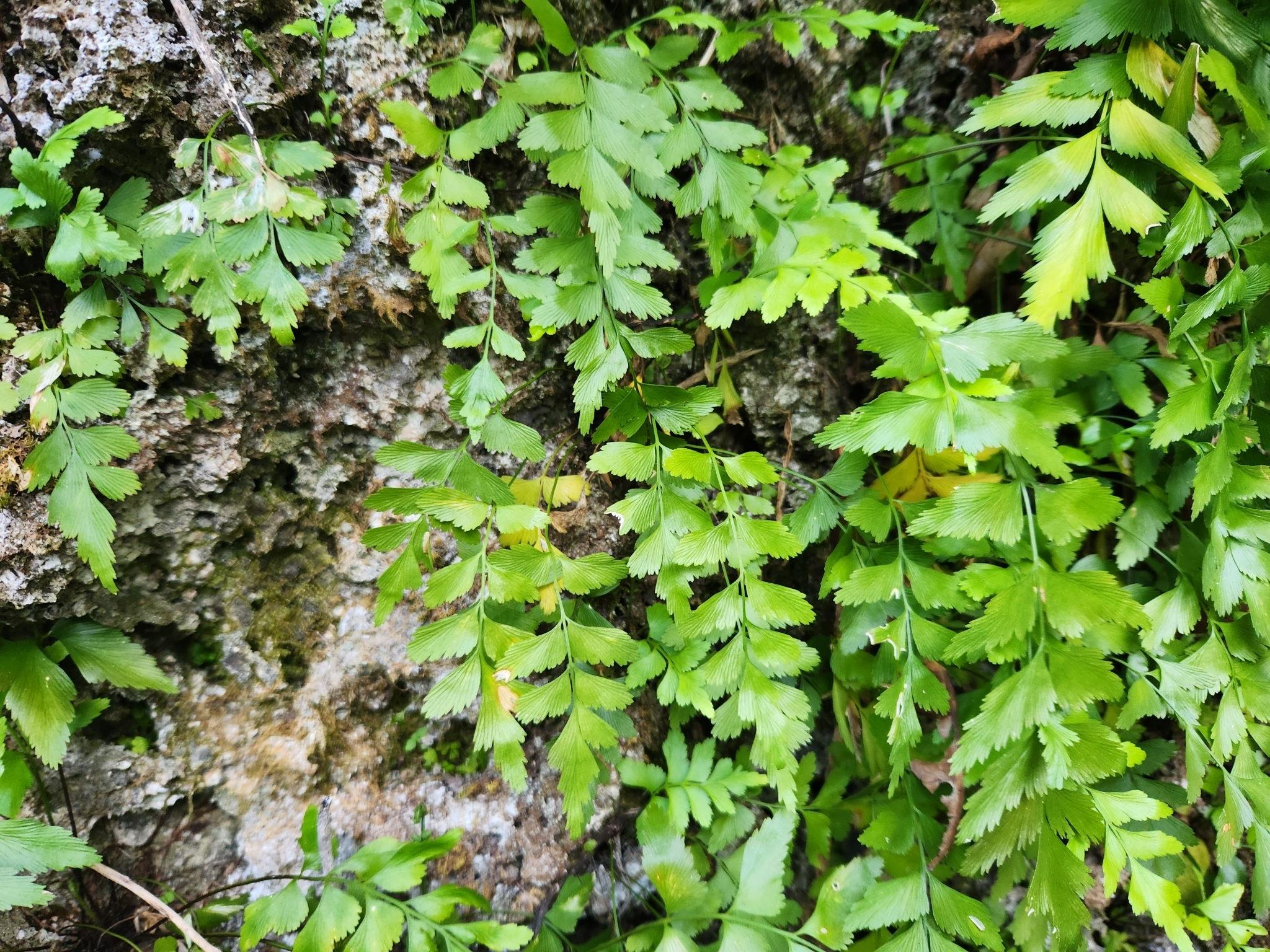

Conservation status
- Critically endangered (EPBC Act)

Scientific classification
- Kingdom: Plantae
- Clade: Tracheophytes
- Division: Polypodiophyta
- Class: Polypodiopsida
- Order: Polypodiales
- Suborder: Aspleniineae
- Family: Aspleniaceae
- Genus: Asplenium
- Species: A. listeri

Binomial name
- Asplenium listeri C.Chr.

= Asplenium listeri =

Christmas Island spleenwort

Species of fern in the spleenwort family

Asplenium listeri, commonly known as the Christmas Island spleenwort, is a species of fern in the family Aspleniaceae. It is endemic to Christmas Island, an Australian territory in the northeastern Indian Ocean. Its specific epithet honours British zoologist and plant collector Joseph Jackson Lister, who visited the island on HMS Egeria in 1887 and was the first to collect a specimen.

== Description ==
The spleenwort is a small, terrestrial, lithophytic fern with shortly creeping rhizomes, and with fronds up to 90 mm (3.5 in) long held in a crown.

== Distribution and habitat ==
Found only on Christmas Island, the fern is known from a very small number of sites, where it grows in crevices on the cliffs and among the rocks of exposed limestone outcrops. It is a rare component of the sparse vegetation community characteristic of the inland cliffs which rise above the rainforest of the terraces, and it has not been recorded from the other vegetation zones of the island. It is likely that the distribution of the species is related to sites which are well placed to capture and retain moisture from the prevailing southeasterly trade winds.

== Taxonomy ==
The Christmas Island spleenwort is closely related to the sympatric Asplenium polyodon G. Forst., known as the Sickle Spleenwort or Mare's Tails Fern. It can be distinguished from the latter by the former species' harder and generally smaller fronds, which may be adaptations to its more exposed lithophytic habitat.

== Status and conservation ==
It was listed as Critically Endangered on 23 July 2002 under Australia's Environment Protection and Biodiversity Conservation Act 1999, when it was known only from a single location. Since then further sites have been found, but the number of known individuals of the species is less than 300, its distribution is very restricted and it is vulnerable to stochastic disturbance events, with two of the four new locations lying outside the Christmas Island National Park.
