= Christmas Island District High School =

Location
- Christmas Island; Australia; 10°26′08″S 105°40′07″E

Information
- Type: Public co-educational early learning, primary, and high day school
- Motto: Persevere
- Established: 1975; 51 years ago
- Educational authority: WA Department of Education
- Principal: Ian Francis; Christina Auld-Bower
- Years: Early learning; K–12
- Enrolment: 235 (2019)
- Campus type: Remote
- Colour: Blue
- Website: www.cidhs.cx

Christmas Island District High School (CIDHS) is a public co-educational early learning, primary, and high day school located in Christmas Island, a territory of Australia. As of 2025 the school served approximately 70 students from Kindergarten through to Year 12. The school is operated by the Western Australian Department of Education.

== Overview ==
Landcare recognised the school's efforts to clear a 90-metre (300 ft) stretch of Greta Beach used as a nesting ground for the green turtle. The beach area is one of the dirtiest on the island as it traps debris brought in by currents. For these continuing efforts, the school was selected as a 2004 Western Australia Landcare Education Award Finalist.

On 5 March 2007, Governor-General of Australia, Michael Jeffery, visited the school and addressed the school assembly.
