= Islam in Christmas Island =

Islam in Christmas Island is the island's largest religion and is primarily practised by the island's ethnic Malay population; the island has no current indigenous population.

The Muslim population is estimated at 19% (2016) of an overall population of 2,205 (2016), by the CIA World Factbook.

The Australian Federation of Islamic Councils includes a council for each state, as well as Australian Capital Territory, Northern Territory, and Christmas Island.

The town of Katanning, Western Australia, has a large population of Christmas Island Muslims.

== Mosque ==
There is only one Islamic mosque in Christmas Island:

- Kampong At-Taqwa mosque

== See also ==
- Islam in the Cocos (Keeling) Islands
- Islam in Hong Kong
- Islam in Macau
- Religion in Abkhazia
- Islam in Cyprus
- Islam in Palestine
- Islam in Taiwan
- Islam in Timor-Leste
- Islam in Turkey
- Islam in Turkmenistan
- Islam in Uzbekistan
- Islam in Vietnam
- Islam in Oman
