= Flying Fish Cove =

Settlement in Christmas Island, Australia

- Town
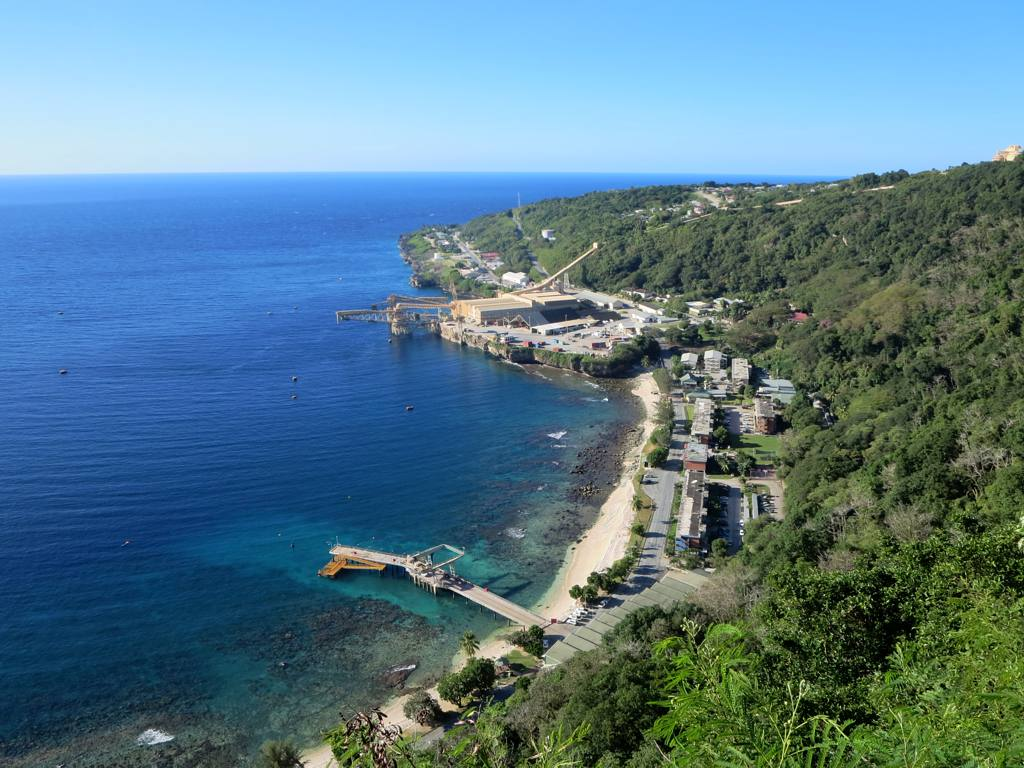
- Panoramic

- Coordinates: 10°25′34″S 105°40′22″E
- Country: Australia
- State: Australia
- LGA: Shire of Christmas Island
- Established: 1888

Government
  - Federal division: Lingiari

Population
  - Total: 1,355 (2021 census)
- Postcode: 6798

Flying Fish Cove
- Simplified Chinese: 飞鱼湾
- Traditional Chinese: 飛魚灣
Transcriptions
Standard Mandarin
- Hanyu Pinyin: Fēiyú Wān
Yue: Cantonese
- Jyutping: Fei^{1}jyu^{4*2} Waan^{1}

Malay name
- Malay: Pantai Ikan Terbang

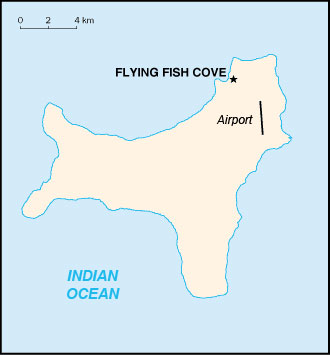
Map of Christmas Island showing the location of Flying Fish Cove

Flying Fish Cove (Chinese: 飞鱼湾, Malay: Pantai Ikan Terbang) is the capital city and main settlement of Christmas Island. Although it was originally named after the British survey-ship Flying Fish, many maps simply label it "The Settlement". It was the first British settlement on the island, established in 1888.

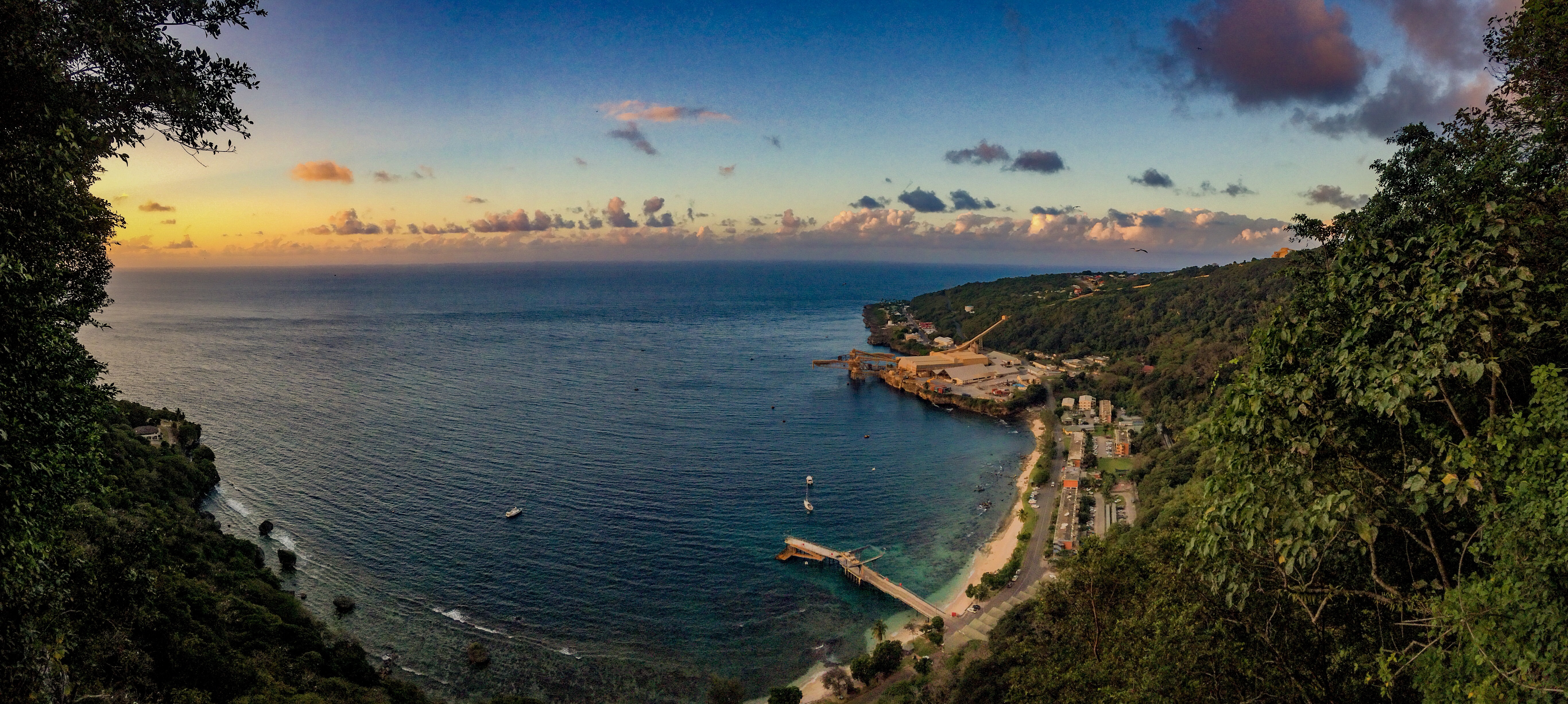
Flying Fish Cove

About a third of the territory's total population of 1,600 lives in Flying Fish Cove, which lies near the north-eastern tip of the island. There is a small harbour which serves tourists with yachts. It is possible to carry out recreational diving at the settlement's beach.

The settlement contains three villages apart from itself – Drumsite, Silver City, and Poon Saan, which are commonly listed as separate locations.

== History ==
The survey vessel HMS Amethyst attempted to explore the island in 1857, but were unable to find a route on the island and abandoned their attempt. Another attempt was made by HMS Flying Fish in January 1887, but failed after facing similar problems. The island was named after the Flying Fish, and a group of settlers from Cocos (Keeling) Islands founded the first settlement on the island in 1888. Phosphate mining was conducted on the island.

== Heritage ==
The settlement is listed on the Australian Commonwealth Heritage List, citing the following aspects of significance:

The buildings that make up the residential precinct are of architectural significance, relatively intact and display considerable unity in a style derived from the British experience in Singapore/Malaya. This unity combines with consistent garden planting and ornamentation and the linear nexus of Gaze Road to create a strong streetscape. The presence of semi-detached servants' quarters are also of historic importance and are indicative of the social and economic stratification which prevailed on the island during the colonial period. The residential area is also historically significant as a reminder of the phase of Christmas Island history when the island came under the control of the British Phosphate Commission and the mining industry and the supporting community, underwent substantial expansion. The Services precinct is of social and historic significance. It includes a number of early Chinese terraced houses as well as a range of structures representing each of the various phases of phosphate mining, including one of the oldest structures on the Island. It was also the Island's main meeting place where Asian workers and European staff came together through a common reliance on retail, health, recreational and other services. The precinct contains a number of buildings of special significance to the community and, along with the three cemeteries, strongly reflects the mixed racial origins of the Island.

The historic Malay Kampong precinct within the town, the Industrial and Administrative Group precinct overlooking the town, and the Administrator's House 1.5 km east of the town are also listed on the Commonwealth Heritage List.

== Works cited ==
- Gibson-Hill, C. (1954). "A Landing on Christmas Island in 1864". Journal of the Malaysian Branch of the Royal Asiatic Society. 27 (1). Malaysian Branch of the Royal Asiatic Society: 218–220. doi:10.2307/41486181. JSTOR 41486181.
- Mitchell, B. (1974). "The Forest Flora of Christmas Island". The Commonwealth Forestry Review. 53 (1). Commonwealth Forestry Association: 19–29. doi:10.2307/42604301. JSTOR 42604301.
