= Murray Road (Christmas Island) =

Major road in Christmas Island

General information
- Type: Road
- Length: 13 km (8.1 mi)

Major junctions
- Northwest end: Gaze Road (Flying Fish Cove)
- South end: East West Baseline Road

Location(s)
- Major suburbs: Poon Saan, Drumsite

Murray Road is a major unnumbered road, about 13 km (8.1 mi) long, on Christmas Island. The road is known for its crab bridge, which is used during the crab migration season.

The road is named after Sir John Murray.

== Route description ==
The road starts in Flying Fish Cove on Gaze Road. The road goes up hill through bushes which then makes a right turn and a few cruves before entering Poon Saan and Drumsite. It goes past the Christmas Island Power Station before making a right turn which goes to the crab bridge and entirely goes through bushes until it ends on East West Baseline Road.

== History ==
The last section of the road was constructed in 1958, but prior to 1958, people had to go on an incline railway from Flying Fish Cove to the upper terrace.

== In popular culture ==
Murray Road is known for the crab bridge which is used for the Christmas Island crab migration season to prevent the crabs from being run over.
