= Christmas Island Power Station =

Power Station in Christmas Island, Australia

- Country: Australia
- Location: Drumsite, Christmas Island
- Coordinates: 10.4411079°S 105.6682993°E
- Status: Commissioned
- Construction began: 2011
- Commission date: 2012

The Christmas Island Power Station is a diesel power station located in Drumsite, Christmas Island, Australia.

The power station was commissioned in 2012 but was constructed in 2011 on Murray Road.

== Description ==
The power station is the largest electricity producer in Christmas Island. The power station has four separate engineered buildings and uses 2.6 MW Wärtsilä W6L32 medium-speed diesel engines, giving the facility a core combined output of roughly 10.4 MW. All of this electricity is produced to houses, shops, mining infrastructure and the North West Point Immigration Detention Centre.
