= Drumsite Industrial Area =

- Location on Christmas Island
- Location on Christmas Island
- 10.4240°S 105.6752°E
- Location: Drumsite, Christmas Island, Australia

Commonwealth Heritage List
- Official name: Drumsite Industrial Area
- Type: Listed place (Historic)
- Designated: 22 June 2004
- Reference no.: 105339

The Drumsite Industrial Area is a heritage-listed industrial precinct at Drumsite in the Australian territory of Christmas Island. It was added to the Australian Commonwealth Heritage List on 22 June 2004.

== Description ==
The Drumsite Industrial Area comprises the remnants of the former incline railway between Drumsite and the power house in Flying Fish Cove, the Spray Painting Shop at the top of the railway and the Sample Shed, now located near the Laboratory. The area has played an important role in the history of phosphate mining on Christmas Island; however, most of the site is now a modern industrial site.

The main area of heritage interest is the remains of the incline railway, constructed in 1914 and the 1930s ore chute system, although other elements have value to segments of the current island community. The railway was the main means of transport between the cove settlement and the upper terrace until construction of the modern road to Poon Saan from 1958. The incline railway began at Drumsite and terminated near the old power station in the main settlement precinct. The average gradient of the line was 1 in 6.5. The permanent way comprises two standard gauge tracks, with a concrete strip between. One track was for rail traffic going up, the other for rail cars going down. Motor vehicles could use the strip in between. At Drumsite, loaded rail wagons were attached to a cable while empty wagons at the bottom of the incline were similarly attached. The empty wagons provided some counterbalance to the full wagons, but the essential power and control was supplied by winding gear which wound the cables over drums at Drumsite. Goods and people were also raised and lowered on the incline. The incline railway system was fundamental to the success and expansion of the mining operation permitting large volumes of ore to be moved from the mining site to the lower terrace for export. It was also a considerable technical achievement. The industrial area also includes the sample shed and paint shed which both apparently housed part of the incline winding gear. The roof of the sample shed includes an unusual arrangement of curving steel struts and is of architectural and technical interest.

== Condition ==
The Drumsite industrial area is now generally a modern industrial site with only a limited number of early historic remains. One half of the incline track is currently used to channel storm water down to the lower terrace, which keeps this half of the track clear. The other half of the incline track is heavily overgrown. The sample shed has been moved from its original position to a location near the laboratory. In 1998, it was being used to house phosphate samples, and at that time was reported to be in fair and structurally sound condition.

== Heritage listing ==
Drumsite Industrial Area was listed on the Australian Commonwealth Heritage List on 22 June 2004.

The incline railway, 1930s chute and winding gear sheds are historically and scientifically significant as evidence of previous phases of the mining industry on Christmas Island and earlier industrial technology. The incline railway is of particular significance as it was fundamental to the success and expansion of the phosphate mining operation on Christmas Island and therefore the development of the Island community, as well as being an outstanding technical and engineering achievement.
