= Animal migration =

Periodic large-scale movement of animals, usually seasonal

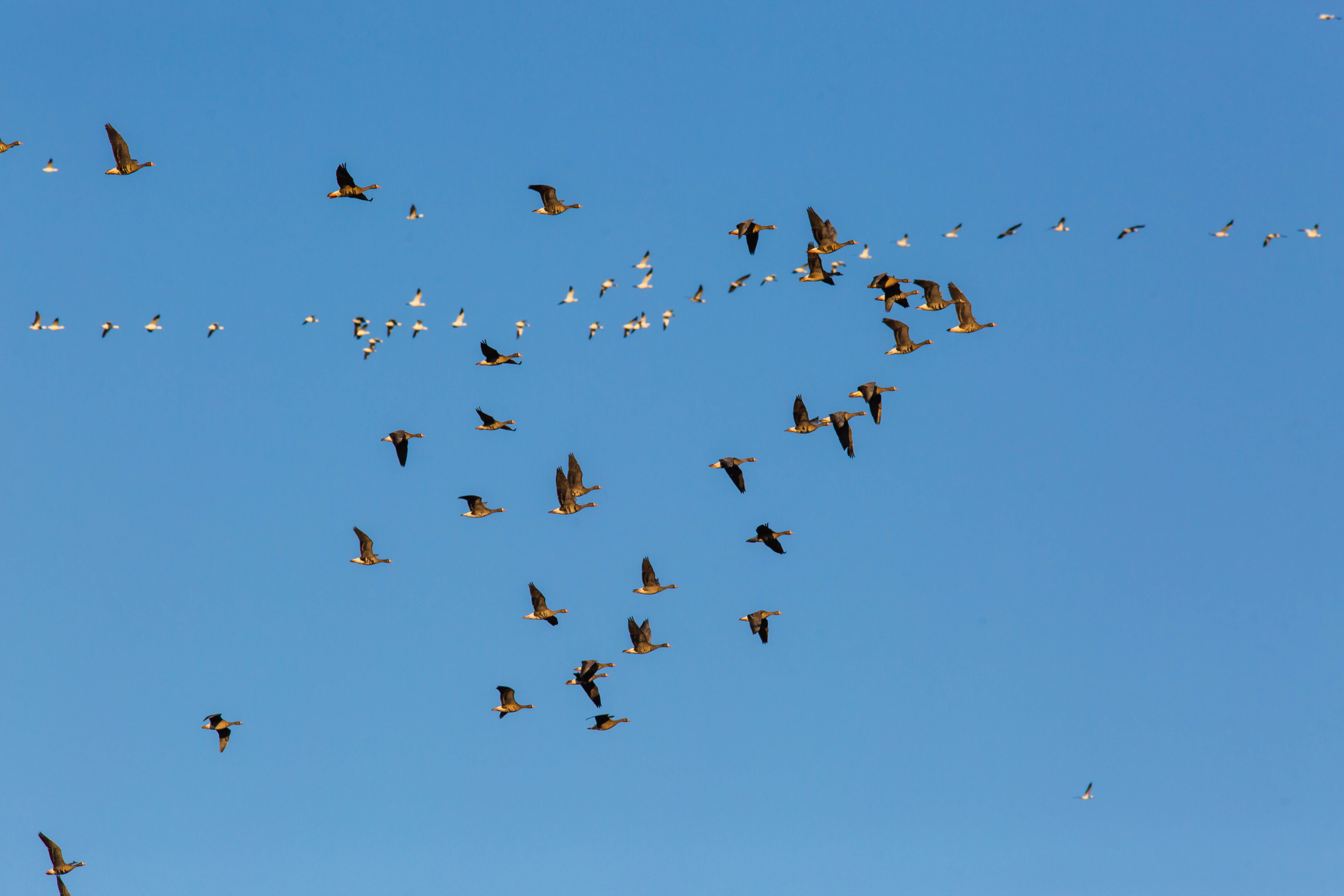
Goose migration is an iconic phenomenon in the Northern Hemisphere.

Animal migration is the relatively long-distance movement of individual animals, usually on a seasonal basis. It is the most common form of migration in ecology. It is found in all major animal groups, including birds, mammals, fish, reptiles, amphibians, insects, and crustaceans. The cause of migration may be local climate, local availability of food, the season of the year or for mating.

To be counted as a true migration, and not just a local dispersal or irruption, the movement of the animals should be an annual or seasonal occurrence, or a major habitat change as part of their life. An annual event could include Northern Hemisphere birds migrating south for the winter, or wildebeest migrating annually for seasonal grazing. A major habitat change could include young Atlantic salmon or sea lamprey leaving the river of their birth when they have reached a few inches in size. Some traditional forms of human migration fit this pattern.

Migrations can be studied using traditional identification tags such as bird rings, or tracked directly with electronic tracking devices. Before animal migration was understood, folklore explanations were formulated for the appearance and disappearance of some species, such as that barnacle geese grew from goose barnacles.

== Overview ==
=== Concepts ===
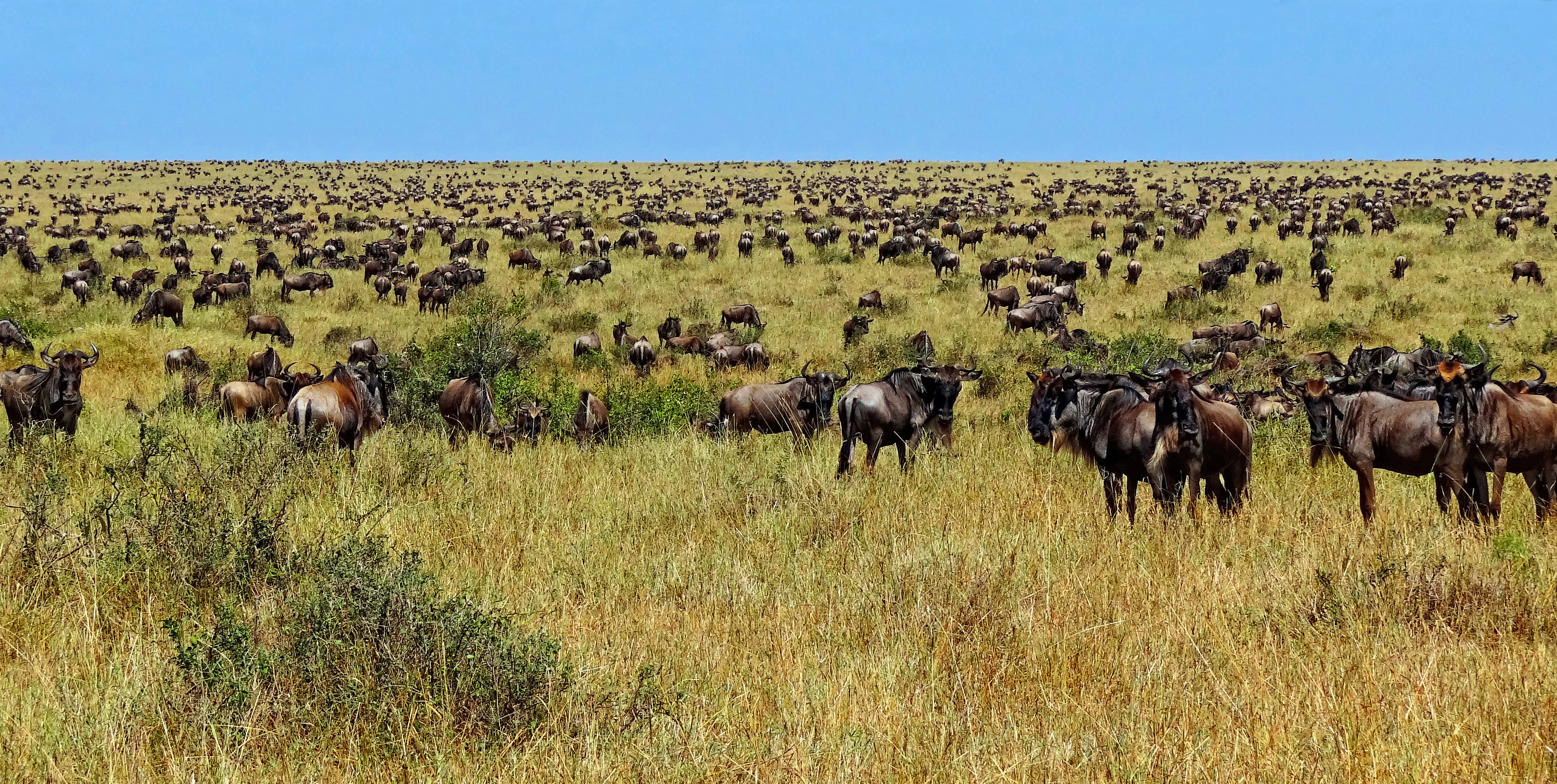
Wildebeest on the Serengeti 'great migration'

Migration can take very different forms in different species, and has a variety of causes. As such, there is no simple accepted definition of migration. One of the most commonly used definitions, proposed by the zoologist J. S. Kennedy is

Migratory behavior is persistent and straightened-out movement effected by the animal's own locomotory exertions or by its active embarkation on a vehicle. It depends on some temporary inhibition of station-keeping responses, but promotes their eventual disinhibition and recurrence.

Migration encompasses four related concepts: persistent straight movement; relocation of an individual on a greater scale (in both space and time) than its normal daily activities; seasonal to-and-fro movement of a population between two areas; and movement leading to the redistribution of individuals within a population. Migration can be either obligate, meaning individuals must migrate, or facultative, meaning individuals can "choose" to migrate or not. Within a migratory species or even within a single population, often not all individuals migrate. Complete migration is when all individuals migrate, partial migration is when some individuals migrate while others do not, and differential migration is when the difference between migratory and non-migratory individuals is based on discernible characteristics like age or sex. Irregular (non-cyclical) migrations such as irruptions can occur under pressure of famine, overpopulation of a locality, or some more obscure influence.

=== Seasonal ===
Seasonal migration is the movement of various species from one habitat to another during the year. Resource availability changes depending on seasonal fluctuations, which influence migration patterns. Some species such as Pacific salmon migrate to reproduce; every year, they swim upstream to mate and then return to the ocean. Temperature is a driving factor of migration that is dependent on the time of year. Many species, especially birds, migrate to warmer locations during the winter to escape poor environmental conditions.

=== Circadian ===
Circadian migration is where birds utilise circadian rhythm (CR) to regulate migration in both fall and spring. In circadian migration, clocks of both circadian (daily) and circannual (annual) patterns are used to determine the birds' orientation in both time and space as they migrate from one destination to the next. This type of migration is advantageous in birds that, during the winter, remain close to the equator, and also allows the monitoring of the auditory and spatial memory of the bird's brain to remember an optimal site of migration. These birds also have timing mechanisms that provide them with the distance to their destination.

=== Tidal ===
Tidal migration is the use of tides by organisms to move periodically from one habitat to another. This type of migration is often used in order to find food or mates. Tides can carry organisms horizontally and vertically for as little as a few nanometres to even thousands of kilometres. The most common form of tidal migration is to and from the intertidal zone during daily tidal cycles. These zones are often populated by many different species and are rich in nutrients. Organisms like crabs, nematodes, and small fish move in and out of these areas as the tides rise and fall, typically about every twelve hours. The cycle movements are associated with foraging of marine and bird species. Typically, during low tide, smaller or younger species will emerge to forage because they can survive in the shallower water and have less chance of being preyed upon. During high tide, larger species can be found due to the deeper water and nutrient upwelling from the tidal movements. Tidal migration is often facilitated by ocean currents.

=== Diel ===
While most migratory movements occur on an annual cycle, some daily movements are also described as migration. Many aquatic animals make a diel vertical migration, travelling a few hundred metres up and down the water column, while some jellyfish make daily horizontal migrations of a few hundred metres.

== In specific groups ==
Different kinds of animals migrate in different ways.

=== In birds ===
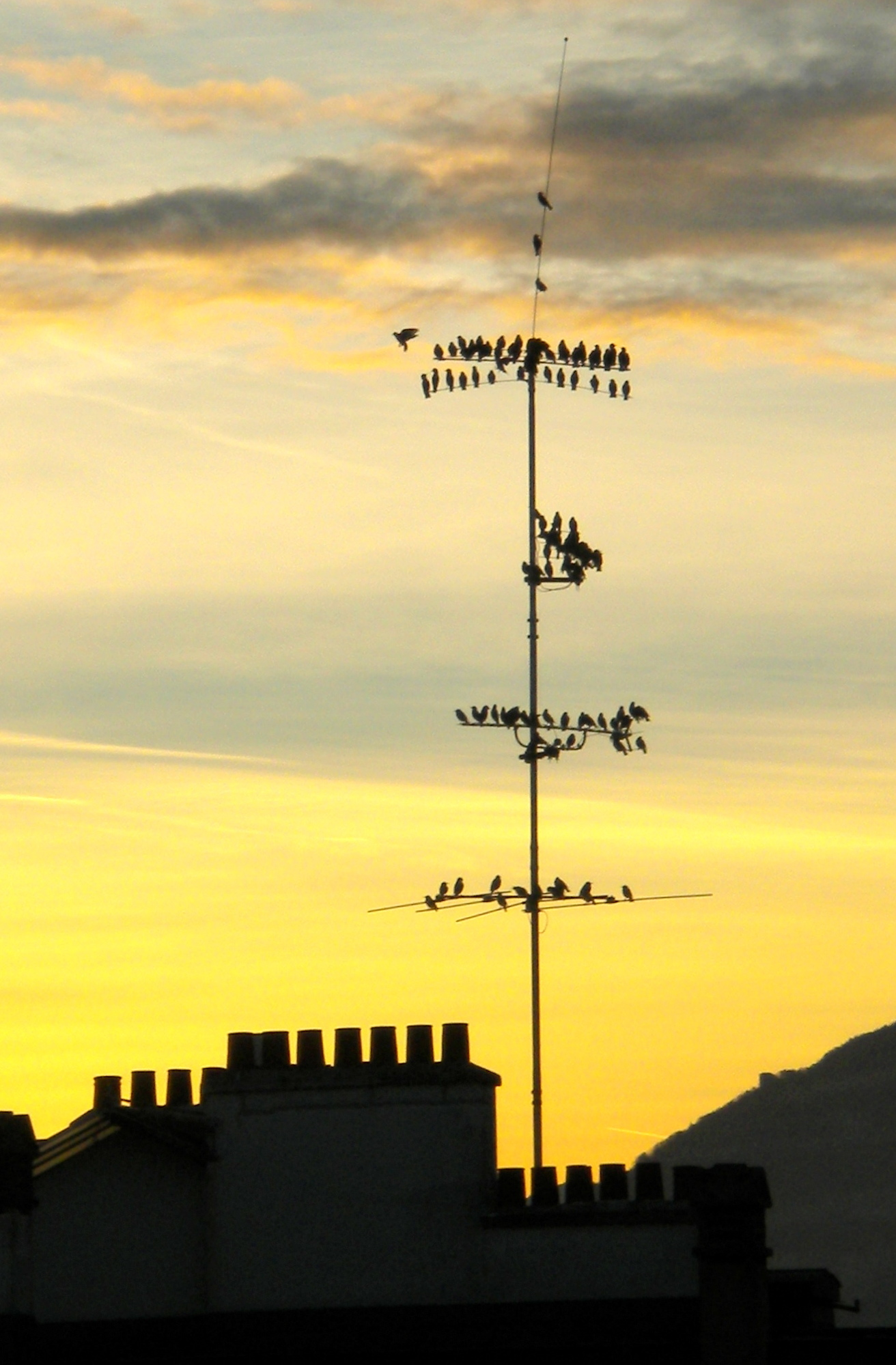
Flocks of birds assembling before migration southwards

Approximately 1,800 of the world's 10,000 bird species migrate long distances each year in response to the seasons. Many of these migrations are north-south, with species feeding and breeding in high northern latitudes in the summer and moving some hundreds of kilometres south for the winter. Some species extend this strategy to migrate annually between the Northern and Southern Hemispheres. The Arctic tern has the longest migration journey of any bird: it flies from its Arctic breeding grounds to the Antarctic and back again each year, a distance of at least 19,000 km (12,000 mi), giving it two summers every year.

Bird migration is controlled primarily by day length, signalled by hormonal changes in the bird's body. On migration, birds navigate using multiple senses. Many birds use a sun compass, requiring them to compensate for the sun's changing position with time of day. Navigation involves the ability to detect magnetic fields.

=== In fish ===
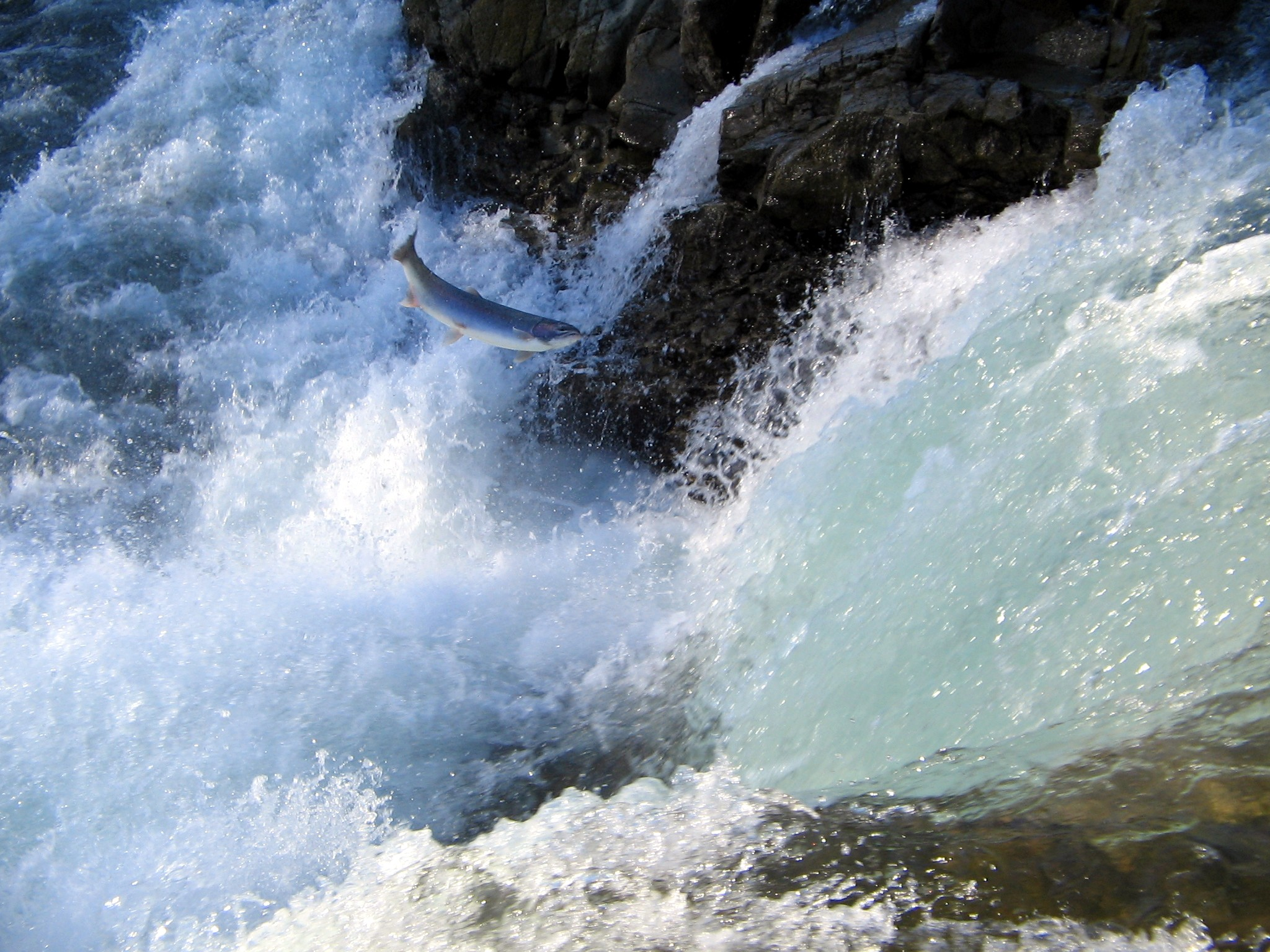
Many species of salmon migrate up rivers to spawn

Most fish species are relatively limited in their movements, remaining in a single geographical area and making short migrations to overwinter, to spawn, or to feed. A few hundred species migrate long distances, in some cases of thousands of kilometres. About 120 species of fish, including several species of salmon, migrate between saltwater and freshwater (they are 'diadromous').

Forage fish such as herring and capelin migrate around substantial parts of the North Atlantic ocean. The capelin, for example, spawn around the southern and western coasts of Iceland; their larvae drift clockwise around Iceland, while the fish swim northwards towards Jan Mayen island to feed and return to Iceland parallel with Greenland's east coast.

In the 'sardine run', billions of Southern African pilchard Sardinops sagax spawn in the cold waters of the Agulhas Bank and move northward along the east coast of South Africa between May and July.

=== In insects ===
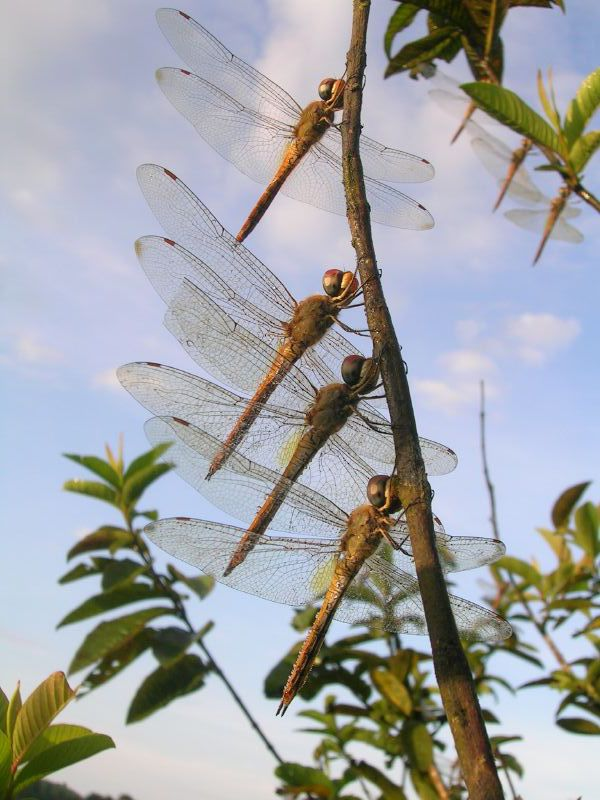
An aggregation of migratory Pantala flavescens dragonflies, known as globe skimmers, in Coorg, India

Some winged insects such as locusts and certain butterflies and dragonflies with strong flight migrate long distances. Among the dragonflies, species of Libellula and Sympetrum are known for mass migration, while Pantala flavescens, known as the globe skimmer or wandering glider dragonfly, makes the longest ocean crossing of any insect: between India and Africa. Exceptionally, swarms of the desert locust, Schistocerca gregaria, flew westwards across the Atlantic Ocean for 4,500 kilometres (2,800 mi) during October 1988, using air currents in the Inter-Tropical Convergence Zone.

In some migratory butterflies, such as the monarch butterfly and the painted lady, no individual completes the whole migration. Instead, the butterflies mate and reproduce on the journey, and successive generations continue the migration.

=== In mammals ===
Some mammals undertake exceptional migrations; reindeer have one of the longest terrestrial migrations on the planet, reaching as much as 4,868 kilometres (3,025 mi) per year in North America. However, over the course of a year, grey wolves move the most. One grey wolf covered a total cumulative annual distance of 7,247 kilometres (4,503 mi).

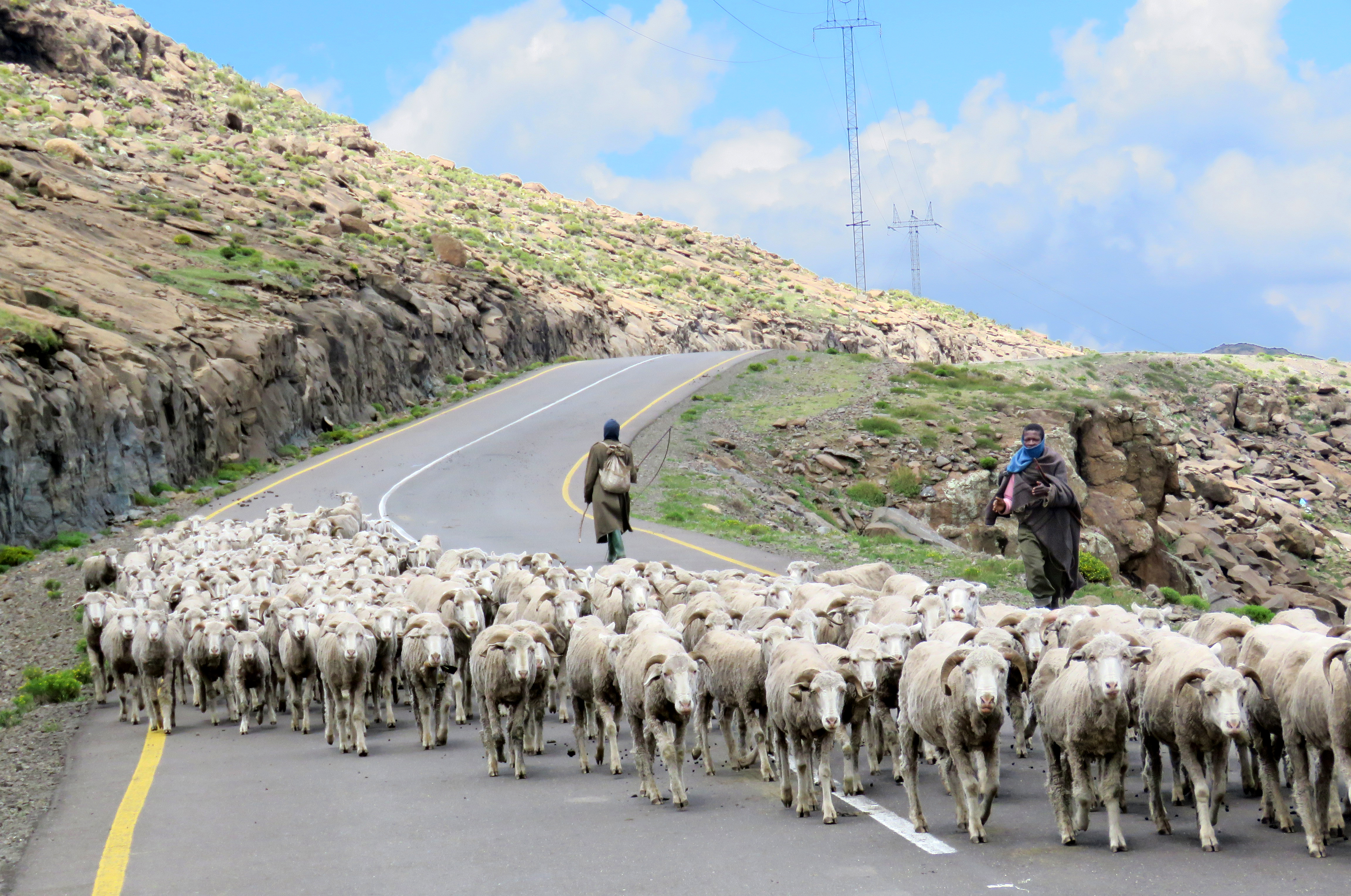
High-mountain shepherds in Lesotho practice transhumance with their flocks.

Mass migration occurs in mammals such as the Serengeti 'great migration', an annual circular pattern of movement with some 1.7 million wildebeest and hundreds of thousands of other large game animals, including gazelles and zebra. More than 20 such species engage, or used to engage, in mass migrations. Of these migrations, those of the springbok, black wildebeest, blesbok, scimitar-horned oryx, and kulan have ceased. Long-distance migrations occur in some bats, such as the mass migration of the Mexican free-tailed bat between Oregon and southern Mexico. Migration is important in cetaceans, including whales, dolphins and porpoises; some species travel long distances between their feeding and their breeding areas.

Humans are mammals, but human migration, as commonly defined, is when individuals often permanently change where they live, which does not fit the patterns described here. An exception is some traditional migratory patterns such as transhumance, in which herders and their animals move seasonally between mountains and valleys, and the seasonal movements of nomads.

=== In other animals ===
Among the reptiles, adult sea turtles migrate long distances to breed, as do some amphibians. Hatchling sea turtles, too, emerge from underground nests, crawl down to the water, and swim offshore to reach the open sea. Juvenile green sea turtles make use of Earth's magnetic field to navigate.

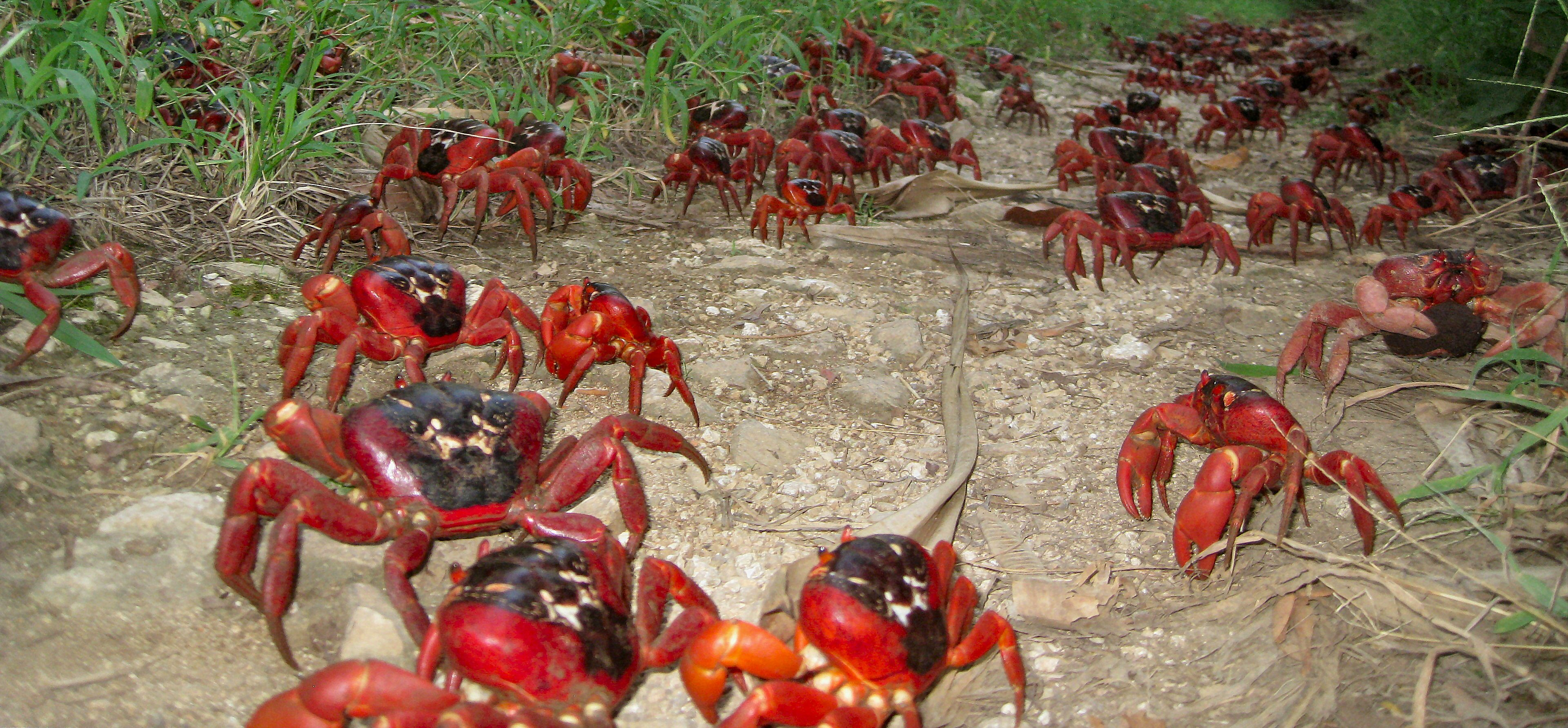
Christmas Island red crabs on annual migration

Some crustaceans migrate, such as the largely-terrestrial Christmas Island red crab, which moves en masse each year by the millions. Like other crabs, they breathe using gills, which must remain wet, so they avoid direct sunlight, digging burrows to shelter from the sun. They mate on land near their burrows. The females incubate their eggs in their abdominal brood pouches for two weeks. Then they return to the sea to release their eggs at high tide in the moon's last quarter. The larvae spend a few weeks at sea and then return to land.

== Tracking migration ==
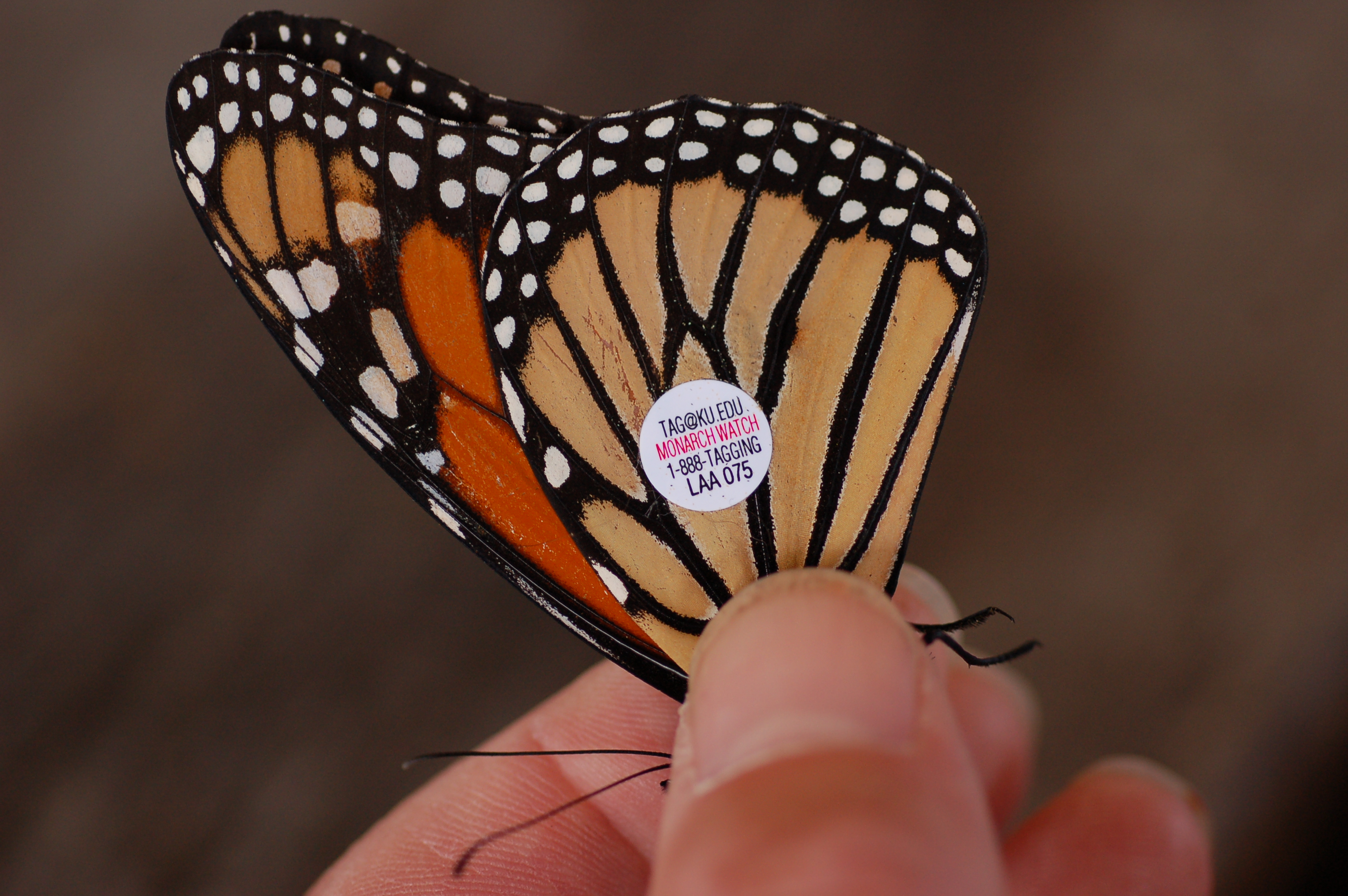
A migratory butterfly, a monarch, tagged for identification

Scientists gather observations of animal migration by tracking their movements. Animals were traditionally tracked with identification tags such as bird rings for later recovery. However, no information was obtained about the actual route followed between release and recovery, and only a fraction of tagged individuals were recovered. More convenient, therefore, are electronic devices such as radio-tracking collars that can be followed by radio, whether handheld, in a vehicle or aircraft, or by satellite. GPS animal tracking enables accurate positions to be broadcast at regular intervals, but the devices are inevitably heavier and more expensive than those without GPS. An alternative is the Argos Doppler tag, also called a 'Platform Transmitter Terminal' (PTT), which sends regularly to the polar-orbiting Argos satellites; using Doppler shift, the animal's location can be estimated, relatively roughly compared to GPS, but at a lower cost and weight. A technology suitable for small birds which cannot carry the heavier devices is the geolocator which logs the light level as the bird flies, for analysis on recapture. There is scope for further development of systems able to track small animals globally. Radio-tracking tags can be fitted to insects, including dragonflies and bees.

== In culture ==
Before animal migration was understood, various folklore and erroneous explanations were formulated to account for the disappearance or sudden arrival of birds in an area. In Ancient Greece, Aristotle proposed that robins turned into redstarts when summer arrived. The barnacle goose was explained in European Medieval bestiaries and manuscripts as either growing like fruit on trees, or developing from goose barnacles on pieces of driftwood. Another example is the swallow, which was once thought, even by naturalists such as Gilbert White, to hibernate either underwater, buried in muddy riverbanks, or in hollow trees.

== See also ==
- Great American Interchange
