= Phosphate Hill Historic Area =

- Location on Christmas Island
- Location on Christmas Island
- 10.4258°S 105.6931°E
- Location: Poon Saan, Christmas Island, Australia

Site notes
- Area: 18 hectares (44 acres)

Commonwealth Heritage List
- Official name: Phosphate Hill Historic Area
- Type: Listed place (Historic)
- Designated: 22 June 2004
- Reference no.: 105297

Phosphate Hill Historic Area is a heritage-listed historic precinct located one kilometre (one mile) east of Poon Saan in the Australian territory of Christmas Island. It was added to the Australian Commonwealth Heritage List on 22 June 2004.

== Description ==
The Phosphate Hill Historic Area is an approximately 18-hectare (44-acre) precinct on the eastern slopes of Phosphate Hill, located one kilometre (one mile) east of the settlement of Poon Saan. It comprises:

1. an area bounded on the north and east by the southern and western sides of the road linking Poon Saan and Headridge Hill and on the western and southern sides by straight lines joining the following points consecutively: the intersection of the southern side of the above road (10°25′40″S 105°41′31″E) and the intersection of the western side of the above road (10°25′39″S 105°41′30″E) and
2. an area bounded on the west by the above road and by straight lines joining the following points consecutively: the intersection of the eastern side of the above road (10°25′29″S 105°41′45″E, 10°25′28″S 105°41′45″E, 10°25′22″S 105°41′50″E, and 10°25′30″S 105°41′52″E) and the intersection of the eastern side of the above road (10°25′32″S 105°41′52″E).

Phosphate Hill was the site of the first phosphate mining on the island. Labourer's barracks and European staff quarters were also constructed on Phosphate Hill. Phosphate Hill was originally mined by hand using wheelbarrow and broom techniques. Oral tradition on the Island has it that labourers (originally Chinese) scraped and brushed the ore into baskets, which were then tipped into wheelbarrows or directly into skip railway hoppers. These hoppers were then moved along the lines by hand. There are remnants of this skip railway system on the hill in the form of embankments and a light gauge railway line along which the hoppers were moved. The ore was taken to the edge of the upper terrace to be transported to the bottom terrace at the Cove. Oral tradition suggests the phosphate was packed in drums at the upper level and rolled down the hill to the lower terrace. Remains of an early chute system suggests that this method was soon replaced with a more efficient system in which the loose ore was tipped into a chute at the top and then allowed to run down to the bottom terrace. Shovelling may have been necessary to maintain the flow at places and it seems the sides of the chute had provision for cable operated scoops that dragged the ore downwards. Manual mining techniques resulted in a moonscape of limestone pinnacles as all phosphate was removed from around the limestone pinnacles and there was little soil left to support regrowth. This contrasts with more recently mined areas where machines have left a much more level surface and enough phosphate and soil to allow limited regrowth.

One physical remnant of this early period is the Phosphate Hill cemetery and the marker for the cemetery which is located on the main road. This cemetery contains a large number of headstones including colourful Chinese memorials. In 1901, nearly a third of the population of Christmas Island died from beri beri or dietary deficiencies.

== Condition ==
The Phosphate Hill mining area is abandoned and has not been altered since mining finished. There is moderate to heavy vegetation regrowth, and there has been some weathering and erosion of the limestone pinnacles. There has also been some erosion of the embankments and cuttings of dry-stone walling. Regardless, the mining areas remain quite distinct and discernible.

== Heritage listing ==
Phosphate Hill Historic Area was listed on the Australian Commonwealth Heritage List on 22 June 2004.

The Phosphate Hill area is historically significant as the location of the first commercial mining of phosphate on the Island and the first phase of an industry that was to determine the history of the Island and the development of the Christmas Island community. The current landscape of exposed limestone pinnacles and industrial remains is an uncommon and evocative reminder of the extent and efficiency and methodology of manual mining techniques. The historic burial ground, which contains many of the early labourers who died of beri beri or dietary deficiencies, is a significant reminder of the hardships endured by the early indentured Asian labourers and a reflection of the multi-racial basis for the current community.
