= Bungalow 702 =

Australian heritage-listed house in Drumsite, Christmas Island

- Location within Earth
- Location on Christmas Island

General information
- Status: Completed
- Type: House
- Location: Lam Lok Loh, Drumsite, Christmas Island, Australia
- Coordinates: 10.4319°S 105.6730°E
- Renovated: 1991; 2001

Technical details
- Material: Brick, masonry, timber, asbestos cement sheet

Commonwealth Heritage List
- Official name: Bungalow 702
- Type: Listed place (Historic)
- Designated: 22 June 2004
- Reference no.: 105338

Bungalow 702 is a heritage-listed house at Lam Lok Loh, Drumsite, Christmas Island, Australia. It was added to the Australian Commonwealth Heritage List on 22 June 2004.

== Description ==
> Bungalow 702 is a rendered brick masonry and timber building on rendered masonry piles with prominent concrete caps, set approximately 1.5 metres (4 ft 11 in) above ground level and accessed by concrete steps. The building has a central gable-roofed section with masonry walls, surrounded by a skillion-roofed enclosed verandah of timber framing. The roof cladding is asbestos cement sheet. The servants' quarters are located at the rear of the building, connected by a covered way, and have corrugated asbestos cement roofing, with newer sections in corrugated fibre-cement. The building retains its angled ventilation shutters at the verandah openings. The servants' quarters are of rendered concrete masonry with a gable roof clad in corrugated asbestos cement.

There is a strong oral tradition on Christmas Island that this bungalow was used by the Japanese as a radio station during the Island's occupation in World War II. The bungalow has become a symbol of this phase of the Island's history and is of considerable social significance to the Christmas Island community.

=== Condition ===
The building was damaged by a storm in March 1988, during which sections of the roof were blown off and less serious damage was sustained in other parts of the building. The building was re-roofed in 1991.

The building had since been sold and was in the process of being refurbished in January 2001.

The 2022 Christmas Island Heritage Survey assessed its integrity and authenticity as high, noting that its form, structure and character remained intact.
