= Christmas Island crab migration =

Crab migration that happens on Christmas Island

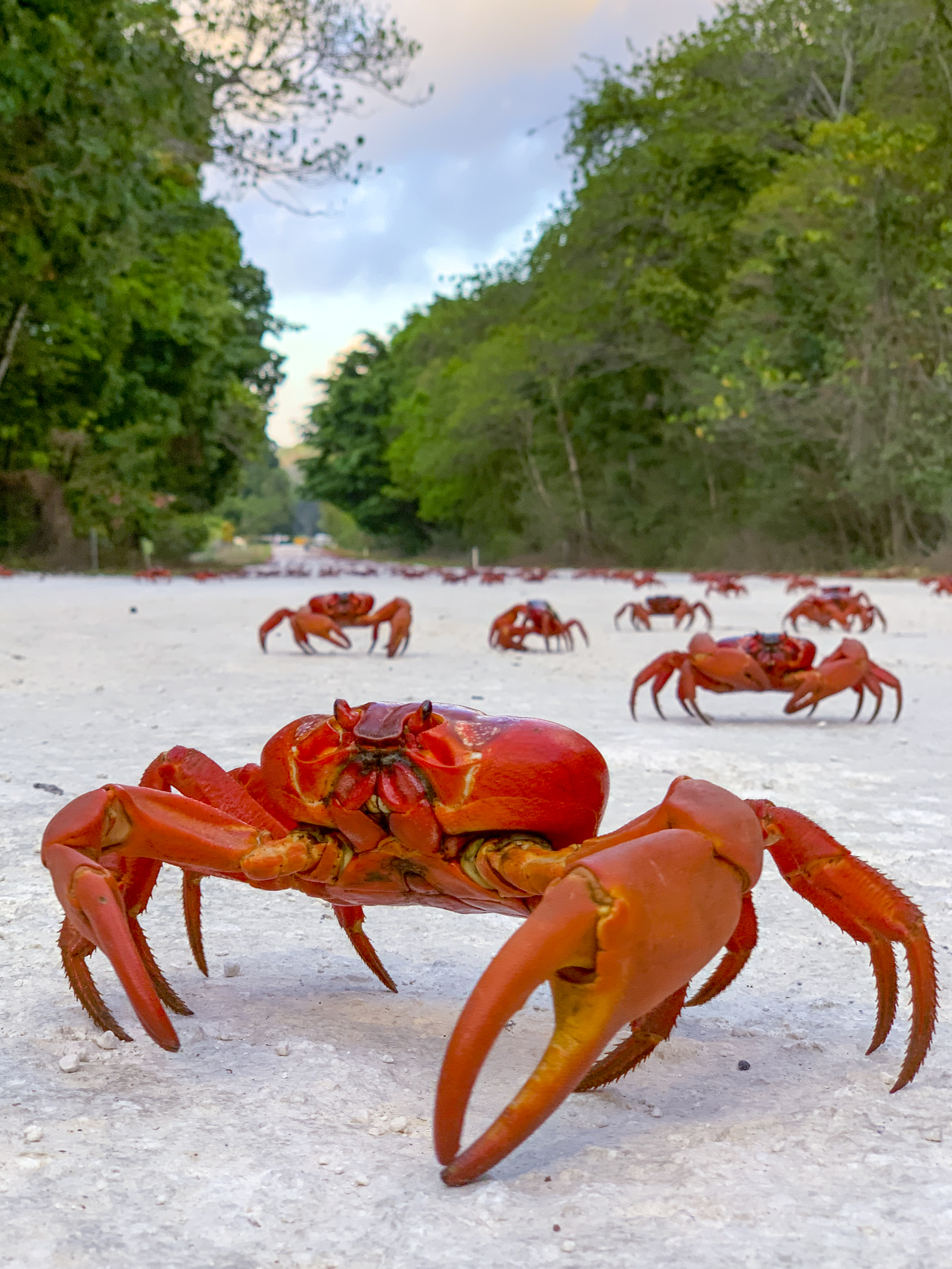
- The migration in Christmas Island National Park
- Nickname: Crab season
- Purpose: Spawning
- Date: October–November to December
- Frequency: Annually
- Locations: Christmas Island, Indian Ocean
- Coordinates: 10°25′18″S 105°40′41″E
- Country: Australia
- Most recent: 18 November 2026
- Previous event: 25 October 2025
- Next event: October or November 2027
- Participants: Christmas Island red crab (Gecarcoidea natalis); 50–100 million

The Christmas Island crab migration is a mass migration of the land crab, Gecarcoidea natalis. It occurs each year on Christmas Island at the beginning of monsoon season around October to November. About 50 to 100 million red crabs slowly travel over the course of days to the coast of the Indian Ocean, walking upwards of 12 hours a day. The crabs breed on the coast, then return inland in December.

The migration is plagued by wildlife–vehicle collisions when the crabs cross roadways; wildlife crossings have helped mitigate the issue. Yellow crazy ants, an invasive species, also target the red crabs during the migration.

== Context: animal migration ==
=== Other animals ===
Many animals migrate annually, including crustaceans, birds, insects, mammals, fish, and reptiles. Some travel long distances to mate and return. Many species of birds migrate every year to stay in a warm season, avoiding winter seasons. Migratory insects include the Asian giant honey bee, Coccinellidae (ladybirds), and some moths. Insects may migrate ether to escape the summer heat or to reach temporary breeding grounds during the warm seasons. Migratory vertebrates include the great white shark, reindeer, wildebeest, and marine turtles. Crustaceans like the Christmas Island red crab, the Christmas Island blue crab, the coconut crab, and the Australian mud crab migrate during a wet season, as do insects like dragonflies. Most insects migrate warm seasons. Mammals like zebras, Australian flying foxes, and fruit bats migrate during a wet season. Fish like catfish, eel, and barramundi migrate during a wet season.

=== Crabs ===
Other crustaceans like the Christmas Island blue crab (Tuerkayana celeste (Note: formerly the Discoplax celeste)) have a similar migration when they go on occasional journeys to the Indian Ocean to breed their own eggs. These species are often less known to the general public since they live closer to the Indian Ocean then the Christmas Island red crab species and they migrate in January or February.

The Coconut crab (Note: also known as the Robber crab) also does a similar migration but only the female crabs go to the Indian Ocean to breed while the male coconut crabs stay in their rainforest home. The female coconut crabs have a risk of drowning since they cannot swim unlike the red crab species or the blue crab species.

Other migratory crabs

Christmas Island blue crab

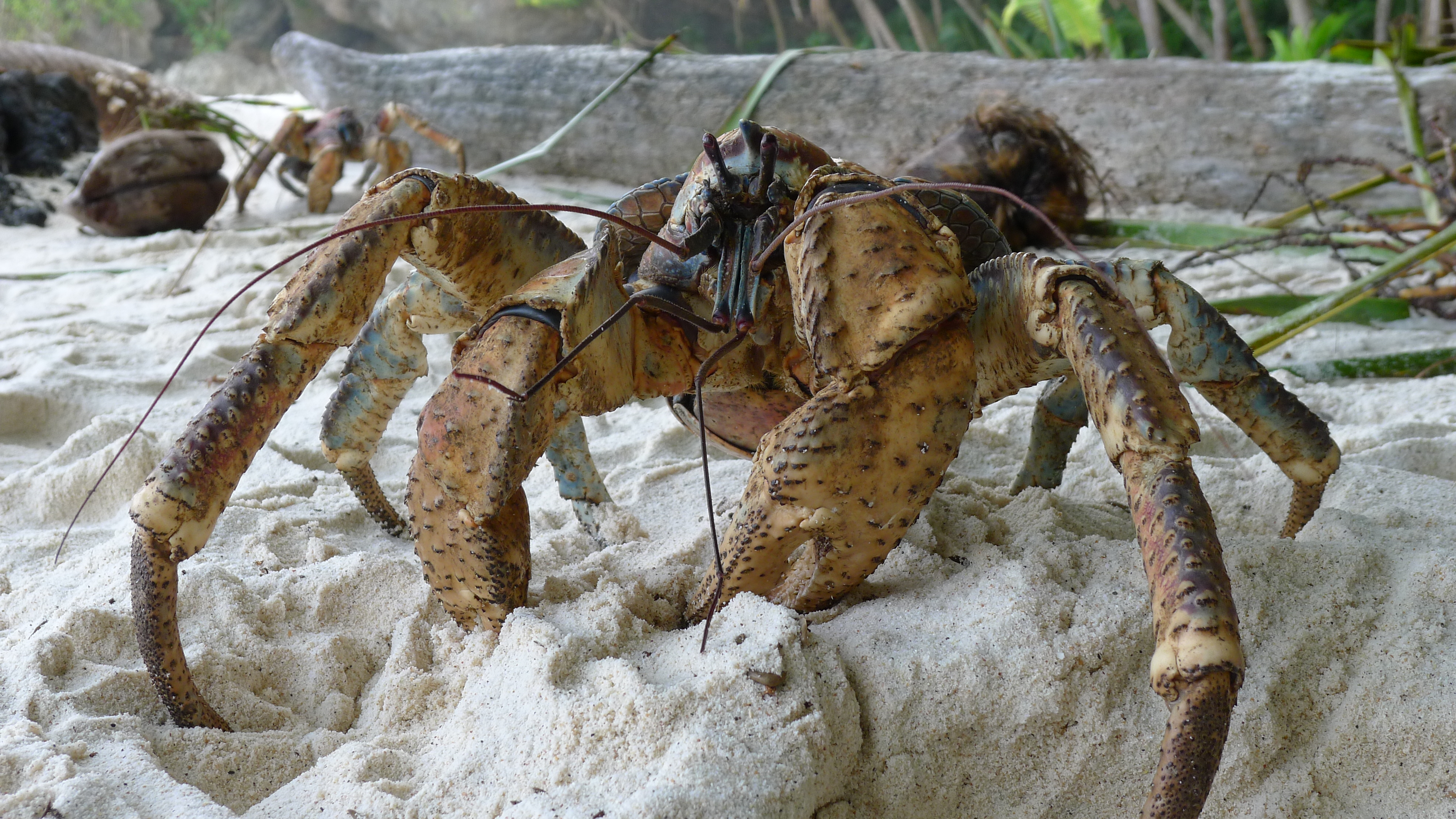
Coconut crab

== Description ==
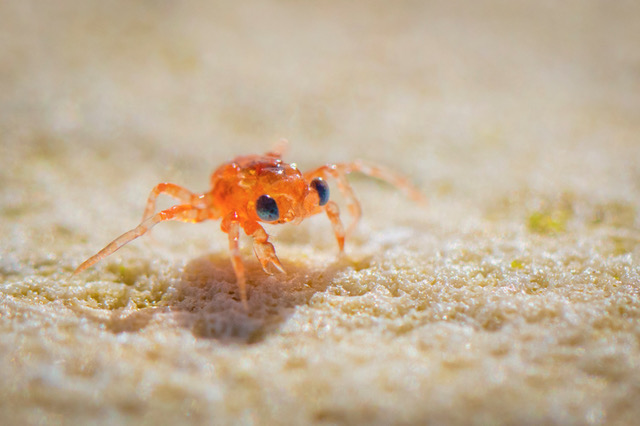
Christmas Island red crab megalopae

The red crab migration season usually starts in October or November when rainfall commonly happens with about 50 to 100 million red crabs that come to the Indian Ocean to breed. The male crabs lead the multi-day trek out of the central forest, followed by female crabs, which the crabs time precisely for night on a receding high tide during the last quarter moon. The female crabs join the male crabs to mate and spend about two weeks incubating eggs each inside moist burrows, then the larvae drift in the ocean before developing into baby crabs that march back inland weeks later. When migration season ends which is around December, the red crabs return into the bush and wait for next year's rainfall to happen.

After the male red crab species finsh mating in coastal burrows, immediately the male crabs go into the ocean to replenish lost moisture and salts. Once rehydrated, they turn around and begin marching back up to the central rainforest, they rely on instinct, moisture and man-made bridges, and open-ended grid tunnels which they follow to their home. The female red crab species stay behind in moist shoreline burrows for 12 to 13 days while their eggs develop. Once they release their eggs into the sea at the turn of the high tide, they immediately begin their own trek back into the forest, relying on instinct, moisture and man-made bridges, and open-ended grid tunnels, just like the males. After the megalopaes hatch in the ocean, the larvae spend about four weeks growing at sea before washing ashore as tiny, translucent juvenile crabs. They then march on Christmas Island together in massive waves to join the adults in the rainforest. The megalopaes do the same thing, relying on instinct, moisture, man-made bridges, and open-ended grid tunnels.

Since there are Christmas Island red crabs in Cocos (Keeling) Islands, they do the exact same migration but there is not many of the red crabs due to the low population of the crabs in Cocos (Keeling) Islands.

== Migration biology ==
During migration season, the red crab species dramatically do internal changes in metabolism, fluid balance and reproductive anatomy to survive a rough overland journey and breeding on beaches.

The female red crab species can produce 100,000 eggs into a abdominal pouch. The eggs hatch into shrimp-like ocean-going larvae before turning into 5 millimetre megalopae. These eventually go into their forest home where the megalopae grow into adult crabs. Climate change has effected seasonal rainfall throughout the years and has caused endocrine and behavioural switches to migrate endocrine and dry El Niño years has caused halt reproduction. In 2023 and 2024, an unusual dry season delayed the red crab migration for about two months due to the dry El Niño season.

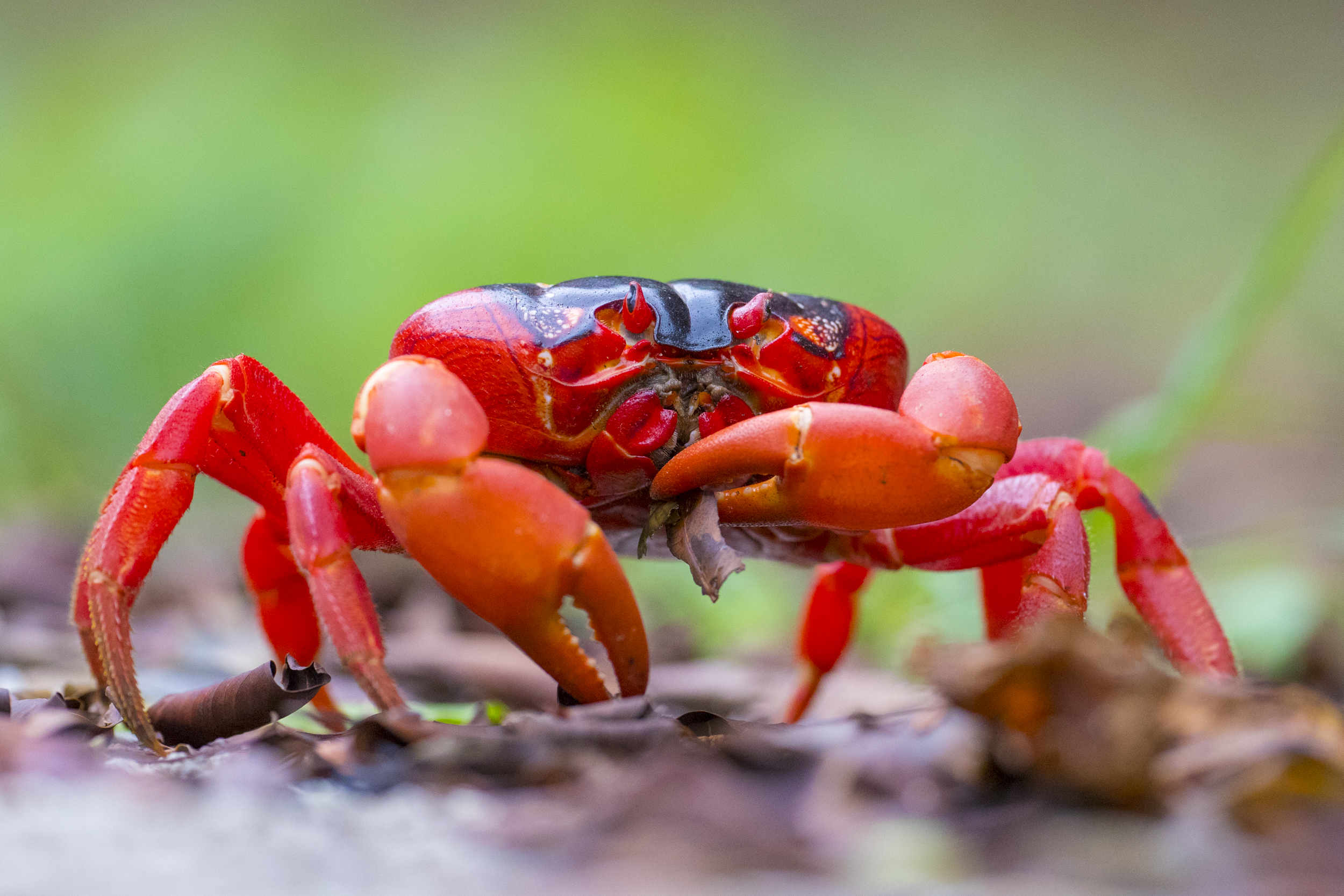
Christmas Island red crab eating dry leaf litter

Red crabs need to sustain walking for up to 12 hours a day. They walk at a slow, steady pace which allows their lungs and gills to keep oxygen levels fully saturated, avoiding the exhaustion caused by fast bursts of movement. The red crabs usually eat dry leaf litter, fruits, flowers, seeds, seedlings, carrion, birds, (Note: typically when they are dead but they sometimes try to eat them alive) Giant African snails, and other red crabs, (Note: typically cannibalising the crabs when they are dead but cannibalize the red crab megalopae) but when migration season comes, they eat the same thing but their feeding behaviour shifts to accommodate the long journey and reproductive demands. During the migration, some of the red crabs cannibalize the red crab megalopae because adult red crabs cannot tell the difference between their own offspring and other small insects or food items.

The red crab species have strength to migrate due to rapid seasonal muscle remodeling, precision hormone rationing and energy-saving pacing. The red crabs leg muscles are used for 10 minute sprints during the dry seasons, but when rainfall starts the migration season, gene expression shifts their muscle fibres from fast-fatiguing to fatigue resistant endurance fibres, allowing them to walk up to 12 hours a day. They do not train for the migration to walk many kilometres to the Indian Ocean to breed and the species do not bulk eat beforehand and will only eat dry leaf litter and they rarely go out of their homes before the migration season.

The red crabs do hormonal control in which their CHH converts stored muscle glycogen into glucose for fuel walking which the crabs switches on a glucose-sensitive negative-feedback loop, when they have high blood sugar, CHH release stops. This prevents them from using their limited glycogen reserves too early before the migration season even begins. This CHH degrades in the crab's circulatory fluid within just a few minutes, so it released in rapid pulses tied directly to daytime walking activity and rising lactate levels.

In 2001, researchers used radio-tracking and mark-recapture methods to map island-wide movement. Crabs walk in straight lines toward the coast at an average speed of 330 to 680 meters per day.

A 2013 study by Princeton University and University of Washington, they analyzed 36 years of migration records, alongside with weather data. The researchers found that the red crab species generally require at least 22 millimeters of rainfall within a specific pre-spawning window to begin their migration season.

== Threats ==
=== Yellow crazy ants ===
Yellow crazy ants are a major threat to migrating red crabs

Invasive yellow crazy ants (Anoplolepis gracilipes) pose a major threat to migrating red crabs on Christmas Island. Yellow crazy ants were accidently introduced to Christmas Island between 1915 to 1934 by cargo ships. Forming dense supercolonies across the rainforest floor, the ants swarm over crabs along their migration routes and spray formic acid to blind and immobilise them, killing tens of millions of crabs since the 1990s. To protect the migration, Parks Australia introduced a biological control programme using a parasitic wasp to reduce the ants' food supply, which has helped crab populations to recover.

=== Humans ===
Humans pose a major threat to the Christmas Island red crabs during migration season. This is mostly due to people driving in vehicles and accidentally running over them and killing them. A crab bridge and open-ended grid tunnels were installed to mitigate this threat.

Picking up a red crab poses a threat to that animal because if moved away from the migration, it may embark in the wrong direction unintentionally. Picking up red crabs is illegal as they are protected by the Christmas Island National Park.

== Mitigating the human threat ==
An open-ended grid tunnel made for the crabs when migration season comes

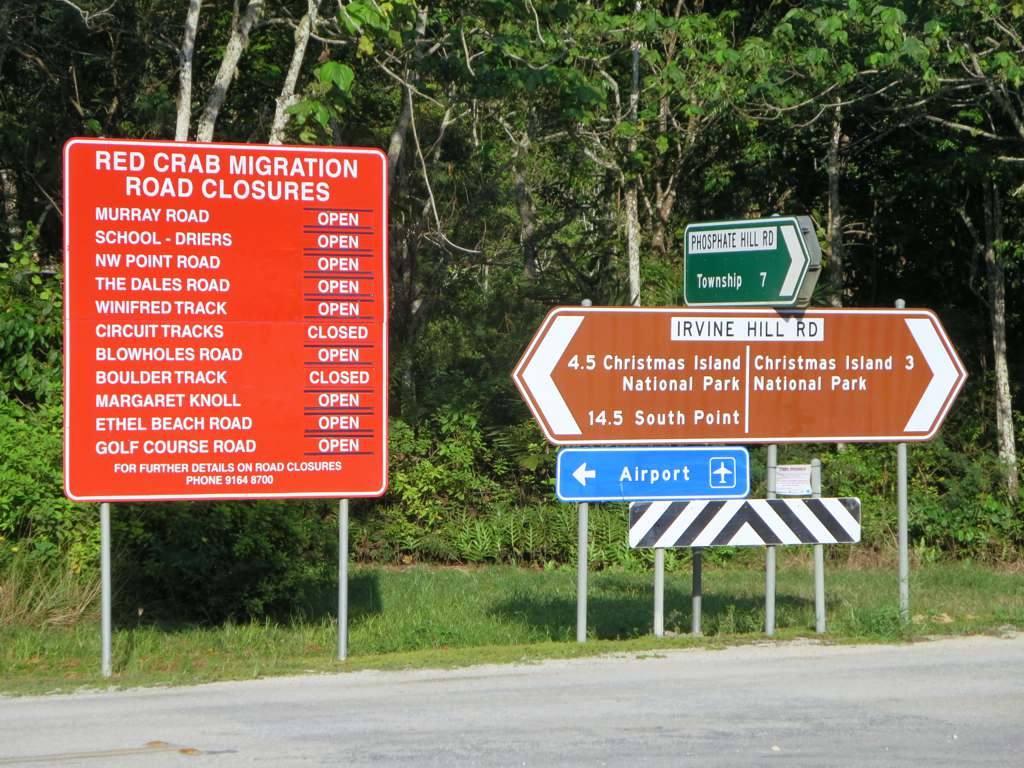
A red sign showing drivers what road is closed when it is covered by crabs

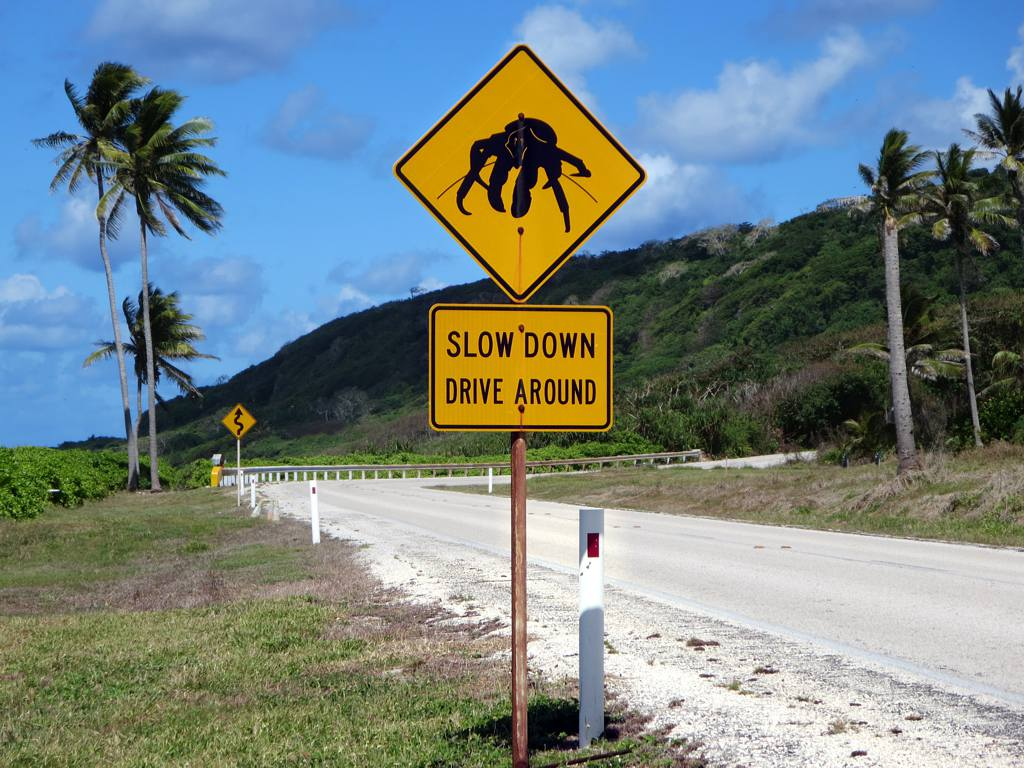
Road signs like these are commonly seen all over Christmas Island

During migration season, the red crabs often cross roads, which creates problems due to road closures and crabs being run over by vehicles which results them being crushed to death. In 2015, a five-metre-high bridge was built, specially made for the red crab migration season, near Drumsite. The crab bridge has small open grids that the red crabs can climb by inserting their legs and claws. Open-ended grid tunnels were also installed under the road, making a pathway for the crabs. There are multiple plastic barriers that are erected into the ground which prevents the red crabs from going onto a busy road which protects them from being crushed by a vehicle. Sometimes the Christmas Island National Park places temporary plastic barriers which are nailed into the ground so the barrier doesn't fall down. Many permanent or temporary road signs are also erected telling road users that crabs can be in that specific location on the road.

Local school students, other residents and people who work for the Christmas Island National Park have helped to prevent the red crabs from getting run over by vehicles during migration season by using rakes and leaf blowers to move the crabs off roadways.

Sweepers attached near the wheels of a vehicle, that protect the crabs by pushing them away from the tires, have been prototyped.

== In popular culture ==
In December 2017, Google partnered with Parks Australia to document the migration for Google Street View. The Google Street View Trekker captured thousands or millions of red crabs on Christmas Island. Google Street View went to various locations and areas of Christmas Island, including Ethel Beach, and Ethel Beach Boat Ramp, where Google Street View captured imagery of the crabs, and the photographers. Google Street View also captured the red crab species on Merrial Beach with the Trekker backpack, even the people who were following the Trekker camera.
