= Poon Saan =

Human settlement in Christmas Island, Australia

Poon Saan 半山 (Chinese)
- Town
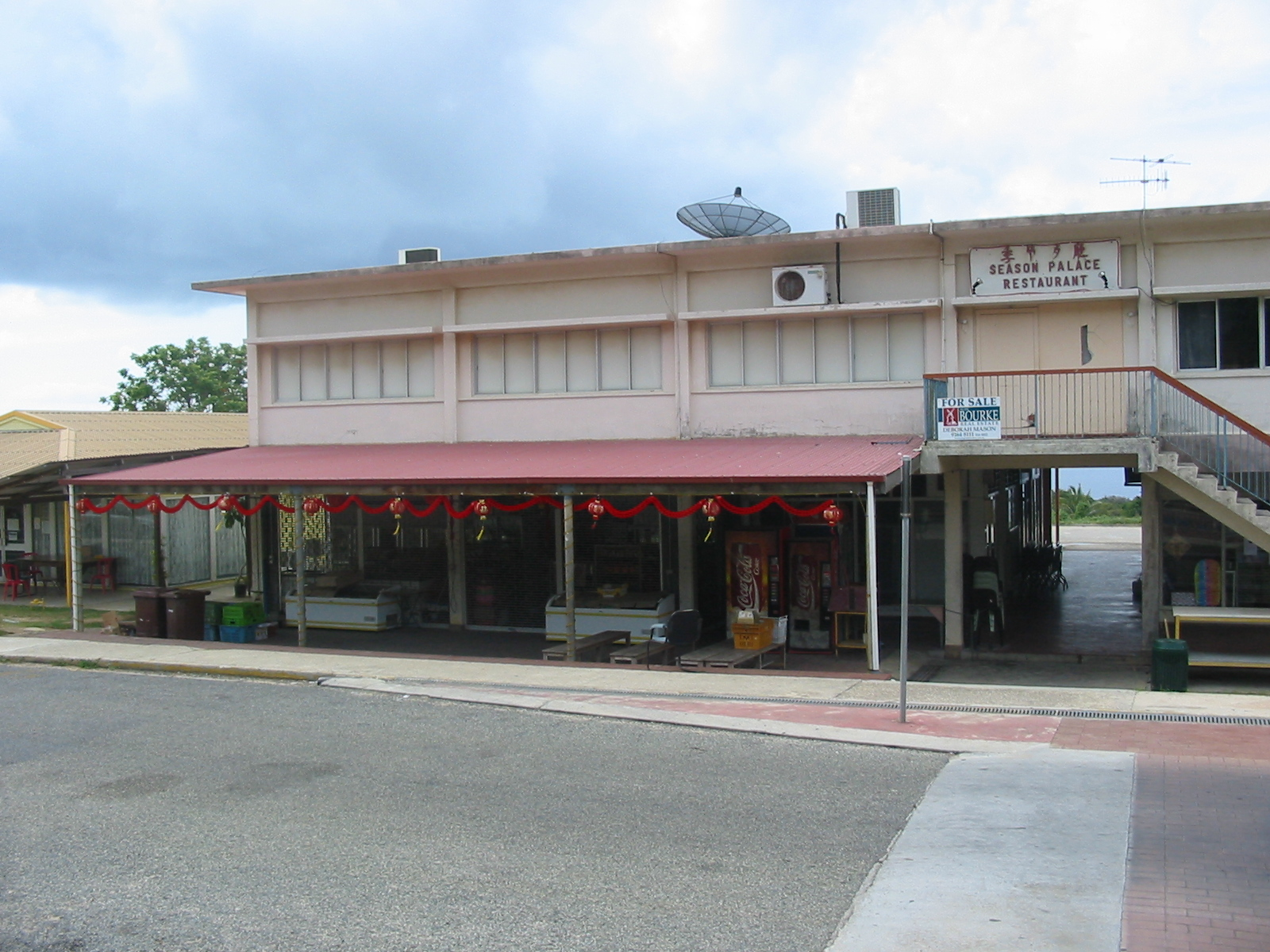
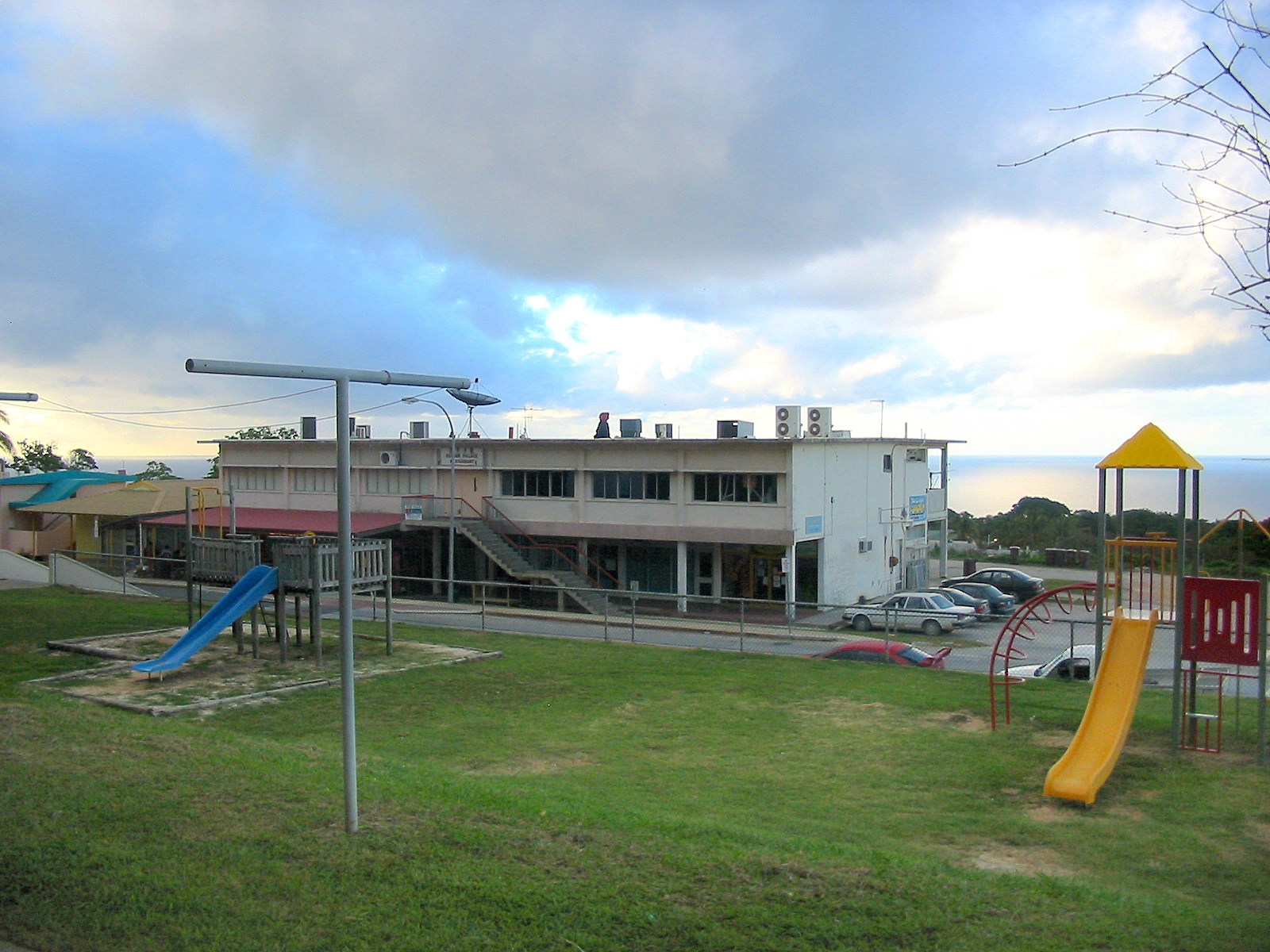
- Shops in Poon Saan Poon Saan in the evening

- Coordinates: 10°25′21″S 105°40′56″E
- Country: Australia
- State: Australia
- LGA: Shire of Christmas Island
- Location: 1.4 km (0.87 mi) northeast of Drumsite; 3.1 km (1.9 mi) east of Flying Fish Cove

Government
  - Federal division: Lingiari
- Time zone: UTC+07:00 (ICT)
- Postcode: 6798
Localities around Poon Saan
Flying Fish Cove	Pacific Ocean	Pacific Ocean
Flying Fish Cove	Poon Saan	Pacific Ocean
Drumsite	Drumsite	Pacific Ocean

Poon Saan
- Simplified Chinese: 半山
- Traditional Chinese: 半山
Transcriptions
Standard Mandarin
- Hanyu Pinyin: Bànshān
Yue: Cantonese
- Jyutping: bun^{3} saan^{1}

Poon Saan is the second largest village on Christmas Island, an external territory of Australia. Ethnic Chinese make up the majority of inhabitants. In Cantonese, Poon Saan (半山, Jyutping: bun3 saan1) means "halfway up the hill". The architecture of Poon Saan reflects the Chinese heritage of the majority of residents in being Singapore style units, rather than the Western style common in Flying Fish Cove.

The Java sparrow has become established on the island with populations near Poon Saan.

== Heritage ==
An area of the settlement, including the Poon Saan Club, Union of Christmas Island Workers office, cinema and several residential blocks, is listed on the Australian Commonwealth Heritage List as the "Poon Saan Group" for its "significance to the Chinese population", "architectural styles imported from Singapore and rarely found in other parts of Australia", and for the "number of structures associated with the inception and development of the union movement on Christmas Island", while the cinema was considered significant for its role as a venue for mass meetings and as "an uncommon example of a relatively intact outdoor cinema". The Phosphate Hill Historic Area, 1 kilometre (0.62 mi) east of the settlement is also listed on the Commonwealth Heritage List.

== Facilities ==
The village plays host to a community centre, used by elderly residents as a gathering space to play mahjong. There is also a cinema, several restaurants and cafes in both Chinese and Western cuisines, and a Chinese supermarket. The settlement is close to the island’s hospital.

== Religion ==
There are seven Buddhist temples and shrines located around Poon Saan, most dating from the 1970s. Buddhist shrines on the island are traditionally painted yellow.

The settlement is also home to a building which belongs to the Baháʼí Faith community. In addition to this, there are two Na Tuk Kong shrines in the village.
