= List of mammals that perform mass migrations =

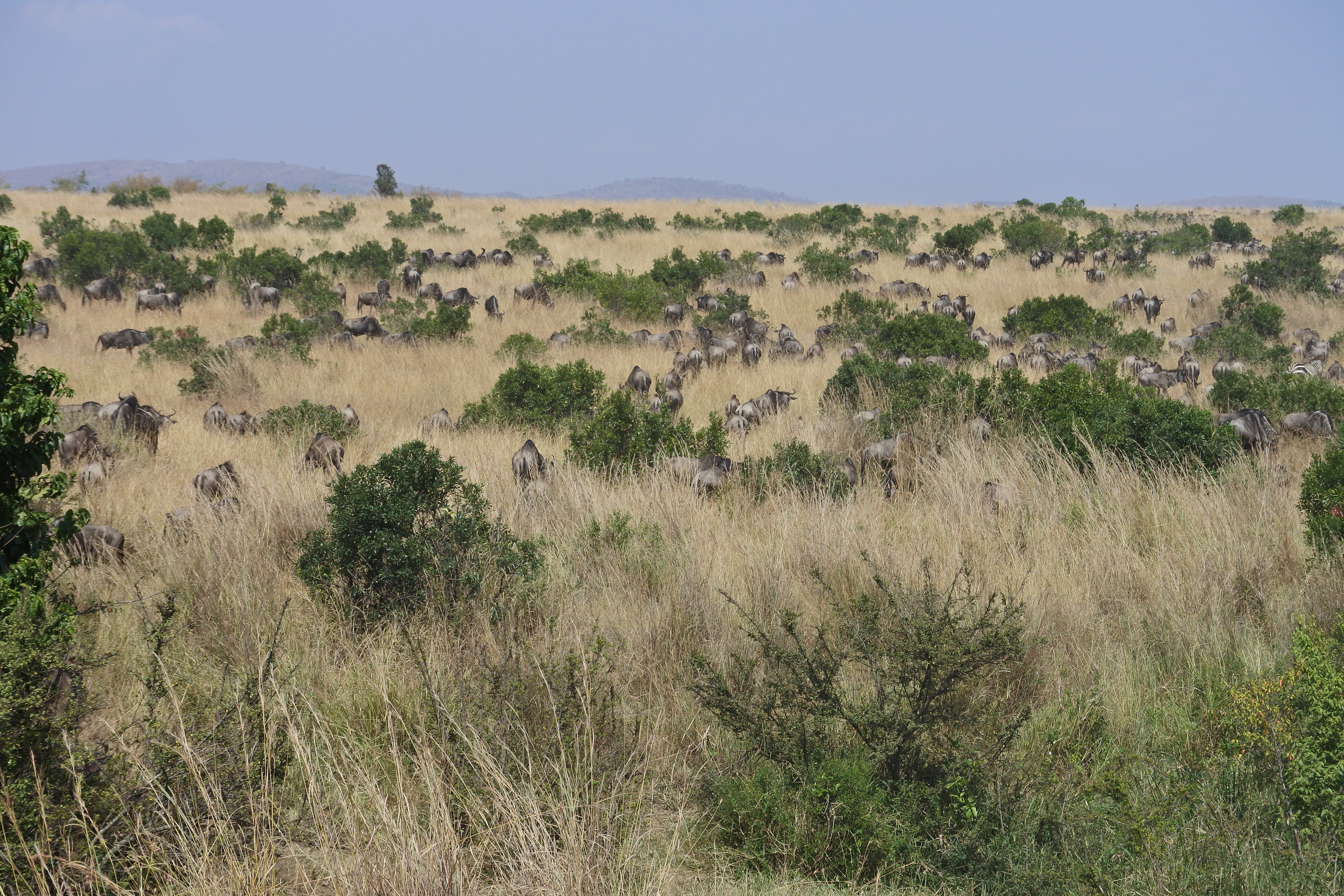
Blue wildebeest on migration in Kenya, 2017

Mass migrations take place, or used to take place, by the following mammals:

Africa:

- Hartebeest
- Springbok
- Black wildebeest
- Blue wildebeest
- Blesbok
- Tiang
- Burchell's zebra
- Quagga (extinct)
- Thompson's gazelle
- Mongalla gazelle
- White-eared kob
- Grant's gazelle
- Scimitar-horned oryx
- Giant eland

North America:

- Pronghorn
- Mule deer
- Bison
- Wapiti
- Mexican free-tailed bat

North America and Eurasia:

- Reindeer/caribou

Eurasia:

- Chiru
- Kulan
- Mongolian gazelle
- Saiga
- Nathusius's pipistrelle
- Common noctule

Of these migrations, those of the springbok, black wildebeest, blesbok, and scimitar-horned oryx have ceased.
