= Sea turtle migration =

Seasonal movement of sea turtles

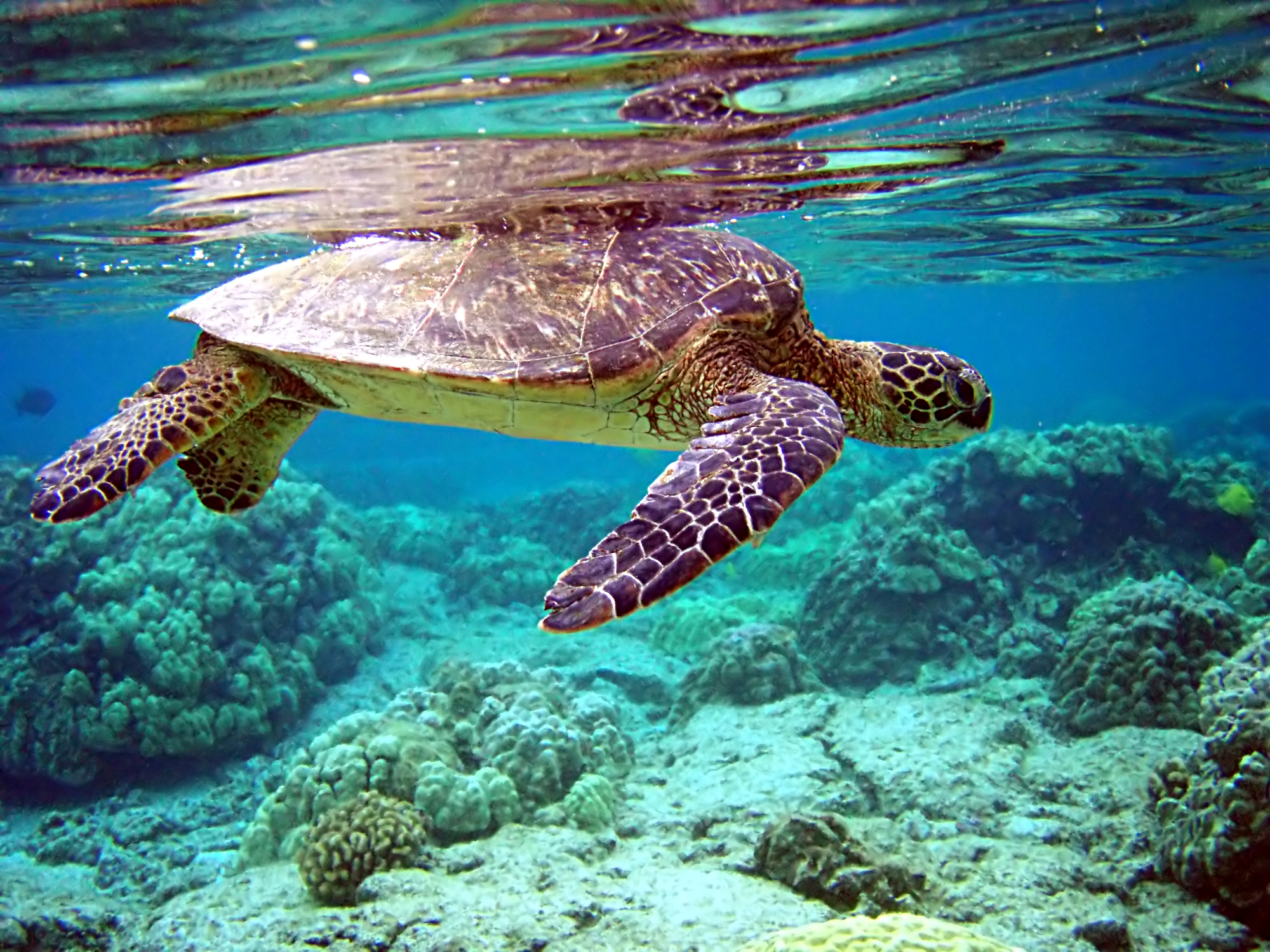
The green sea turtle migrates between its nesting sites and its coastal foraging areas.

Sea turtle migration is the long-distance movement of sea turtles (superfamily Chelonioidea), comprising the swimming of adults to their breeding beaches, and also the offshore migration of hatchings. Sea turtle hatchings emerge from underground nests and crawl across the beach towards the sea. They then head offshore to the open sea. The feeding and nesting sites of adult sea turtles may be far apart, requiring some to migrate hundreds or even thousands of kilometres.

Several patterns of adult migration have been identified. Some green sea turtles shuttle between nesting sites and coastal foraging areas. The loggerhead sea turtle uses a series of foraging sites. Others such as the leatherback sea turtle and olive ridley sea turtle do not keep to one coastal foraging site, but forage in different areas in the open sea. Although the leatherbacks seem to forage randomly, drifting passively with the currents, they still return to specific sites to breed. The ability of adult sea turtles to travel to precise locations has led biologists to wonder about their navigational mechanisms. Some have suggested that turtles might use the Earth's magnetic field to fix their position. There is evidence for this ability in juvenile green sea turtles.

== Physiological and behavioral aspects of migration ==
Sea turtles migrate up to 10,000 miles or more per year, traveling between breeding, foraging, and overwintering sites. Hatchlings migrate to open waters after emerging from their nest. Juvenile and adult sea turtles engage in seasonal migration, likely due to thermal variation and seeking areas with sufficient food. Sea turtles move north during spring and summer to more nutrient rich bodies of water. During fall and winter, they migrate back southward.

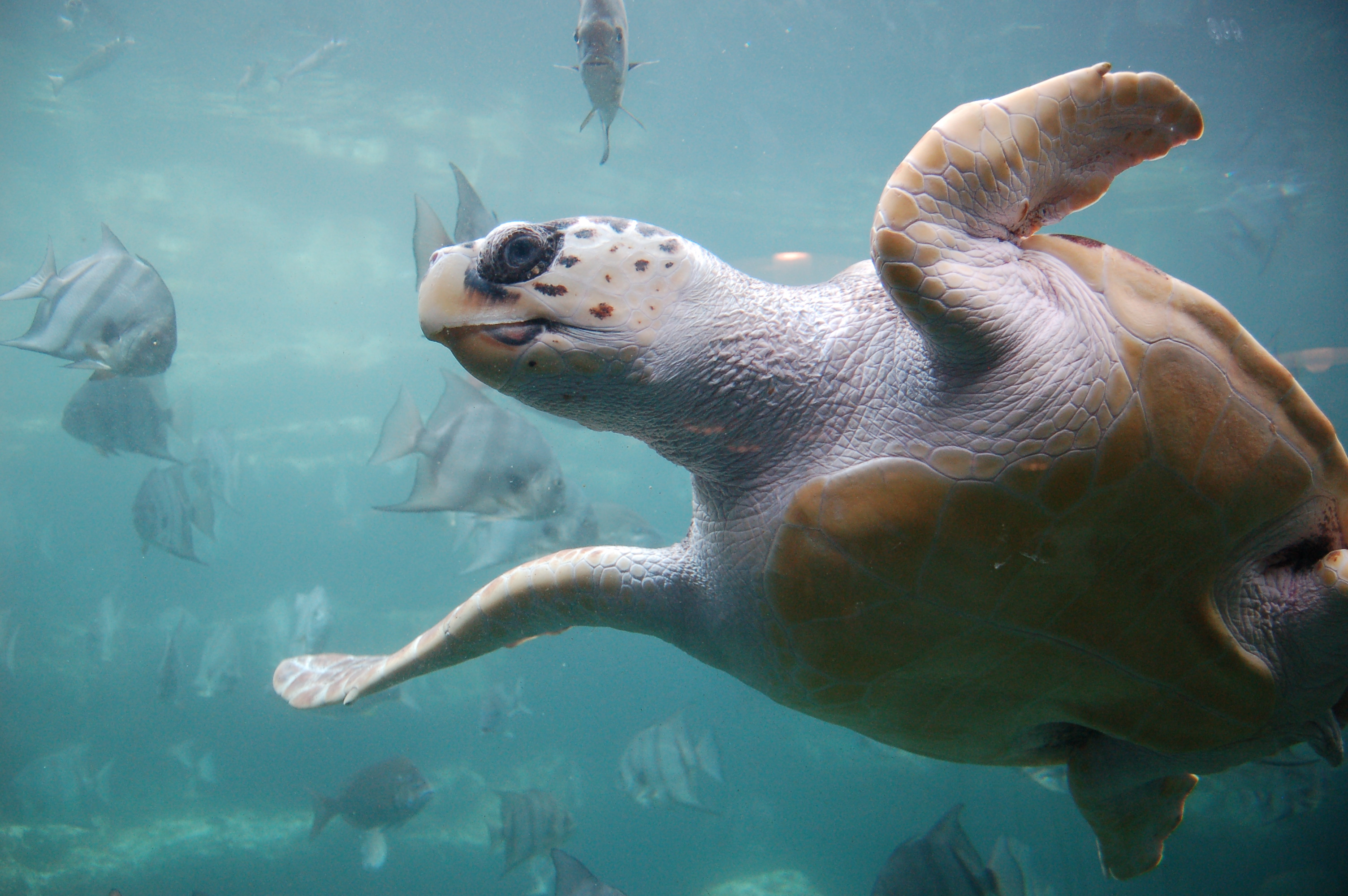
Loggerhead Sea Turtle

Sea turtles are considered ectothermic non-avian reptiles. Therefore, temperature has a major effect on both metabolic and physiological processes. Research has shown that during sea turtle migration, activity levels and VO_{2} within the turtles are higher than in rest. The size of the turtles also affects aerobic metabolism. A previous study indicated that as body size increased, so did the capacity for aerobic activity. The higher capacity for aerobic activity is effective when traveling long distances. The research team concluded that the migrations by sea turtles are helpful in regulating temperature, which increases their overall aerobic activity.

The navigational methods of sea turtle migration help to increase the fitness of the sea turtle. The turtles use these cues to travel into deeper waters for a higher abundance of food and a lower risk of predation. For sea turtles who are endangered, finding an area of lower predation helps to maximize their overall fitness and maintain them as a species. For female sea turtles, returning to their natal beach to lay their offspring has been hypothesized to strengthen resistance to parasitic disease. This increases the fitness of the sea turtle along with its offspring.

== Hatchling migration ==
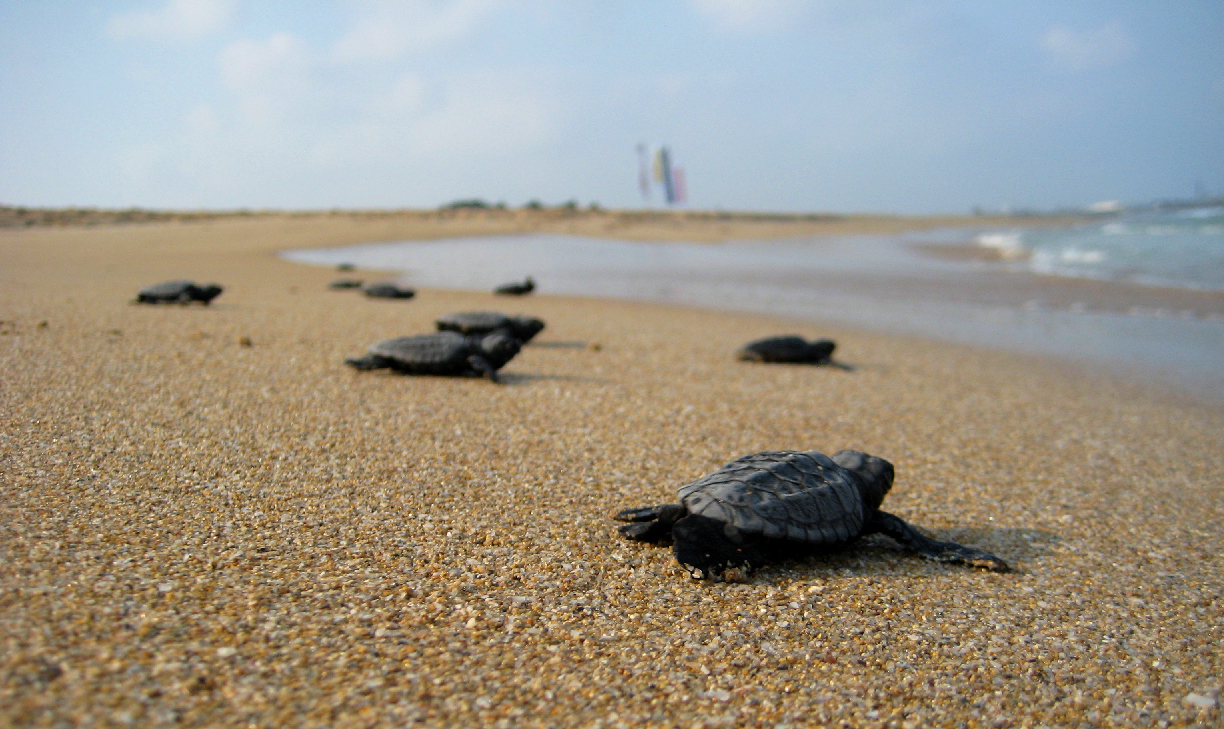
Hatchling Loggerhead Sea Turtles migrating towards the ocean

Efficient movement of hatchlings away from the beach and shallow coastal waters is important in reducing the length of time that they are vulnerable to predators, which target the hatchlings on the beach or in shallow waters. Therefore, sea turtle hatchlings move offshore as an innate behaviour. The first part of the hatchling migration is called the 'frenzy period' which involves almost continuous swimming for the first 24–36 hours.

== Orientation and navigation ==
Studies of loggerhead and leatherback hatchlings have shown that moonlight reflected from the sea is an important visual cue in guiding movement from the beach to the sea. This navigational mechanism becomes a handicap if nesting sites are affected by artificial lighting since this can mean that hatchlings head towards the artificial lights rather than offshore towards the moonlit sea. Hence, the use of moonlight by turtle hatchings as a navigational cue can be considered an 'evolutionary trap'. Loggerhead and green turtles can detect the orbital movement of waves and use this information to swim perpendicular to the waves crests. This means they swim offshore, since close to the shore, wave crests run parallel to the beach. Further offshore the Earth's magnetic field is used to maintain an offshore direction and therefore head towards the open sea.

The ability to head in a given direction without reference to landmarks, is called a compass mechanism and where magnetic cues are used to achieve this it is called a 'magnetic compass'. Hatchling loggerheads mature within the North Atlantic Gyre and it is important that they stay within this current system since here water temperatures are benign. It has been shown that loggerheads use the magnetic field to stay within the gyre. For example, when exposed to fields characteristic of a region at the edge of the gyre they responded by orienting in a direction which would keep them within the gyre. These responses are inherited rather than learned since the hatchlings tested were captured before reaching the ocean. Adult turtles may learn aspects of the magnetic field and use this to navigate in a learned rather than innate way.

== Post-hatchling migration ==
Juveniles often reside in coastal feeding grounds, as with green sea turtles and loggerheads. Adult sea turtles can be divided into 3 categories according to their movements. Leatherbacks and olive ridley turtles roam widely and unpredictably before returning to specific breeding sites. Satellite tracking of leatherbacks showed that they tended to stay within relatively food-rich areas of the ocean during their migration. Kemp's ridley sea turtles, loggerheads and flatback sea turtles migrate between breeding areas and a series of coastal foraging areas. Green sea turtles and hawksbill sea turtles shuttle between fixed foraging and nesting sites. Both species of ridley sea turtle nest in large aggregations, arribadas. This is thought to be an anti-predator adaptation — there are simply too many eggs for the predators to consume. One unifying aspect of sea turtle migrations is their ability to return to specific nesting sites over vast areas of ocean year after year. They may return to the beach where they hatched, an ability called natal philopatry; this has been demonstrated in green turtles using mitochondrial DNA analysis.

The precision migration of adults across featureless and dynamic oceans requires more than a compass mechanism, something Darwin pointed out in 1873: "Even if we grant animals a sense of the points of the compass ... how can we account for [green sea turtles] finding their way to that speck of land in the midst of the great Atlantic Ocean" [of the migration of green sea turtles from the coast of Brazil to Ascension Island, a journey of 2200 km to an island only 20 km in diameter]. An error in heading of only a few degrees would lead a turtle to miss the island by almost 100 km and animal compass analogues are not thought to be this precise. Moreover, a compass mechanism does not correct for current displacement since there is no position-fix.

Some have suggested that turtles use aspects of the Earth's magnetic field to gauge their position and in this way they could correct for displacement by currents or by an experimenter.

=== Green sea turtles ===
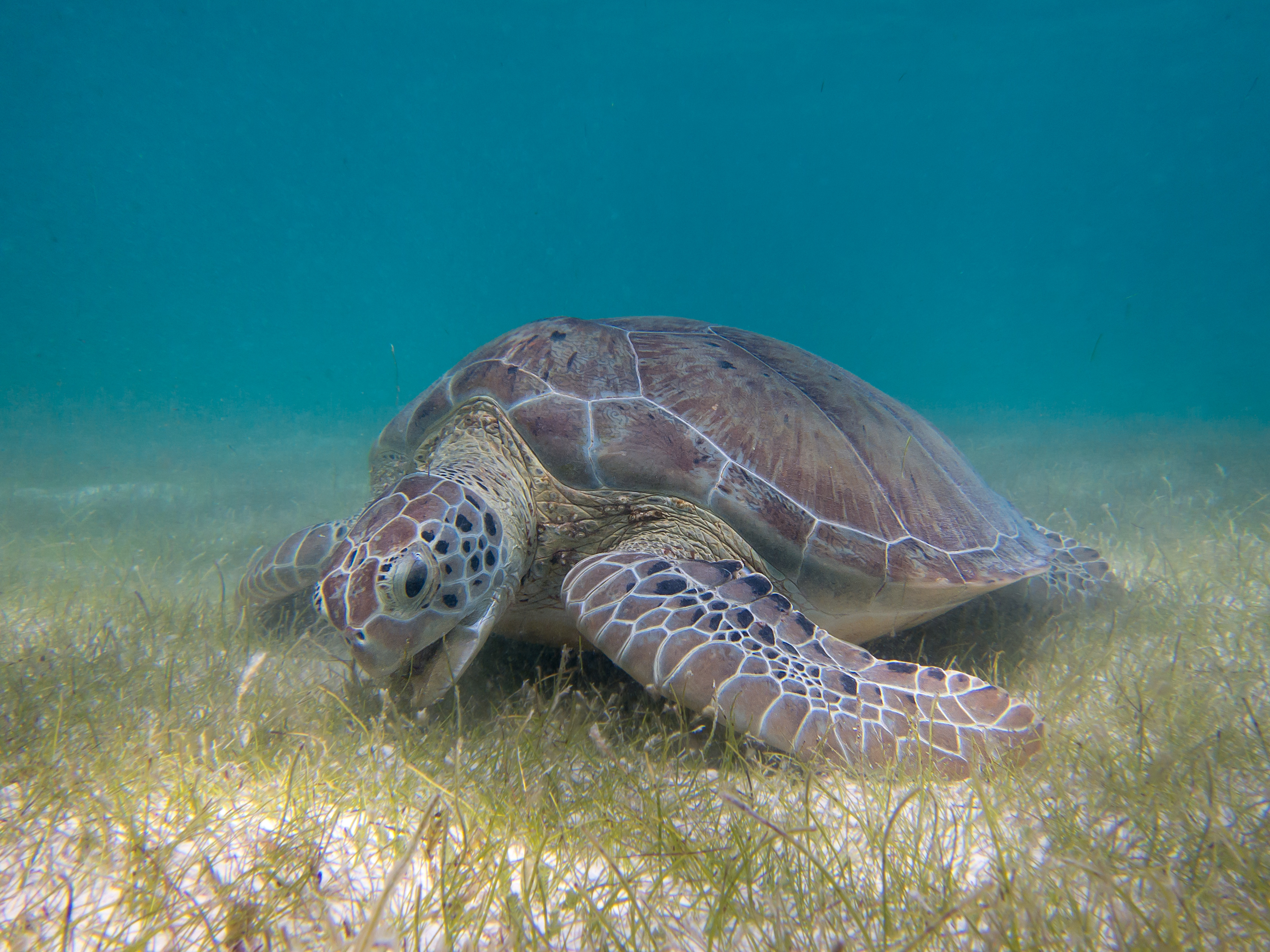
Green Sea Turtle grazing seagrass

The post-nesting migration of adult female green sea turtles from Ascension Island to Brazil has been recorded using satellite transmitters as part of an experiment into their navigation. In addition to the transmitters, some turtles were fitted with magnets which were expected to disrupt any ability to use the Earth's field for navigation. There was no difference in migratory performance between these turtles and turtles which were not carrying magnets, but the experimental design has been criticised. There is strong evidence that green turtles are sensitive to magnetic cues. For example, juvenile green turtles exposed to fields north and south of a capture site (i.e. displaced in geomagnetic but not geographical space) oriented in a direction that would have led them back to the capture site, suggesting that they can use the earth's magnetic field to acquire positional information. Adult turtles also use magnetic cues. Whilst geomagnetic cues may guide navigation over long distances, close to the goal, it is thought that turtles use wind-borne cues emanating from the goal to home in on their target. Juvenile greens can orient using a 'sun compass'. In other words, they can use directional information to determine their headings.

== Navigation methods ==
Turtle navigational skills for migrations remain unknown. There are several hypotheses including astronomical cues and the Earth's magnetic field. There is evidence that sea turtles do use a navigational compass such as bicoordinate mapping or geomagnetic imprinting when making long migrations. The following navigational methods of sea turtle migration help to increase the fitness benefits of the sea turtle. The turtles use these cues to travel into deeper waters for more a higher abundance of food and a lower risk of predation. For sea turtles who are endangered, finding an area of lower predation helps to maximize their overall fitness and keep them as an existent species.

The astronomical cue hypothesis is unsupported by scientific evidence. These cues would include light from the Sun, Moon, and stars. If sea turtles used astronomical cues, they would not be able to navigate in waters where light does not attenuate well, on cloudy days or when the Moon is blocked by clouds. The Moon is not a good astronomical cue because there is a new moon every 28 days. Narrowing out the astronomical hypothesis, the use of Earth's magnetic fields can be viewed as the navigational tool for long-migration patterns of sea turtles.

Earth's magnetic field is used for migration for a wide variety of species including bacteria, mollusks, arthropods, mammals, birds, reptiles, and amphibians. In order to understand the Earth's magnetic fields, the Earth can be viewed as a large magnet. As a typical magnet has a north and south end, so does the Earth. The north pole magnet is located at the Earth's north pole and the south pole magnet is located at the Earth's south pole. From this north and south pole span magnetic fields. The magnetic field leaves the poles and curves around the Earth until it reaches the opposite pole.

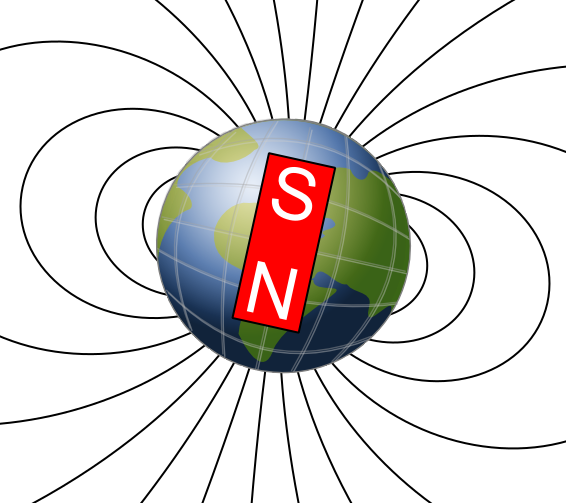
Earths magnetic field schematic

In regards to the magnetic field hypothesis, there are three main concepts. The concepts include electromagnetic induction, magnetic field chemical reactions, and magnetite. In regards to electromagnetic induction, it is assumed that the sea turtles have electroreceptors. Although evidence has been found in other species such as rays and sharks, no evidence has shown that there are electroreceptors in sea turtles making this hypothesis invalid. A second concept from the experimentation by Irwin involves chemical reactions commonly found in newts and birds. The strength of the magnetic field affects the chemical reactions within the bodies of the newts and birds. The final concept includes the magnetic crystals that form during the magnetic pulses from the Earth's magnetic fields. These magnetic crystals formed by magnetite give the turtles directional information and guides in migration. The magnetite affects the cells of the nervous system of the sea turtle by producing a signal that references the forces of the magnetic field and the direction and magnitude that is applied. If this magnetite is used in the migration, when the Earth's magnetic poles reverse at the dipole moment, the signal that the sea turtle nervous system receives will change the migration direction. Regardless of the hypothesis, hatchling turtles have the ability to determine the direction and inclination angle of which they are swimming with aide from magnetic fields.

=== Bicoordinate Mapping ===
Bicoordinate mapping has also been hypothesized as a method of travel for sea turtles along with longitudinal direction. Bicoordinate mapping is defined as a geomagnetic map that depends on both the intensity and inclination of the magnetic field. Changes within the intensity or inclination of the Earth's magnetic field can deter a sea turtles direction of travel, so it is important for geographical coordinates to play a role in open-sea migration. It has been shown that when placed into areas with the same latitudinal but different longitudinal coordinates, sea turtles are able to continue traveling in the same magnetic direction they began in. The conclusion is formed that sea turtles may inherit a bicoordinate map to follow that does not coordinate with specific latitudinal or longitudinal points, but helps for the turtle to maintain a constant direction of travel.

=== Geomagnetic Imprinting ===
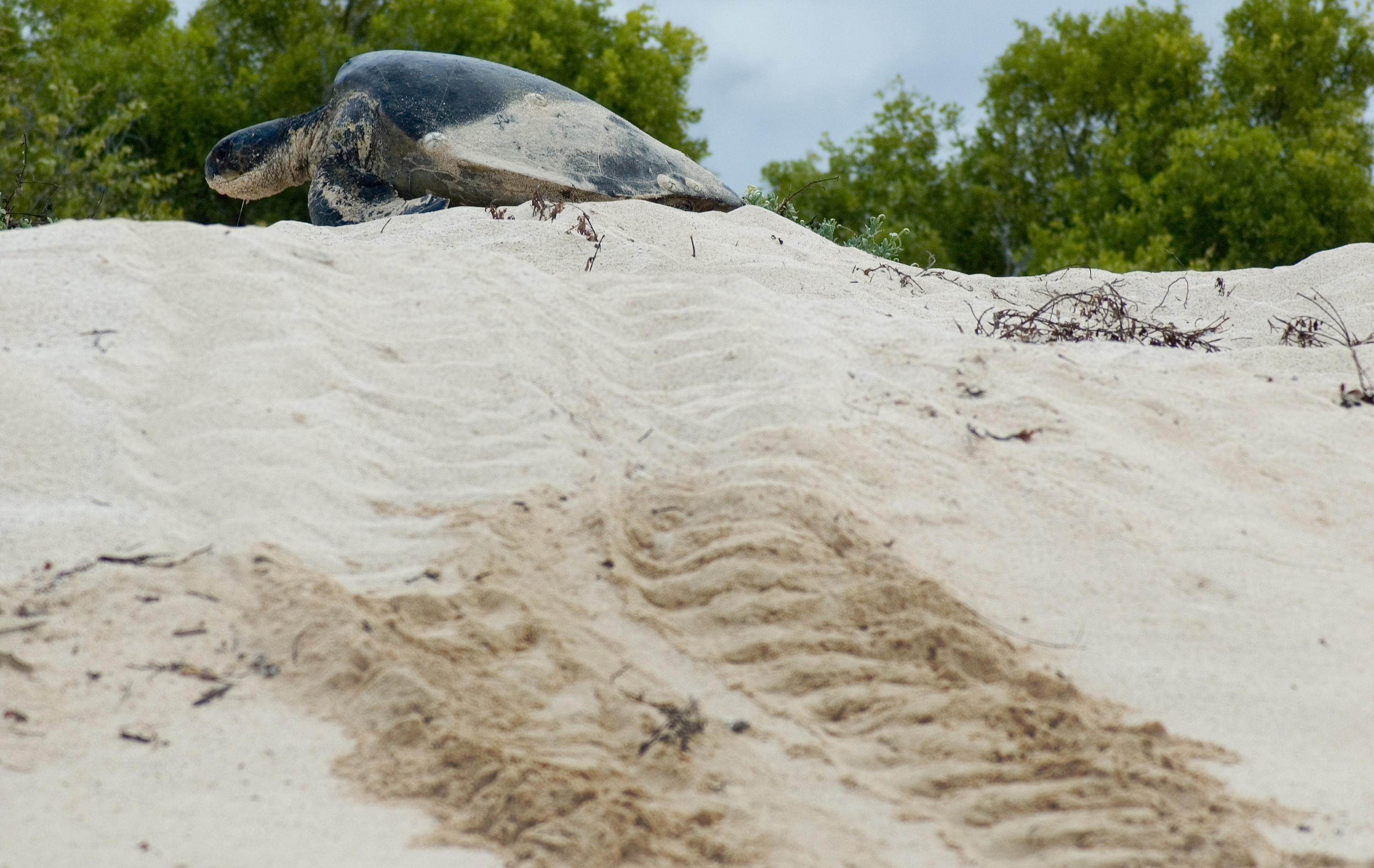
Sea Turtle laying eggs at designated natal beach

Geomagnetic imprinting is done by the use of inclination angle and field intensity to imprint onto the magnetic fields of the sea turtles natal homes. Imprinting is an innate learning process that is inherited within species to recognize important landmarks and resources. The use of geomagnetic imprinting helps the sea turtles to navigate back in later timelines. This process is not only used in sea turtles, but can also be seen in fish such as Salmo Salar (Atlantic salmon) and Bird migration. This method of navigation is important for female sea turtles, as it has been proven that they will return to their natal beaches to lay their own eggs. Intensity and inclination of the magnetic field depend on latitude, which is helpful in navigating the turtles north or south. This makes it easier for the turtles to follow along the coastline that is most related to their natal beach, ultimately guiding them back. Previous research concluded that returning to the natal beach in order to lay offspring is an advantage towards parasitic resistance and disease, which overall increases the fitness of the turtles.
