= Forest migration =

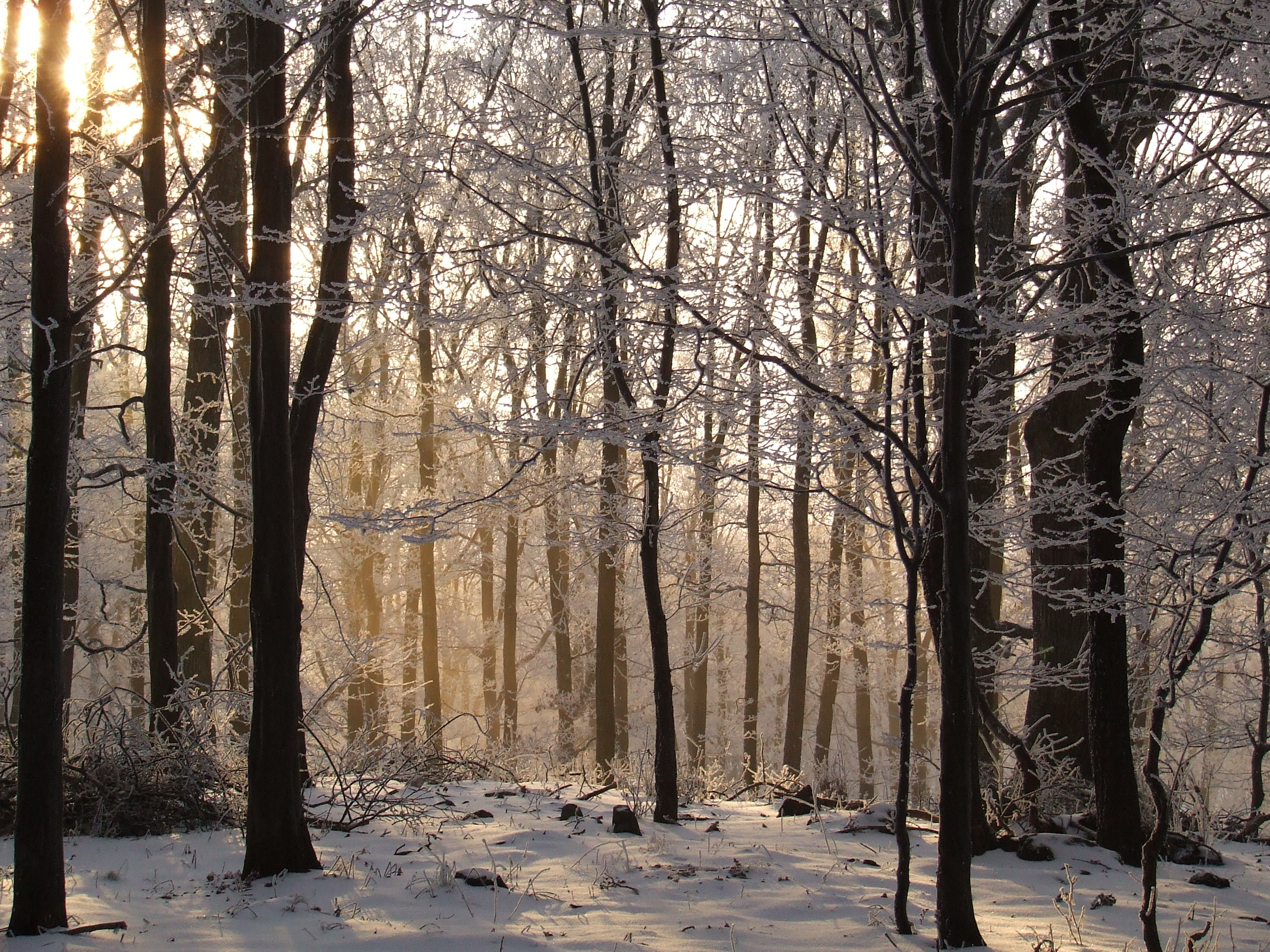
Beech forest in Mátra, Hungary in winter

Forest migration is the movement of large seed plant dominated communities in geographical space over time.

The emphasis of forest migration is placed on the movement of the populations that make up the forest community. Though an individual tree is permanently fixed in a location, tree populations may migrate over the landscape through successful dispersal and establishment into new regions and/or a lack of regeneration in a portion of its previous habitat range over the course of generations. Tree migration is controlled by two overlying forces: environmental suppression and dispersal capacity of the population by seed. Though the true rate of forest expansion is difficult to quantify, efforts are being made to evaluate and predict past, current, and future rates and extents of forest movements.

== Forces controlling forest migrations ==
Forest migration happens by the occurrence of two processes: population expansion into new habitat range and population retreat from historical habitat range. These processes are governed by two competing forces. The positive force of forest migration, plant population expansion, is governed by the seed dispersal capacity of the tree species' population and seedling establishment success. The population expansion limiting force, negative force, is the suppression by the environment of species' success in an area. Suppression by the environment could include human land use, disturbance, unfulfilled species-specific resource needs, and/or climatic stress.

These two major forces compete and change through time causing advances and retreats in the borders of plant populations' regions. An advance in the range border of a tree population occurs when environmental suppressive forces beyond the historical range fall below the population's dispersal and establishment potential, thus allowing for seedling success in new territory. This creates a 'leading edge' of the tree population habitat range.

Range border contractions occur when environmental suppressive forces increase to a point where seedling success is limited in the current range. Regeneration failure in a portion of a species' habitat range creates a lagging or 'trailing edge'. Though dispersal and environmental suppressive forces continually act, a static range boundary may occur when there is no change in the rate of these two factors.

== Zones within a plant population ==
There are three basic zones within each plant population; the reproductive core, the marginal establishment zone, and the outer seed shadow. The reproductive core of the plant population is the area in which sexually mature parental plants are present. This is the established reproductive source that provides the positive force for the population's expansion. The second region is the marginal establishment zone. In this region, seeds are successful and plants establish. The plants in this region have yet to reach reproductive maturity, thus they do not contribute to the seed dispersal potential of the population. The final region is the seed shadow region. In this region, inflow of seeds from the reproductive core is occurring, but because of environmental conditions germination or seedling survival is repressed causing an absence of species representatives in this region. This region is controlled by the negative force of the environment to the extent of zero success of the population.

== Rapid plant migration ==
There has been debate over how plant populations move under rapid climate change situations. This debate stems from an issue called "Reid's paradox of rapid plant migration". After the last glacial period, tree species spread to recover the newly exposed land. Through studies, it was calculated that this expansion occurred faster than perceived possible. The two explanations for this rapid movement of forest populations across the landscape that came to the forefront were the retention of low-density founder populations and long-distance migration.

=== Retention of low-density founder populations ===
In this theory, small forest populations were retained within the affected region of the last glacial period. The repopulation of this region, after the recession the glaciers, manifested as a relatively slow expansion outward of these retained populations. The expansion was mostly due to diffusion in a normal distribution from the reproductive core. The expansion of these populations was then dictated by the dispersal ability of the population. Through this process, waves of short distance expansion were seen over time as seeds dispersed, grew, matured, and set seed themselves. High rates of spread, similar to those obtained under the long-distance migration assumption, have been obtained with diffusion models incorporating low-density founder populations.

=== Rapid long distance migration ===
In this theory, populations moved directly from the area unaffected by glacial movement to their present boundaries by rare, long distance, successful dispersals. The movement of the population was dictated by rare events that occurred long distances from the parent population. These rare successes created their own parent populations, allowing for the subpopulation to disperse additional rare, long distance successes perpetuating the movement of the population. The distribution created by this kind of movement is described as a fat-tailed distribution. Though normal distribution, short distance expansion of each individual population still occurs, the overall expansion of the entire cluster of populations is determined by the long distance, rare events. This stretches the distribution due to increased weight at the extremes of the distribution. Long-distance migration is usually modeled using integro-difference equations with slowly decreasing dispersal kernels.

== Current climate change and its implications for forest migration ==
The Earth has entered another period of rapid climate change as a consequence of human's emissions of greenhouse gases. Since the early 20th century, the global air and sea surface temperature has increased about 0.8 °C (1.4 °F), with about two-thirds of the increase occurring since 1980. It is important to consider this statistic as being a global average. The effects of climate change may be highly heterogeneous over the landscape effecting different areas in different ways and magnitudes. The current climate change regime could have effects on the movement, persistence, and competition within and between plant communities. Also, the fact that forests are major constituents of habitat raises concerns on the effects of forest movement on climate change and greenhouse gas risk factors. Also some concern on the effects of forest migrations should be evaluated for wildlife because of the possibilities of forest fragmentations and extirpations.

It is important to consider that temperature is not the only relevant habitat change factor affected by climate change. Alterations in precipitation patterns, diurnal timing, seasonal intensity, and season length all can reduce the survivorship or reproductive ability of plant species by disrupting phenology and genetic fitness of the population.

The ability of plant species to track climate change will be valuable information in predicting the future health, stability, and function of the Earth's forests in the coming decades. If forest populations cannot successfully migrate in response to climate change, the consequences could include disrupted reproductive cycles, population fragmentation, genetic bottlenecking, and extirpation. Knowledge of the genetic structure and phenotypic limits of plant species gives insight to the range of climatic shifts a species can endure before migration becomes necessary for a species to avoid climate change-induced extinction or extirpation.

Generally, ideal tree habitat ranges are moving poleward for many species. The capacity for species to migrate in response to the ideal biogeographic range shifts has been questioned, especially in the context of extensive habitat fragmentation which occurs in modern-day landscapes.

Simulation models are presented which incorporate two factors, land use pattern and means of dispersal, to assess potential responses of forest species to climatic warming. Study areas displayed a range of human influence on the landscape, from heavily forested areas to areas dominated by urbanization and agriculture. The effect of establishing corridors (greenways) through fragmented landscapes is also assessed.

Results indicate that many species may be unable to track shifts in climatically-controlled range limits, resulting in widespread disequilibrium between vegetation and climate. A variety of mitigating options likely will be necessary to offset the negative consequences of climatic warming on biological diversity. Land use planners and managers are encouraged to incorporate climate warming into long-term planning.

== Human assistance in forest migration ==
As early as the late 1990s, foresters in the southern United States had realized that pines grew better in the seeding zones north of their historical ranges as a result of climate change. They modified their seedings practices accordingly. Early scientific studies of assisted migration of forests have shown that good results were obtained when tree species were migrated near their current range. Following this discovery, some provinces and states modified their tree seeding guidelines to reflect this reality. Canadian policymakers feared that, if they did not set the assisted migration guidelines, the private sector would be tempted to do it on its own.

The use of assisted migration has also been proposed as a mitigation tool in forest decline due to climate change. This process involves the movement and establishment of forest species in new areas in hopes they will colonize. It is thought that if assisted migration is utilized in an organized manner, species could be saved by allowing for rapid movement across the landscape. This process has been debated for its advantages and disadvantages with the intent of using it in the most beneficial manner. Supporters of this tool focus on the benefits of saving tree species from extinction, while those who oppose the idea have the concern of introducing pest species into unexposed regions. Attention must also be paid to the genetic effects translocation of plants may have to the population and surrounding populations. The possible problems associated with this process include founder effects, and the introduction of unadapted genotypes which could harm the fitness of surrounding populations.

A proposed aid to natural forest migration is the upkeep of intraspecific biodiversity. Biodiversity within a species is an important factor in the ability of a population to adapt. This is both beneficial for population stability as climates change, as well as increasing the likelihood of progeny success in new areas outside the current range.

== Forest migrations past, present and future ==
To gain knowledge about the effects current climate change will have on the Earth's forests, many researchers have looked to past examples to draw information. Many studies have investigated the movement of forest species across glacially disrupted areas in the early Holocene period. Some studies have utilized fossilized pollen analysis, while others have used molecular genetics. Overall, it is perceived that forests can and did alter their geographical distributions to populate land through time. There is also strong evidence to support these movements were, in some cases, directional with respect to an outside force.

Investigations are also taking place on current forest migration based on recent information. These studies are generally directed to the altitudinal shifts in forest species on mountains. The conclusion drawn from these studies is that forest populations are increasing in altitudes. This movement is strongly correlated to the current era of climate change.

Lastly, much effort has been put forth to try to model and predict future fates of forest populations. The results of these efforts have been varied and, in many cases, inconclusive. The future of plant migrations has proven to be hard to predict. The many unknowns about the limits of population migration, phenotypic plasticity, genetic capacity, species interaction, and current climate change cause have complicated the issue, and have made modeling, at this point, difficult. Studies should be directed to gaining knowledge about adaptation genetics, phenotypic limits of ecotypes, and create models incorporating more relevant factors.

=== Examples of natural forest species migration ===
==== Scandinavian tree species migration ====
Scandinavian species of Tilia, Picea, Fagus, and Quercus have moved in their distributions in the past 8,000 years. Through fossilized pollen, it was found that Tilia and Quercus species moved significantly and directionally northward. Though Fagus and Picea populations did not expand directionally, they have grown in the Scandinavian range. The movement of Picea species in the past 1000 years has shown a strong connection to climate change through a model comparison.

==== Catalonia, Spain tree species elevation shifts ====
In the more recent past, there has been documentation of elevation shifts in distribution of many core forest tree species of Catalonia. The populations of two tree species (European beech, Fagus sylvatica; and holm oak, Quercus ilex) were evaluated in their dynamics over elevations through time. Generally, holm oak reside lower on mountain slopes than does European beech. In the past fifty years an increase in temperature of 1.5 °C was seen in the tested mountain range. This rise in temperature altered the transpiration rates and is believed to be causing the area to become more arid. The change in local microclimate of the region seemed to favor the success of the holm oak population, causing it to rise in elevation invading the natural range of European beech. European Birch (Betula pendula) has also elevated its range in altitude. The movements of these ranges are strongly linked to climate change, which has allowed for better establishment and success at higher latitudes.

==== Elevation rise in tree and shrub species in the Swedish Scandes ====
In 2002, it was found that saplings were occurring in elevations previously not seen. Birch saplings were found at elevations between 1370 and 1410 m above sea level (a.s.l). In 1955 no seedlings of this species were found above 1095 m a.s.l. It was found that the populations of Picea abies had moved 240 m in elevation in the previous 50 years. Increases were also found in other regional tree and shrub species. The plants growing outside of the previous established range also have shown low injury rate, and signs of healthy growth. In addition to these increases in elevation the past century, increases in birch seed viability has been seen in a long-term study.

=== Examples of human-assisted forest species migration ===
==== Assisted migration of the western larch ====
In 2010, the Government of British Columbia implemented an assisted migration program to move the western larch to a new habitat in Northern British Columbia, about 1000 kilometers north of its current range. This was the first assisted migration program for a North American tree. Research had shown that the western larch, the most productive of the three species of larch native to North America, has no trouble growing in northern BC. This selected areas' climatic conditions are predicted to match the western larch's historical range by 2030.

== See also ==
- Seed dispersal
