= Drumsite =

Locality in Christmas Island, Australia

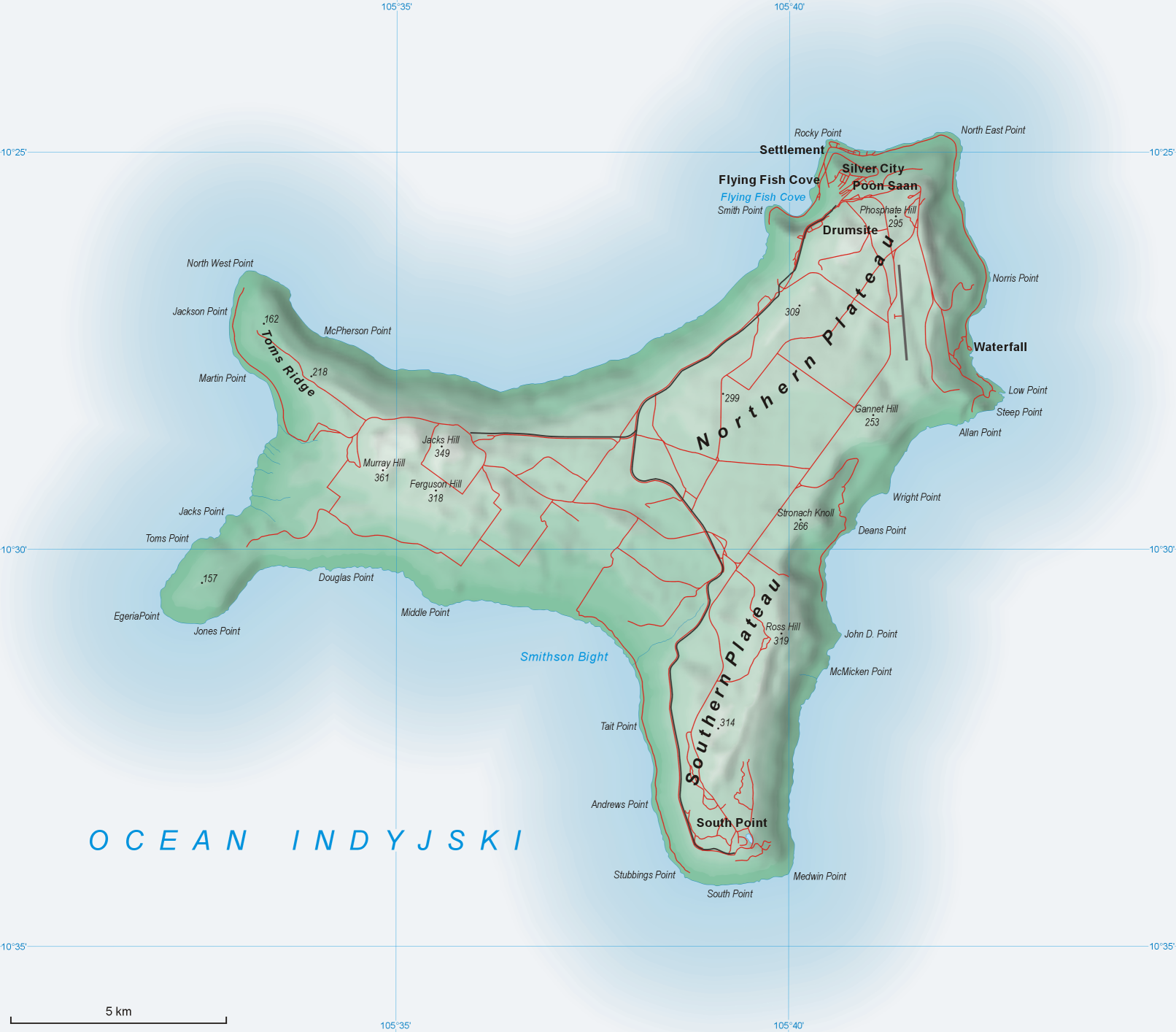
- Map of Christmas Island with marked Drumsite

- Coordinates: 10°25′55″S 105°40′20″E
- Country: Australia
- State: Australia

Drumsite is a village in Christmas Island. The village's population consists mostly of Chinese and European workers. A project that built townhouses in the village was built in 2013 amid concerns about asylum seekers going to Christmas Island.

The village itself is in the path of the migration routes of Christmas Island red crabs. Landmarks Bungalow 702 and the Drumsite Industrial Area are located within the village. They are both listed on the Australian Commonwealth Heritage List.

== Description ==
Drumsite is a village located in Christmas Island. The ethnic composition of the population of Drumsite are mostly Chinese and European workers. Through the Drumsite Village project, a new housing development that housed townhouses, were built in 2013 to house government workers. Approved by the Gillard administration, Australian Federal Police officers, healthcare workers, and teachers who work with refugee children, gained access to the townhouses amid concerns about the growing number of asylum seekers on the island. The development would also be available to the generic public as its designation as a resort.

== Fauna ==
The area of Drumsite is located in the path of the migration routes of Christmas Island red crabs. In 2021, Parks Australia had opined that residents of Drumsite could not leave their homes due to the amount of crabs that were present during the migration.

== Landmarks ==
Bungalow 702, a rendered brick masonry and timber building on rendered masonry piles with prominent concrete caps, is located in Drumsite. Through oral tradition, it was said to be used by Japanese soldiers as a radio station during the Island's occupation in World War II. Another landmark is the Drumsite Industrial Area, an area that includes remnants of an incline railway which held an important role in the history of phosphate mining on Christmas Island. Both are listed on the Australian Commonwealth Heritage List.
