= List of administrative heads of the Cocos (Keeling) Islands =

This is a list of the administrative heads of Cocos (Keeling) Islands since 23 November 1955, when it became an external territory of the Commonwealth of Australia.

== History ==
Originally an uninhabited island group, the first formal authority on the Cocos (Keeling) Islands came from the Clunies-Ross family ruling over the islands as self-proclaimed kings over their workers and paying them in worthless plastic coins they could only spend in their shop. The islands originally had nominal oversight with a non-resident British Administrator appointed by the Governor of Singapore due to the Clunies-Ross being loyal to the British Empire. In 1955, the United Kingdom transferred the Cocos (Keeling) Islands to become a territory of Australia with the government of Australia appointing a Representative to administer it. The Clunies-Ross family lost their government administration power but retained lawmaking authority and remained as landlord and employer of the majority of the inhabitants.

In 1975, the Representative was replaced by an Administrator by the Australian government, in order to take a more active role in education and employment in the territory. In 1984, due to a United Nations investigation calling for Australia to modernise the governance system on the islands, the islanders voted in favour of integration with Australia in a referendum over independence or retaining the existing system. In 1996, the role of Administrator of the Cocos (Keeling) Islands was merged with the Administrator of Christmas Island to create the united Administrator of the Australian Indian Ocean Territories.

== List ==
Ordinal	Officeholder	Title	Term start	Term end	Time in office	Notes
Cocos (Keeling) Islands Territory of the Commonwealth of Australia
1	H. J. Hull	Official Representative of Cocos (Keeling) Islands	23 November 1955	13 November 1957	1 year; 11 months; 3 days	
2	C. H. Cox	Acting Official Representative of Cocos (Keeling) Islands	14 December 1957	13 March 1958	2 months; 3 weeks; 6 days	
3	John William Stokes	Official Representative of Cocos (Keeling) Islands	8 November 1958	27 July 1960	1 year; 8 months; 2 weeks; 4 days	
4	Charles Ivens Buffett	Official Representative of Cocos (Keeling) Islands	27 July 1960	17 April 1966	5 years; 8 months; 3 weeks	
5	P. L. Ryan	Official Representative of Cocos (Keeling) Islands	18 April 1966	19 June 1966	2 months; 1 day	
6	Peter C. Burbrook	Official Representative of Cocos (Keeling) Islands	20 June 1966	25 June 1969	3 years; 5 days	
7	C. W. Suthern	Official Representative of Cocos (Keeling) Islands	26 June 1969	28 July 1972	3 years; 1 month; 2 days	
8	C. McManus	Official Representative of Cocos (Keeling) Islands	29 July 1972	16 July 1975	2 years; 11 months; 2 weeks; 3 days	
9	Robert James Linford	Administrator of Cocos (Keeling) Islands	23 July 1975	15 November 1977	2 years; 3 months; 3 weeks; 2 days	
10	Charles Ivens Buffett	Administrator of Cocos (Keeling) Islands	16 November 1977	25 July 1979	1 year; 8 months; 1 week; 1 day	
Granted autonomy from the Commonwealth of Australia
(10)	Charles Ivens Buffett	Administrator of Cocos (Keeling) Islands	25 July 1979	31 December 1981	2 years; 5 months; 1 week	(contd.)
11	Eric Herbert Hanfield	Administrator of Cocos (Keeling) Islands	21 April 1982	22 November 1983	1 year; 7 months; 1 day	
12	Kenneth Chan	Administrator of Cocos (Keeling) Islands	14 December 1983	6 April 1984	3 months; 3 weeks; 1 day	
Integrated with Australia in an act of self-determination (see 1984 status referendum)
(12)	Kenneth Chan	Administrator of Cocos (Keeling) Islands	6 April 1984	19 November 1985	1 year; 7 months; 2 weeks	(contd.)
13	Carolyn Stuart	Administrator of Cocos (Keeling) Islands	20 November 1985	[31] December 1987	2 years; 1 month; 1 week; 4 days	
−	W. N. Syrette	Acting Administrator of Cocos (Keeling) Islands	[1] January 1988	30 June 1988	5 months; 4 weeks	
−	M. Jopling	Acting Administrator of Cocos (Keeling) Islands	1 July 1988	7 November 1988	4 months; 1 week	
14	Dawn Lawrie	Administrator of Cocos (Keeling) Islands	8 November 1988	27 November 1990	2 years; 2 weeks; 5 days	
15	Barry T. Cunningham	Administrator of Cocos (Keeling) Islands	1 December 1990	4 December 1992	2 years; 3 days	
16	John Bell Read	Administrator of Cocos (Keeling) Islands	5 December 1992	4 December 1994	1 year; 11 months; 4 weeks; 1 day	
−	Danny Ambrose Gillespie	Acting Administrator of Cocos (Keeling) Islands	4 December 1994	31 January 1995	1 month; 3 weeks; 6 days	
17	Martin Mowbray	Administrator of Cocos (Keeling) Islands	1 February 1995	30 January 1996	11 months; 4 weeks; 1 day	
−	Jarl Andersson	Acting Administrator of Cocos (Keeling) Islands	1 February 1996	1 July 1996	5 months	
Part of Australian Indian Ocean Territories of the Commonwealth of Australia
(−)	Jarl Andersson	Acting Administrator of Cocos (Keeling) Islands; Acting Administrator of the Australian Indian Ocean Territories	1 July 1996	12 April 1997	9 months; 1 week; 5 days	(contd.)
18	Maureen Ellis	Acting Administrator of Cocos (Keeling) Islands; Acting Administrator of the Australian Indian Ocean Territories	12 April 1997	30 September 1997	5 months; 2 weeks; 4 days	
19	Ronald George Harvey	Acting Administrator of Cocos (Keeling) Islands; Acting Administrator of the Australian Indian Ocean Territories	1 October 1997	30 October 1998	1 year; 1 month	
−	Graham Nicholls	Acting Administrator of the Cocos (Keeling) Islands; Acting Administrator of Christmas Island; Acting Administrator of Australian Indian Ocean Territories	1 November 1998	3 February 1999	3 months; 2 days	
20	William "Bill" Leonard Taylor	Administrator of the Cocos (Keeling) Islands; Administrator of Christmas Island; Administrator of Australian Indian Ocean Territories	4 February 1999	30 July 2003	4 years; 5 months; 3 weeks; 4 days	
−	Ray Stone	Acting Administrator of the Cocos (Keeling) Islands; Acting Administrator of Christmas Island; Acting Administrator of Australian Indian Ocean Territories	31 July 2003	1 November 2003	3 months; 1 day	
21	Evan Williams	Administrator of the Cocos (Keeling) Islands; Administrator of Christmas Island; Administrator of Australian Indian Ocean Territories	1 November 2003	31 October 2005	1 year; 11 months; 4 weeks; 2 days	
22	Neil Lucas	Administrator of the Cocos (Keeling) Islands; Administrator of Christmas Island; Administrator of Australian Indian Ocean Territories	30 January 2006	22 February 2008	2 years; 3 weeks; 2 days	
−	Julian Yates	Acting Administrator of the Cocos (Keeling) Islands; Acting Administrator of Christmas Island; Acting Administrator of Australian Indian Ocean Territories	22 February 2008	28 February 2008	6 days	
−	Sheryl Klaffer	Acting Administrator of the Cocos (Keeling) Islands; Acting Administrator of Christmas Island; Acting Administrator of Australian Indian Ocean Territories	28 February 2009	2009	0 years	
−	Stephen Clay	Acting Administrator of the Cocos (Keeling) Islands; Acting Administrator of Christmas Island; Acting Administrator of Australian Indian Ocean Territories	2009	5 October 2009	0 years	
23	Brian James Lacy	Administrator of the Cocos (Keeling) Islands; Administrator of Christmas Island; Administrator of Australian Indian Ocean Territories	5 October 2009	29 September 2012	2 years; 11 months; 3 weeks; 3 days	
24	Jon Stanhope	Administrator of the Cocos (Keeling) Islands; Administrator of Christmas Island; Administrator of Australian Indian Ocean Territories	5 October 2012	6 October 2014	2 years; 1 day	
25	Barry Haase	Administrator of the Cocos (Keeling) Islands; Administrator of Christmas Island; Administrator of Australian Indian Ocean Territories	6 October 2014	4 October 2017	2 years; 11 months; 4 weeks	
26	Natasha Griggs	Administrator of the Cocos (Keeling) Islands; Administrator of Christmas Island; Administrator of Australian Indian Ocean Territories	5 October 2017	4 October 2022	4 years; 11 months; 4 weeks; 1 day	
27	Sarah Vandenbroek	Acting Administrator of the Cocos (Keeling) Islands; Acting Administrator of Christmas Island; Acting Administrator of Australian Indian Ocean Territories	4 October 2022	26 May 2023	7 months; 3 weeks; 1 day	
28	Farzian Zainal	Administrator of the Cocos (Keeling) Islands; Administrator of Christmas Island; Administrator of Australian Indian Ocean Territories	26 May 2023	incumbent	3 years, 174 days	

== See also ==
- King of the Cocos Islands
- List of administrative heads of Christmas Island
