= List of administrative heads of Christmas Island =

Flag of Christmas Island

This is a list of the administrative heads of Christmas Island since 1 October 1958, when it became an external territory of the Commonwealth of Australia.

== History ==
Christmas Island was initially administered as part of British Ceylon or the Colony of Singapore by their respective Governors within the British Empire. During the Second World War, it was occupied by the Japanese. In 1958, following Australian phosphate miners settling there, the territory was formally transferred from the United Kingdom to Australia with the government of Australia appointing an Official Representative to administer Christmas Island. In 1968, the position was renamed to Administrator of Christmas Island. In 1996, the role of Administrator of the Christmas Island was merged with the Administrator of the Cocos (Keeling) Islands to create the united Administrator of the Australian Indian Ocean Territories. The Administrator is traditionally sworn into office by the Governor-General of Australia, acting on behalf of the King of Australia, King Charles III.

In Australian Federal elections, Christmas Island is part of the division of Lingiari but residents cannot vote in Western Australian local elections and the Administrator is unable to block measures implemented by the government of Australia on Christmas Island. Before 2009, Christmas Island did not have an administrator appointed for 18 months, before Brian Lacy was appointed to oversee Christmas Island and its Australian immigration detention centre.

== List ==
Ordinal	Officeholder	Title	Term start	Term end	Time in office	Notes
Christmas Island Territory of the Commonwealth of Australia
1	Donald Evan Nickels	Official Representative of Christmas Island	1 October 1958	30 September 1960	1 year, 365 days	
2	John William Stokes	Official Representative of Christmas Island	1 October 1960	12 June 1966	5 years, 254 days	
3	Charles Ivens Buffett	Official Representative of Christmas Island	13 June 1966	30 April 1968	1 year, 322 days	
4	Leslie Dudley King	Administrator of Christmas Island	1 May 1968	30 April 1970	1 year, 364 days	
5	John Sampson White	Administrator of Christmas Island	1 May 1970	14 March 1973	2 years, 317 days	
6	Francis Scott "Frank" Evatt	Administrator of Christmas Island	15 March 1973	14 March 1974	364 days	
7	Charles Harry Webb	Administrator of Christmas Island	15 March 1974	8 October 1975	1 year, 207 days	
8	William Worth	Administrator of Christmas Island	1 November 1975	31 October 1977	1 year, 364 days	
9	Francis Charles Boyle	Administrator of Christmas Island	1 November 1977	4 May 1980	2 years, 185 days	
10	Rendle McNeilage Holten	Administrator of Christmas Island	19 May 1980	25 May 1982	2 years, 6 days	
11	William Yates	Administrator of Christmas Island	26 May 1982	9 August 1983	1 year, 75 days	
12	Thomas Ferguson "Tom" Paterson	Administrator of Christmas Island	10 August 1983	15 April 1986	2 years, 248 days	
−	C. Stephens	Acting Administrator of Christmas Island	15 April 1986	3 August 1986	110 days	
13	Don Taylor	Administrator of Christmas Island	4 August 1986	24 February 1990	3 years, 204 days	
14	William Albany "Bill" McKenzie	Administrator of Christmas Island	25 February 1990	2 May 1991	1 year, 66 days	
−	A. Mitchell	Acting Administrator of Christmas Island	2 May 1991	4 July 1991	63 days	
−	P. Gifford	Acting Administrator of Christmas Island	5 July 1991	9 March 1992	248 days	
15	Michael John Grimes	Administrator of Christmas Island	10 March 1992	9 March 1994	1 year, 364 days	
−	Peter Woods	Acting Administrator of Christmas Island	10 March 1994	30 June 1994	112 days	
16	Danny Ambrose Gillespie	Administrator of Christmas Island	1 July 1994	30 June 1996	1 year, 365 days	
Part of Australian Indian Ocean Territories of the Commonwealth of Australia
−	Merrilyn Ann Chilvers	Acting Administrator of Christmas Island; Acting Administrator of Australian Indian Ocean Territories	1 July 1996	24 April 1997	297 days	
−	Graham Nicholls	Acting Administrator of Christmas Island; Acting Administrator of Australian Indian Ocean Territories	25 April 1997	30 September 1997	158 days	1st Term
17	Ron G. Harvey	Administrator of Christmas Island; Administrator of Australian Indian Ocean Territories	1 October 1997	30 October 1998	1 year, 29 days	
(−)	Graham Nicholls	Acting Administrator of Christmas Island; Acting Administrator of Australian Indian Ocean Territories; Acting Administrator of the Cocos (Keeling) Islands	1 November 1998	3 February 1999	94 days	2nd Term
18	William "Bill" Leonard Taylor	Administrator of Christmas Island; Administrator of Australian Indian Ocean Territories; Administrator of the Cocos (Keeling) Islands	4 February 1999	30 July 2003	4 years, 176 days	
−	Ray Stone	Acting Administrator of Christmas Island; Acting Administrator of Australian Indian Ocean Territories; Acting Administrator of the Cocos (Keeling) Islands	31 July 2003	1 November 2003	93 days	
19	Evan Williams	Administrator of Christmas Island; Administrator of Australian Indian Ocean Territories; Administrator of the Cocos (Keeling) Islands	1 November 2003	31 October 2005	2 years, 92 days	
20	Neil Lucas	Administrator of Christmas Island; Administrator of Australian Indian Ocean Territories; Administrator of the Cocos (Keeling) Islands	30 January 2006	22 February 2008	2 years, 23 days	
−	Julian Yates	Acting Administrator of Christmas Island; Acting Administrator of Australian Indian Ocean Territories; Acting Administrator of the Cocos (Keeling) Islands	22 February 2008	28 February 2008	6 days	
−	Sheryl Klaffer	Acting Administrator of Christmas Island; Acting Administrator of Australian Indian Ocean Territories; Acting Administrator of the Cocos (Keeling) Islands	28 February 2009	2009	0 years	
−	Stephen Clay	Acting Administrator of Christmas Island; Acting Administrator of Australian Indian Ocean Territories; Acting Administrator of the Cocos (Keeling) Islands	2009	5 October 2009	0 years	
21	Brian James Lacy	Administrator of Christmas Island; Administrator of Australian Indian Ocean Territories; Administrator of the Cocos (Keeling) Islands	5 October 2009	29 September 2012	2 years, 360 days	
22	Jon Stanhope	Administrator of Christmas Island; Administrator of Australian Indian Ocean Territories; Administrator of the Cocos (Keeling) Islands	5 October 2012	6 October 2014	2 years, 1 day	
23	Barry Haase	Administrator of Christmas Island; Administrator of Australian Indian Ocean Territories; Administrator of the Cocos (Keeling) Islands	6 October 2014	5 October 2017	2 years, 364 days	
24	Natasha Griggs	Administrator of Christmas Island; Administrator of Australian Indian Ocean Territories; Administrator of the Cocos (Keeling) Islands	5 October 2017	22 October 2022	5 years, 17 days	
24	Farzian Zainal	Administrator of Christmas Island; Administrator of Australian Indian Ocean Territories; Administrator of the Cocos (Keeling) Islands	26 May 2023	Incumbent	3 years, 159 days	

== See also ==
- List of administrative heads of the Cocos (Keeling) Islands
- Administrator's House, Christmas Island
