= Electoral results for the Division of Groom =

Australian division election results

This is a list of electoral results for the Division of Groom in Australian federal elections from the division's creation in 1984 until the present.

== Members ==
Member	Party	Term
Tom McVeigh	National	1984–1988
Bill Taylor	Liberal	1988–1998
Ian Macfarlane	Liberal	1998–2010
Ian Macfarlane	Liberal National	2010–2016
John McVeigh	Liberal National	2016–2020
Garth Hamilton	Liberal National	2020–present

== Election results ==
=== Elections in the 2020s ===
==== 2025 ====
2025 Australian federal election: Groom
Party	Candidate	Votes	%	±%
Independent	Suzie Holt			
One Nation	Rebecca Konz			
Family First	Alexandra Todd			
Greens	Alyce Nelligan			
Liberal National	Garth Hamilton			
Independent	Kirstie Smolenski			
Trumpet of Patriots	Jamie Marr			
Labor	Richard Edwards			
Total formal votes				
Informal votes				
Turnout				

==== 2022 ====
2022 Australian federal election: Groom
Party	Candidate	Votes	%	±%
Liberal National	Garth Hamilton	41,971	43.72	−9.62
Labor	Gen Allpass	17,985	18.73	+0.07
One Nation	Grant Abraham	9,181	9.56	−3.53
Independent	Suzie Holt	7,932	8.26	+8.26
Independent	Kirstie Smolenski	6,858	7.14	+7.14
Greens	Mickey Berry	5,616	5.85	−2.11
United Australia	Melissa Bannister	4,922	5.13	+1.17
Federation	Ryan Otto	1,539	1.60	+1.60
Total formal votes		96,004	95.28	−1.52
Informal votes		4,758	4.72	+1.52
Turnout		100,762	90.88	−2.17
Notional two-party-preferred count
Liberal National	Garth Hamilton	61,610	64.17	−6.31
Labor	Gen Allpass	34,394	35.83	+6.31
Two-candidate-preferred result
Liberal National	Garth Hamilton	54,612	56.89	−13.59
Independent	Suzie Holt	41,392	43.11	+43.11
Liberal National hold		Swing	−13.59	

Alluvial diagram for preference flows in the seat of Groom in the 2022 federal election. indicates at what stage the winning candidate had over 50% of the votes and was declared the winner.

==== 2020 by-election ====
2020 Groom by-election
Party	Candidate	Votes	%	±%
Liberal National	Garth Hamilton	51,534	59.83	+6.49
Labor	Chris Meibusch	23,500	27.28	+8.62
Sustainable Australia	Sandra Jephcott	6,716	7.80	+7.80
Liberal Democrats	Craig Farquharson	4,391	5.10	+5.10
Total formal votes		86,141	97.18	+0.38
Informal votes		2,504	2.82	−0.38
Turnout		88,645	81.66	−11.38
Two-party-preferred result
Liberal National	Garth Hamilton	57,875	67.19	−3.29
Labor	Chris Meibusch	28,266	32.81	+3.29
Liberal National hold		Swing	−3.29	

=== Elections in the 2010s ===
==== 2019 ====
2019 Australian federal election: Groom
Party	Candidate	Votes	%	±%
Liberal National	John McVeigh	50,908	53.34	−0.66
Labor	Troy Kay	17,811	18.66	−3.54
One Nation	David King	12,493	13.09	+13.09
Greens	Alyce Nelligan	7,598	7.96	+1.80
United Australia	Kenneth Law	3,784	3.96	+3.96
Conservative National	Perry Adrelius	2,854	2.99	+2.99
Total formal votes		95,448	96.80	+0.37
Informal votes		3,160	3.20	−0.37
Turnout		98,608	93.05	−0.06
Two-party-preferred result
Liberal National	John McVeigh	67,274	70.48	+5.17
Labor	Troy Kay	28,174	29.52	−5.17
Liberal National hold		Swing	+5.17	

==== 2016 ====
2016 Australian federal election: Groom
Party	Candidate	Votes	%	±%
Liberal National	John McVeigh	49,270	54.00	−1.64
Labor	Bronwyn Herbertson	20,259	22.20	+0.10
Family First	John Sands	9,140	10.02	+7.36
Xenophon	Josie Townsend	6,960	7.63	+7.63
Greens	Antonia van Geuns	5,618	6.16	+1.82
Total formal votes		91,247	96.43	+0.42
Informal votes		3,380	3.57	−0.42
Turnout		94,627	93.22	−1.35
Two-party-preferred result
Liberal National	John McVeigh	59,589	65.31	−1.16
Labor	Bronwyn Herbertson	31,658	34.69	+1.16
Liberal National hold		Swing	−1.16	

==== 2013 ====
2013 Australian federal election: Groom
Party	Candidate	Votes	%	±%
Liberal National	Ian Macfarlane	48,966	55.64	−5.61
Labor	Troy Murray	19,451	22.10	−0.57
Palmer United	Ewen Mathieson	8,225	9.35	+9.35
Greens	Trevor Smith	3,823	4.34	−2.96
Katter's Australian	Chris Whitty	3,243	3.69	+3.69
Family First	Alex Todd	2,342	2.66	−2.90
Rise Up Australia	Rick Armitage	1,210	1.37	+1.37
Citizens Electoral Council	Robert Thies	743	0.84	+0.84
Total formal votes		88,003	96.01	+0.16
Informal votes		3,656	3.99	−0.16
Turnout		91,659	94.58	+0.16
Two-party-preferred result
Liberal National	Ian Macfarlane	58,493	66.47	−2.06
Labor	Troy Murray	29,510	33.53	+2.06
Liberal National hold		Swing	−2.06	

==== 2010 ====
2010 Australian federal election: Groom
Party	Candidate	Votes	%	±%
Liberal National	Ian Macfarlane	51,757	61.25	+8.54
Labor	Chris Meibusch	19,153	22.67	−12.16
Greens	Frida Forsberg	6,165	7.30	+2.46
Family First	Rose Kirkwood	4,696	5.56	+1.18
Independent	Rod Jeanneret	2,730	3.23	+2.63
Total formal votes		84,501	95.85	−1.09
Informal votes		3,655	4.15	+1.09
Turnout		88,156	94.41	−1.05
Two-party-preferred result
Liberal National	Ian Macfarlane	57,912	68.53	+10.31
Labor	Chris Meibusch	26,589	31.47	−10.31
Liberal National hold		Swing	+10.31	

=== Elections in the 2000s ===
==== 2007 ====
2007 Australian federal election: Groom
Party	Candidate	Votes	%	±%
Liberal	Ian Macfarlane	43,880	52.71	−7.52
Labor	Chris Meibusch	28,994	34.83	+10.73
Greens	Pauline Collins	4,028	4.84	+0.82
Family First	Peter Findlay	3,649	4.38	−1.99
Independent	Rob Berry	715	0.86	+0.86
Independent	Grahame Volker	616	0.74	+0.74
Democrats	Shalina Najeeb	608	0.73	−0.33
Independent	Rod Jeanneret	497	0.60	−1.75
Citizens Electoral Council	Irene Jones	263	0.32	−0.06
Total formal votes		83,250	96.94	+0.94
Informal votes		2,627	3.06	−0.94
Turnout		85,877	95.51	+0.14
Two-party-preferred result
Liberal	Ian Macfarlane	48,468	58.22	−10.59
Labor	Chris Meibusch	34,782	41.78	+10.59
Liberal hold		Swing	−10.59	

==== 2004 ====
2004 Australian federal election: Groom
Party	Candidate	Votes	%	±%
Liberal	Ian Macfarlane	49,131	60.36	+13.50
Labor	Paul King	19,516	23.98	+0.32
Family First	Peter Findlay	5,168	6.35	+6.35
Greens	Karey Harrison	3,252	4.00	+0.45
Independent	Rod Jeanneret	1,929	2.37	+2.37
Great Australians	Noel Wieck	1,230	1.51	+1.51
Democrats	Christoph Donges	860	1.06	−2.17
Citizens Electoral Council	Oliver Carter	310	0.38	+0.38
Total formal votes		81,396	96.00	−0.57
Informal votes		3,392	4.00	+0.57
Turnout		84,788	94.69	−1.98
Two-party-preferred result
Liberal	Ian Macfarlane	56,121	68.95	+3.86
Labor	Paul King	25,275	31.05	−3.86
Liberal hold		Swing	+3.86	

==== 2001 ====
2001 Australian federal election: Groom
Party	Candidate	Votes	%	±%
Liberal	Ian Macfarlane	36,573	46.86	+13.79
Labor	Leeann King	18,467	23.66	−1.57
National	Barbara Wuersching	8,563	10.97	−4.25
One Nation	David Hoy	6,958	8.92	−9.05
Greens	Michael Kane	2,774	3.55	+1.80
Democrats	Stephen Eyres	2,521	3.23	+0.55
Independent	Rob Berry	2,192	2.81	+2.81
Total formal votes		78,048	96.57	−0.69
Informal votes		2,776	3.43	+0.69
Turnout		80,824	96.06	
Two-party-preferred result
Liberal	Ian Macfarlane	50,802	65.09	+2.05
Labor	Leeann King	27,246	34.91	−2.05
Liberal hold		Swing	+2.05	

=== Elections in the 1990s ===
==== 1998 ====
1998 Australian federal election: Groom
Party	Candidate	Votes	%	±%
Liberal	Ian Macfarlane	24,631	33.07	−24.99
Labor	Geoff Brown	18,787	25.23	+3.11
One Nation	Avril Baynes	13,382	17.97	+17.97
National	Bruce Green	11,335	15.22	+8.02
Democrats	Glenn Polson	1,993	2.68	−2.99
Independent	Cynthia Mayne	1,629	2.19	+2.19
Christian Democrats	Paul Harry	1,409	1.89	+1.89
Greens	Sarah Moles	1,307	1.75	−0.38
Total formal votes		74,473	97.26	−0.43
Informal votes		2,100	2.74	+0.43
Turnout		76,573	95.27	−0.26
Two-party-preferred result
Liberal	Ian Macfarlane	46,951	63.04	−8.25
Labor	Geoff Brown	27,522	36.96	+8.25
Liberal hold		Swing	−8.25	

==== 1996 ====
1996 Australian federal election: Groom
Party	Candidate	Votes	%	±%
Liberal	Bill Taylor	50,046	64.82	+30.44
Labor	Neville Green	17,085	22.13	−4.67
Democrats	Mark Carew	4,459	5.78	+2.01
Greens	Sarah Moles	1,789	2.32	+0.05
Independent	Peter Ousby	1,657	2.15	+2.15
One Australia	Ray Buckley	1,578	2.04	+2.04
Indigenous Peoples	W. J. McCarthy	595	0.77	−0.43
Total formal votes		77,209	97.71	+0.13
Informal votes		1,813	2.29	−0.13
Turnout		79,022	95.52	−0.70
Two-party-preferred result
Liberal	Bill Taylor	54,894	71.28	+7.16
Labor	Neville Green	22,117	28.72	−7.16
Liberal hold		Swing	+7.16	

==== 1993 ====
1993 Australian federal election: Groom
Party	Candidate	Votes	%	±%
Liberal	Bill Taylor	25,915	34.38	−5.80
Labor	Ray Webber	20,198	26.80	−3.92
National	Joe Hanna	16,131	21.40	+4.02
Confederate Action	Garry Berghofer	7,672	10.18	+10.18
Democrats	Alan May	2,839	3.77	−7.91
Greens	Carey Harrison	1,712	2.27	+2.27
Indigenous Peoples	Wally McCarthy	905	1.20	+1.20
Total formal votes		75,372	97.57	−0.56
Informal votes		1,875	2.43	+0.56
Turnout		77,247	96.23	
Two-party-preferred result
Liberal	Bill Taylor	48,304	64.12	+1.69
Labor	Ray Webber	27,031	35.88	−1.69
Liberal hold		Swing	+1.69	

==== 1990 ====
1990 Australian federal election: Groom
Party	Candidate	Votes	%	±%
Liberal	Bill Taylor	29,041	40.8	+27.5
Labor	Stewart Scott-Irving	22,103	31.1	−1.3
National	Terry Day	11,664	16.4	−32.5
Democrats	Trevor Ives	8,319	11.7	+6.3
Total formal votes		71,127	98.1	
Informal votes		1,396	1.9	
Turnout		72,523	95.9	
Two-party-preferred result
Liberal	Bill Taylor	44,138	62.2	+1.9
Labor	Stewart Scott-Irving	26,880	37.8	−1.9
Liberal hold		Swing	+1.9	

=== Elections in the 1980s ===
==== 1988 by-election ====
1988 Groom by-election
Party	Candidate	Votes	%	±%
Liberal	Bill Taylor	20,651	33.3	+19.9
National	David Russell	17,814	28.8	−20.1
Labor	Linda Dwyer	14,973	24.2	−8.2
Independent	Vincent Burke	4,661	7.5	+7.5
Democrats	Mark Carew	3,474	5.6	+0.2
Independent	Peter Consandine	369	0.6	+0.6
Total formal votes		61,942	98.6	
Informal votes		889	1.4	
Turnout		62,831	88.0	
Two-party-preferred result
Liberal	Bill Taylor	38,651	62.4	+62.4
National	David Russell	23,271	37.6	−25.2
Liberal gain from National		Swing	+25.2	

==== 1987 ====
1987 Australian federal election: Groom
Party	Candidate	Votes	%	±%
National	Tom McVeigh	32,054	48.9	−7.1
Labor	Linda Dwyer	21,217	32.4	+0.9
Liberal	Alexander Munro	8,754	13.3	+4.4
Democrats	Mark Carew	3,556	5.4	+1.8
Total formal votes		65,581	97.1	
Informal votes		1,938	2.9	
Turnout		67,519	93.4	
Two-party-preferred result
National	Tom McVeigh	41,174	62.8	−3.1
Labor	Linda Dwyer	24,407	37.2	+3.1
National hold		Swing	−3.1	

==== 1984 ====
1984 Australian federal election: Groom
Party	Candidate	Votes	%	±%
National	Tom McVeigh	34,047	56.0	−4.9
Labor	Ronald Cullin	19,142	31.5	−1.9
Liberal	Alexander Munro	5,417	8.9	+8.9
Democrats	Raymond Dow	2,160	3.6	−2.1
Total formal votes		60,766	97.6	
Informal votes		2,389	2.4	
Turnout		63,155	94.4	
Two-party-preferred result
National	Tom McVeigh	40,052	65.9	+2.7
Labor	Ronald Cullin	20,714	34.1	−2.7
National notional hold		Swing	+2.7	
