= 2024 in Christmas Island =

- Decades: 2010s; 2020s
- See also: Other events of 2024; Timeline of Christmas Islander history

Events from 2024 in Christmas Island.

== Incumbents ==
- Administrative head: Farzian Zainal

== Events ==
- 19 February – The Christmas Island red crab migration happens, their first delayed migration in recorded history. The cause was attributed to “dry weather”.
