= List of museums in Christmas Island =

Museums on Christmas Island include:

- Administrator's House, Christmas Island
- The Chinese Cultural and Heritage Museum
