= 2020 in the Cocos (Keeling) Islands =

- Decades
- See also: Other events of 2020; Timeline of Cocossian Cocos Islandian history

Events from 2020 in Cocos (Keeling) Islands.

== Incumbents ==
- Administrative head: Natasha Griggs
- Leaders of the Shire Council: Aindil Minkom

== Events ==
Ongoing – COVID-19 pandemic in Oceania

- 3 February – A US$184 million contract is awarded by the government to renovate and repair the territory's runway.
