= Australian Indian Ocean Territories =

Australian administrative unit

- Administrative unit
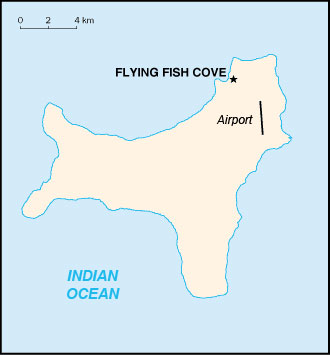
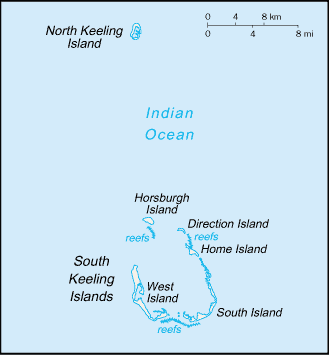
- Map of Christmas Island (left) and the Cocos (Keeling) Islands. Not to the same scale.
- Country: Australia
- Established: 1995

Government
  - Administrator: Farzian Zainal

Area
  - Total: 149 km^{2} (58 sq mi)

Population
  - Total: 2,387
  - Density: 16.0/km^{2} (41.5/sq mi)

The Australian Indian Ocean Territories is the name since 1995 of an administrative unit under the Australian Department of Infrastructure, Transport, Regional Development, Communications, Sport and the Arts, consisting of two island groups in the Indian Ocean under Australian sovereignty:

- Christmas Island (10.485°S 105.636°E), where the administrator resides
- Cocos (Keeling) Islands (12.158°S 96.870°E), where the same officer also has jurisdiction as administrator but does not reside

Each of these island components has its own shire council: the Shire of Christmas Island and the Shire of Cocos.

The administrative unit does not have jurisdiction over the uninhabited Ashmore and Cartier Islands and Heard Island and McDonald Islands, despite these territories lying within the Indian Ocean.

== Administration ==
=== Reviews ===
In 2004, a review of the territories was made.

In 2012, the administration was reviewed by Australian parliamentary visits and an enquiry.

Farzian Zainal is a community representative for, and the Treasurer of, the Indian Ocean Territories Regional Development Organisation, which is administered by the Australian government.

=== Administrators ===
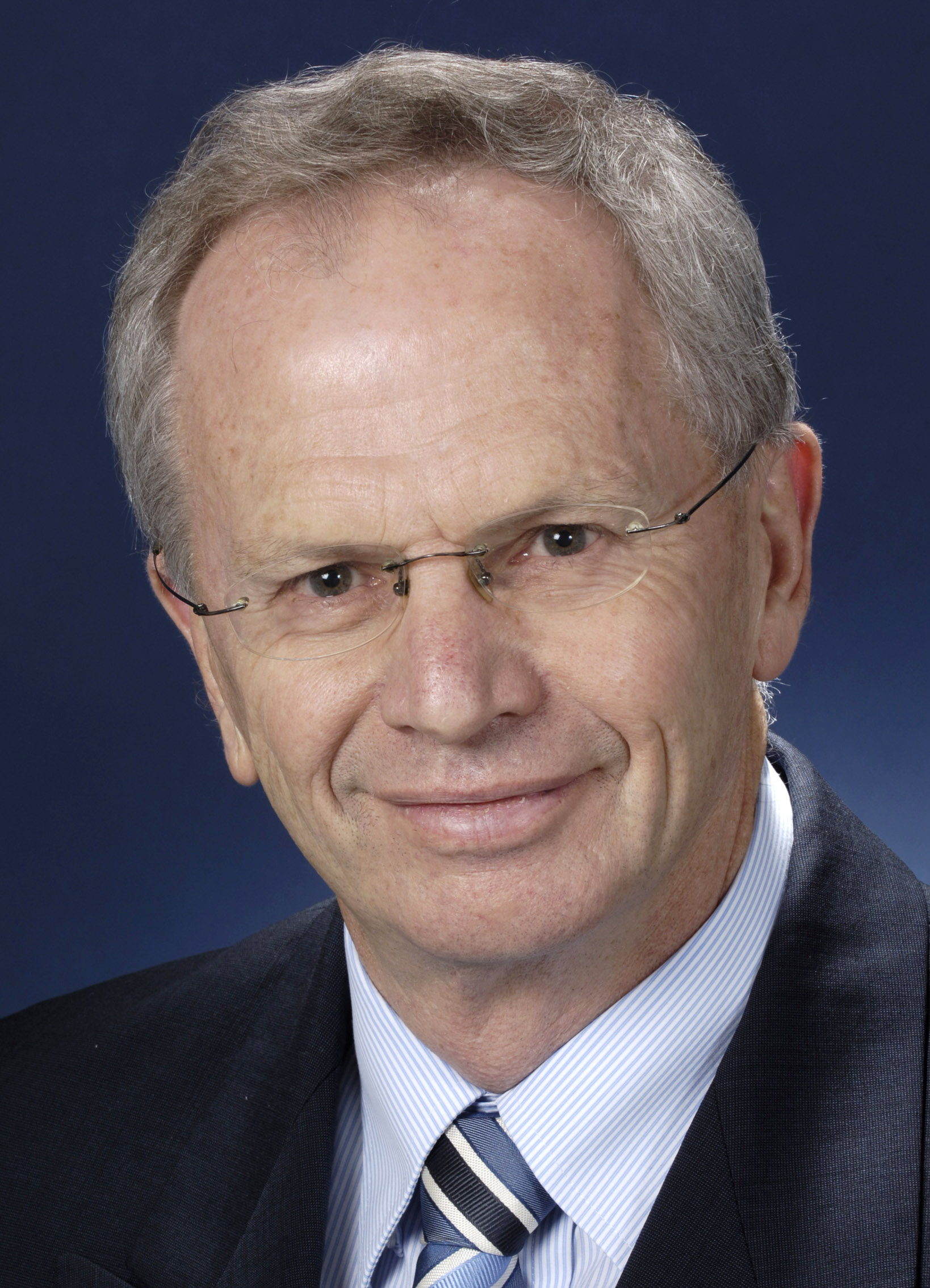
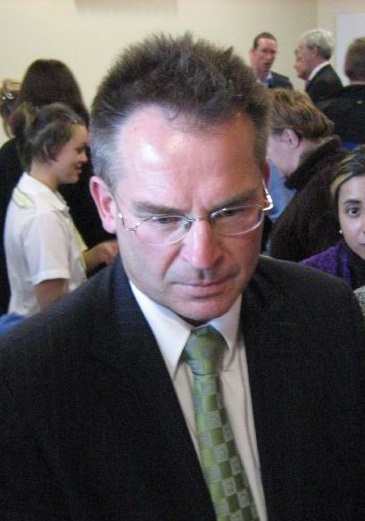
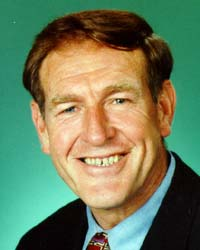
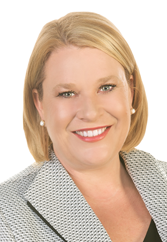
Notable past administrators, from left to right: Evan Williams, Jon Stanhope, Barry Haase, and Natasha Griggs

No.	Name	Political party	Took office	Left office
1	Danny Ambrose Gillespie	—N/a	1 July 1994	30 June 1996
2	Ron Harvey	—N/a	1 October 1997	30 October 1998
3	Bill Taylor	Liberal	4 February 1999	30 July 2003
4	Evan Williams	—N/a	1 November 2003	31 October 2005
5	Neil Lucas	Liberal	30 January 2006	22 February 2008
6	Brian Lacy	—N/a	5 October 2009	5 October 2012
7	Jon Stanhope	Labor	5 October 2012	5 October 2014
8	Barry Haase	Liberal	6 October 2014	4 October 2017
9	Natasha Griggs	Liberal	5 October 2017	4 October 2022
–	Sarah Vandenbroek (acting)	—N/a	4 October 2022	18 June 2023
10	Farzian Zainal	—N/a	19 June 2023	
