= 2020 in Christmas Island =

- Decades: 2010s; 2020s
- See also: Other events of 2020; Timeline of Christmas Islander history

Events from 2020 in Christmas Island.

== Incumbents ==
- Administrative head: Natasha Griggs

== Events ==
Ongoing – COVID-19 pandemic in Oceania

- 17 February – After their repatriation from China to Christmas Island on a government-chartered evacuation flight on 3 February as a result of the pandemic, the first group of Australians left the island.
