= Lillian Oh =

Australian politician

Lillian Oh was the president of the Christmas Island Shire Council between 1993 and 1995.

== Career ==
Lillian Oh first moved to Christmas Island to help the Union of Christmas Island Workers to establish a worker-led co-operative mining operation after the mine run by the Christmas Island Phosphate Mining Company was closed by the Australian Government. She was keen to ensure that the new mine was more environmentally friendly than the previous operation and later stated that "only under worker control did the mine start caring for the environment". Oh also assisted in the Christmas Island Rainforest Rehabilitation Program, a joint effort with the mine's previous owners and the Australian Nature Conservation Agency, that ran from 1989 to restore the natural habitat of the Abbott's booby and the Christmas Island red crab, which had been damaged by mining. In September 1992 Oh was elected general-secretary of the union.

Oh was elected president of the Christmas Island Shire Council, the island's local government body, in May 1993 and held that position until 1995. In March 1995 she raised the poor accommodation of asylum seekers on the island with the Australian government. Oh participated in the 1995 Commonwealth Grants Commission Christmas Island Inquiry into the quality of provision of public services on the island.
