= Kaye Bernard =

Australia activist

Kaye Bernard is an activist known for her work as a refugee advocate and labor leader on Australia's Christmas Island. She served as general secretary of the Union of Christmas Island Workers from 2010 to 2012.

== Work ==
Bernard first became involved with refugee issues on Christmas Island around 2003. Based in Perth, she began visiting the island to help those held at the major detention center there. Bernard went on to spend many years working to help support and release Southeast Asian refugee families being detained there. Her activism included campaigning, connecting refugees with legal services, visiting detainees, and writing about their situations in publications such as the Islander.

Bernard's increasing involvement with issues on Christmas Island led her, in November 2010, to become general secretary of the Union of Christmas Island Workers (UCIW), settling full time on the island. The union at the time was focused on representing the guards, cleaners, drivers, and administrative staff at the detention center, which at the time had a growing population of well over 2,000 detainees.

In 2011, as general secretary of the union, Bernard led criticism of overcrowding, understaffing, and lack of access to medical care for detainees at the center. She condemned privatization of the detention centers, which she argued had exacerbated poor conditions for both detainees and staff.

She continued to lead the UCIW until March 2012.
