= 2021 in Christmas Island =

- Decades: 2010s; 2020s
- See also: Other events of 2021; Timeline of Christmas Islander history

Events from 2021 in Christmas Island.

== Incumbents ==
- Administrative head: Natasha Griggs

== Events ==
Ongoing – COVID-19 pandemic in Oceania

- 22 March – A bacteria responsible for killing large numbers of the critically endangered Christmas Island chained gecko (Lepidodactylus listeri) is identified.
- 1 December– The annual Red crab migration closes roadways across Christmas Island.
