= 2022 in Christmas Island =

- Decades: 2010s; 2020s
- See also: Other events of 2022; Timeline of Christmas Islander history

Events from 2022 in Christmas Island.

== Incumbents ==
- Administrative head: Natasha Griggs (until 4 October), Sarah Vandenbroek (acting) (starting 4 October)

== Events ==
Ongoing – COVID-19 pandemic in Oceania; COVID-19 pandemic in Christmas Island

- 6 March – Christmas Island reports its first case of COVID-19, in a traveler from Australia.

== Weather ==
- 2021–22 Australian region cyclone season
  - Tropical Cyclone Paddy
