= Trade unions in Christmas Island =

International Labour Organization
- Christmas Island has separate territorial status but is an ILO member via Australia

Convention declaration
- Freedom of Association: 28 February 1973
- Right to Organise: 28 February 1973

In 1975 the first trade union formed in Christmas Island, a territory of Australia in the Indian Ocean, called the Union of Christmas Island Workers (UCIW) representing workers in the island's phosphate mines and administrative workers (other than police and teachers). During the 1970s and 1980s the UCIW secured wage parity with workers in Australia, rights to Australian citizenship for workers, democratic representation and local government, improved housing and community facilities and promoted community integration. The UCIW is affiliated to the Australian Council of Trade Unions (ACTU).
