= CI Resources =

Mining company

PRL Global Ltd
- Trade name: PRL Global Ltd
- Native name: PRL Global Ltd
- Formerly: CI Resources Limited
- Type: Public
- Traded as: ASX: PRG
- Industry: Mining
- Founded: 1987
- Headquarters: Registered office, Burswood, WA
- Area served: Australia, Malaysia, Indonesia, Singapore, Africa
- Key people: David Somerville - Chairman; Lai Ah Hong - Managing Director
- Products: Phosphate
- Revenue: 2014 - AUD $151 million
- Total equity: AUD $115 million
- Subsidiaries: Kemoil SA Liven Nutrients
- Website: prlgroup.com.au/investors/invest/

PRL Global Ltd, formerly known as CI Resources is an ASX listed company which operates the phosphate mine and provides services to the Immigration Reception and Processing Centre on Christmas Island.

The company was established in 1987. The company owned a 63-percent share of Phosphate Resources Ltd. It was reported earlier 2015 that CI Resources will buy out Phosphate Resources, which has operated the mine on Christmas Island since 1990.
