= Southeast Asia Treaty Organization =

Collective defense organization (1955–1977)

- SEATO's flag

- Map of SEATO members in 1959, shown in blue.
- Abbreviation: SEATO
- Formation: 8 September 1954
- Dissolved: 30 June 1977
- Type: Intergovernmental military alliance
- Headquarters: Bangkok, Thailand
- Region served: Southeast Asia
- Members: 8 states: Australia; France; New Zealand; Pakistan; Philippines; Thailand; United Kingdom; United States; Non-members protected by SEATO 3 states: Cambodia (until 1956, 1968–1970) Khmer Republic (1970–1975); Laos (until 1975); South Vietnam (until 1975)
- Official languages: 6 languages: English; Urdu; Thai; Filipino; Spanish; French

The Southeast Asia Treaty Organization (SEATO) was an international organization for collective defense in Southeast Asia created by the Southeast Asia Collective Defense Treaty signed in September 1954 in Manila, Philippines. The formal institution of SEATO was established on 19 February 1955 at a meeting of treaty partners in Bangkok, Thailand. The organization's headquarters was also in Bangkok. A total of eight members joined the organization in its lifetime.

Primarily created to block further communist gains in Southeast Asia, SEATO is generally considered a failure, as internal conflict and dispute hindered general use of the SEATO military; however, SEATO-funded cultural and educational programs left longstanding effects in Southeast Asia. SEATO was dissolved on 30 June 1977, after many of its members lost interest and withdrew.

== Origins and structure ==
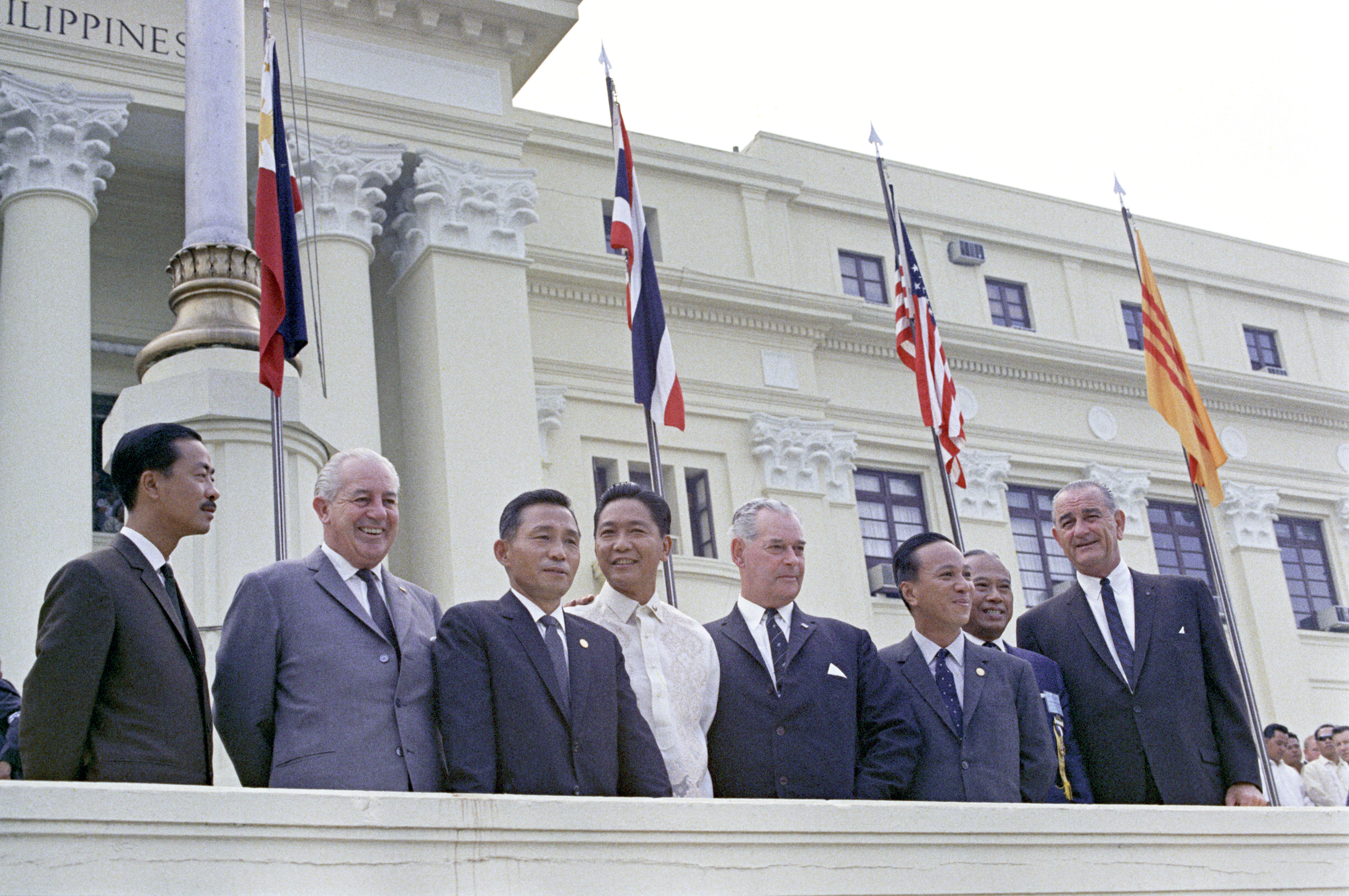
The leaders of several SEATO countries in front of the Congress Building in Manila, hosted by Philippine President Ferdinand Marcos on 24 October 1966

The Southeast Asia Collective Defense Treaty ( SEACDT ) was signed on 8 September 1954 in Manila, as part of the American Truman Doctrine of creating anti-communist bilateral and collective defense treaties. These treaties and agreements were intended to create alliances that would keep communist powers in check (Communist China, in SEATO's case). This policy was considered to have been largely developed by American diplomat George F. Kennan. President Dwight D. Eisenhower's Secretary of State John Foster Dulles (1953–1959) is considered to be the primary force behind the creation of SEATO, which expanded the concept of anti-communist collective defense to Southeast Asia. Vice President Richard Nixon advocated an Asian equivalent of the North Atlantic Treaty Organization (NATO) upon returning from his Asia trip of late 1953, and NATO was the model for the new organization, with the military forces of each member intended to be coordinated to provide for the collective defense of the member states.

The organization, headquartered in Bangkok, was created in 1955 at the first meeting of the Council of Ministers set up by the treaty. This was contrary to Dulles's preference to call the organization "ManPac" (Manila Pact) to avoid public identification of the pact with NATO. Organizationally, SEATO was headed by the Secretary General, whose office was created in 1957 at a meeting in Canberra, with a council of representatives from member states and an international staff. Also present were committees for economics, security, and information. SEATO's first Secretary General was Pote Sarasin, a Thai diplomat and politician who had served as Thailand's ambassador to the U.S. between 1952 and 1957, and as Prime Minister of Thailand from September 1957 to 1 January 1958.

Unlike the NATO alliance, SEATO had no joint commands with standing forces. In addition, SEATO's response protocol in the event of communism presenting a "common danger" to the member states was vague and ineffective, though membership in the SEATO alliance did provide a rationale for a large-scale U.S. military intervention in the region during the Vietnam War (1955–1975).

== Membership ==
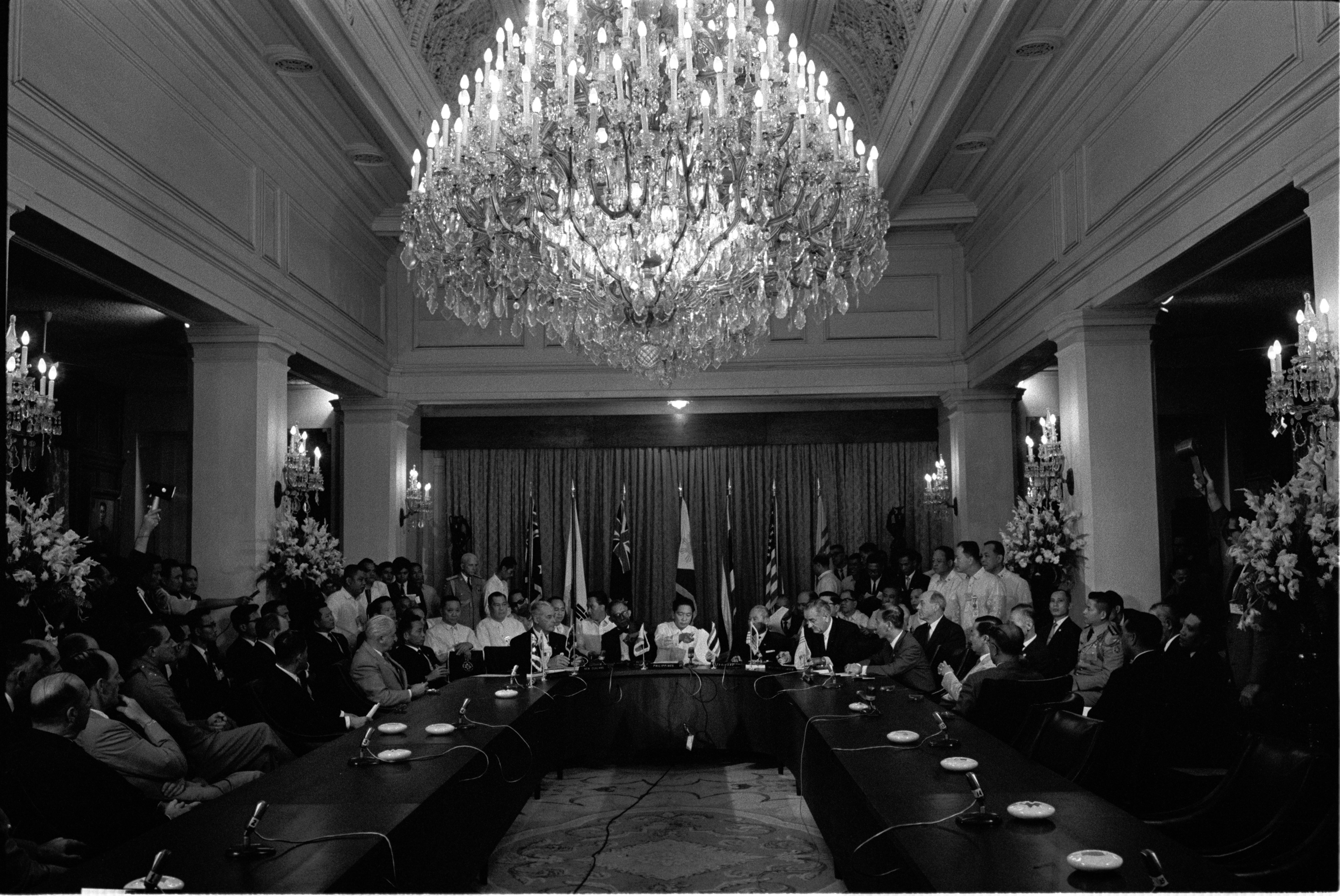
1966 SEATO conference in Manila

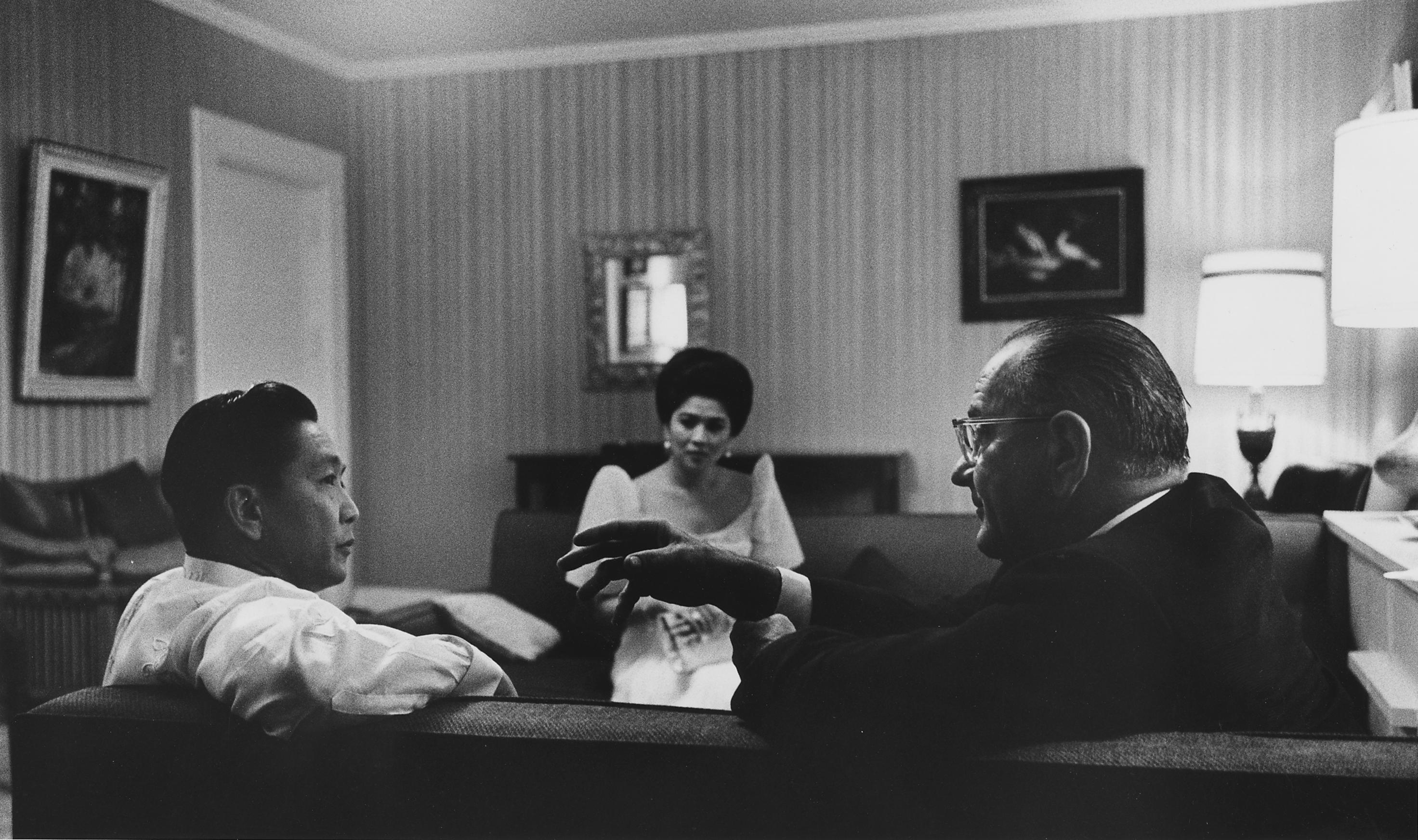
Philippine President Ferdinand Marcos, First Lady Imelda Marcos, and US President Lyndon Johnson conversing at the Manila Conference of SEATO members on the Vietnam War in Manila in October 1966

Despite its name, SEATO mostly included countries located outside of the region but with an interest either in the region or the organization itself. They were Australia (which administered Papua New Guinea, until 1975), France (which had recently relinquished French Indochina, by 1955), New Zealand, Pakistan (which, until 1971, included East Pakistan, now Bangladesh), the Philippines, Thailand, the United Kingdom (which administered Hong Kong, North Borneo and Sarawak) and the United States.

The Philippines and Thailand were the only Southeast Asian countries that actually participated in the organization. They shared close ties with the United States, particularly the Philippines, and they faced incipient communist insurgencies against their own governments. Thailand became a member upon the discovery of the newly founded "Thai Autonomous Region" in Yunnan (the Xishuangbanna Dai Autonomous Prefecture in Southwest China) – apparently feeling threatened by potential Maoist subversion on its land. Other regional countries like Burma and Indonesia were far more mindful of domestic internal stability rather than any communist threat, and thus rejected joining it. Malaya (independence in 1957; including Singapore between 1963 and 1965) also chose not to participate formally, though it was kept updated with key developments due to its close relationship with the United Kingdom.

Following their newly affirmed independence from French Indochina, the states of North Vietnam, South Vietnam, Cambodia, and Laos were barred from joining any international military alliance as a result of the Geneva Agreements, signed on July 21, 1954, which brought an end to the First Indochina War. However, with the lingering threat coming from communist North Vietnam and the possibility of the domino theory with Indochina turning into a communist frontier, SEATO got these countries under its protection – an act that would be considered to be one of the main justifications for the U.S. involvement in the Vietnam War. Cambodia, however rejected the protection in 1956.

The majority of SEATO members were not located in Southeast Asia. To Australia and New Zealand, SEATO was seen as a more satisfying organization than ANZUS – a collective defense organization with the U.S. The United Kingdom and France joined partly due to having long maintained colonies in the region, and partly due to concerns over developments in Indochina. The U.S., upon perceiving Southeast Asia to be a pivotal frontier for Cold War geopolitics, saw the establishment of SEATO as essential to its Cold War containment policy.

The membership reflected a mid-1950s combination of anti-communist Western states and such states in Southeast Asia. The United Kingdom, France and the United States, the latter of which joined after the U.S. Senate ratified the treaty by an 82–1 vote, represented the strongest Western powers. Canada also considered joining, but decided against it in order to concentrate on its NATO responsibilities with its limited defense capabilities.

=== Budget ===
Average of contributions to civil and military budgets between 1958 and 1973:

- United States: 24%
- United Kingdom: 16%
- France: 13.5%
- Australia: 13.5%
- Pakistan: 8%
- Philippines: 8%
- Thailand: 8%
- New Zealand: 8%

=== Secretaries-General ===
Secretaries-General of SEATO:

Name	Country	From	To
Pote Sarasin	Thailand	5 September 1957	22 September 1958
William Worth (acting)	Australia	22 September 1958	10 January 1958
Pote Sarasin	Thailand	10 January 1958	13 December 1963
William Worth (acting)	Australia	13 December 1963	19 February 1964
Konthi Suphamongkhon	Thailand	19 February 1964	1 July 1965
Jesus M. Vargas	Philippines	1 July 1965	5 September 1972
Sunthorn Hongladarom	Thailand	5 September 1972	30 June 1977

== Military aspects ==
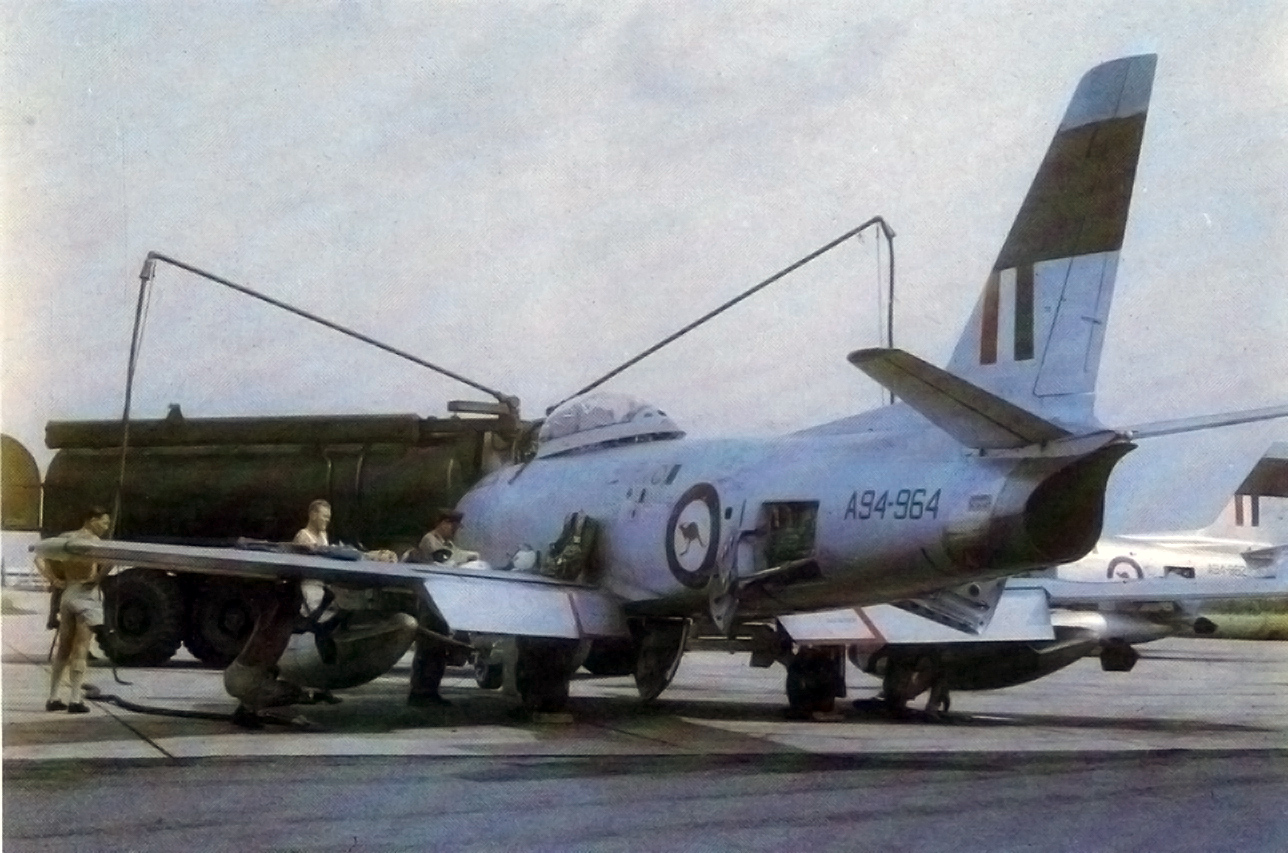
Australian No. 79 Squadron Sabres at Ubon Royal Thai Air Force Base in Thailand, deployed as part of Australia's commitment to SEATO

After its creation, SEATO quickly became insignificant militarily, as most of its member nations contributed very little to the alliance. While SEATO military forces held joint military training, they were never deployed because of internal disagreements. SEATO was unable to intervene in conflicts in Laos because France and the United Kingdom rejected the use of military action. As a result, the U.S. provided unilateral support for Laos after 1962. Though sought by the U.S., involvement of SEATO in the Vietnam War was denied due to a lack of British and French cooperation.

Both the United States and Australia cited the alliance as justification for involvement in Vietnam. U.S. membership in SEATO provided the United States with a rationale for a large-scale U.S. military intervention in Southeast Asia. Other countries, such as the UK and key states in Asia, accepted the rationale. In 1962, as part of its commitment to SEATO, the Royal Australian Air Force deployed CAC Sabres of its No. 79 Squadron to Ubon Royal Thai Air Force Base, Thailand. The Sabres began to play a role in the Vietnam War in 1965, when their air defense responsibilities expanded to include protection of USAF aircraft using Ubon as a base for strikes against North Vietnam.

== Cultural effects ==
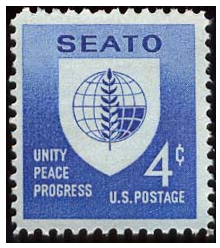
A 1960 U.S. postage stamp for SEATO

In addition to joint military training, SEATO member states worked on improving mutual social and economic issues. Such activities were overseen by SEATO's Committee of Information, Culture, Education, and Labor Activities, and proved to be some of SEATO's greatest successes. In 1959, SEATO's first Secretary General, Pote Sarasin, created the SEATO Graduate School of Engineering (currently the Asian Institute of Technology) in Thailand to train engineers. SEATO also sponsored the creation of the Teacher Development Center in Bangkok, as well as the Thai Military Technical Training School, which offered technical programs for supervisors and workmen. SEATO's Skilled Labor Project (SLP) created artisan training facilities, especially in Thailand, where ninety-one training workshops were established.

SEATO also provided research funding and grants in agriculture and medical fields. In 1959, SEATO set up the Cholera Research Laboratory in Bangkok, later establishing a second Cholera Research Laboratory in Dacca, East Pakistan. The Dacca (now Dhaka) laboratory soon became the world's leading cholera research facility and was later renamed the International Centre for Diarrhoeal Disease Research, Bangladesh. SEATO was also interested in literature, and a SEATO Literature Award was created and given to writers from member states.

== Criticism and dissolution ==
Though Secretary of State John Foster Dulles considered SEATO an essential element in U.S. foreign policy in Asia, many historians have considered the pact a failure. In The Geneva Conference of 1954 on Indochina, Sir James Cable, a British diplomat and naval strategist, cabled the Foreign Office and described SEATO as "a fig leaf for the nakedness of American policy", citing the Manila Pact as a "zoo of paper tigers". As early as the 1950s Aneurin Bevan unsuccessfully tried to block SEATO in the British Parliament, at one point interrupting a parliamentary debate between Foreign Secretary Anthony Eden and Leader of the Opposition Clement Attlee to excoriate them both for considering the idea.

Prince Norodom Sihanouk of Cambodia reported that Foster Dulles went to great efforts to convince him to join SEATO; however, he refused because "I considered SEATO an aggressive military alliance directed against neighbors whose ideology I did not share but with whom Cambodia had no quarrel". In the early 1970s, the question of dissolving the organization arose. Pakistan withdrew in 1973, after East Pakistan seceded and became Bangladesh on 16 December 1971. South Vietnam was defeated in war and annexed by North Vietnam and France withdrew financial support in 1975, and the SEATO council agreed to the phasing-out of the organization. After a final exercise on 20 February 1976, the organization was formally dissolved on 30 June 1977 during the Carter administration.

== See also ==
- Central Treaty Organization
