= Abu Quassey =

Egyptian smuggler

Mootaz Attia Mohamed Hasan, better known as Abu Quassey (born 20 March 1973) is a convicted people smuggler and the head of the syndicate that organised the fatal SIEV X voyage.

Born in Egypt, Quassey became involved in people smuggling in Indonesia in the late 1990s. Quassey started out as a junior associate of Ahmed Aloung (known as 'Ahmed the Indonesian'), one of the principals of the largest people-smuggling syndicate operating in Indonesia in the late 1990s.
