= William Worth (diplomat) =

Australian diplomat (born 1912)

William Worth OBE (born 13 December 1912, date of death unknown) was an Australian diplomat who served two terms as the acting secretary general of the Southeast Asia Treaty Organization (SEATO).

== Early life and career ==
William Worth was born in Perth, Western Australia on 13 December 1912. He later moved to Adelaide, South Australia, where he enlisted in the Royal Australian Air Force on 18 June 1940. Achieving the rank of Flight Lieutenant, Worth served in the RAAF until 1951. During World War II Worth was on the air staff of the Supreme Headquarters Allied Expeditionary Force and played a part in the invasion of France in 1944. He later rose to the office of Deputy Director of Intelligence for the RAAF.

On leaving the RAAF he joined the Australian Department of Supply in which he was responsible for security. Prior to leaving for Bangkok to take up an appointment as Deputy Secretary-General of SEATO, Worth served as Assistant Secretary in the Prime Minister's Department in Canberra.

== Diplomatic career ==
In September 1957, Worth was appointed the first Deputy Secretary-General of SEATO and took over as acting Secretary General when Pote Sarasin took office as Prime Minister of Thailand on 22 September 1957. With the return of Sarasin on 10 January 1958, Worth continued as Deputy Secretary General.

On 13 December 1963, he again became acting secretary general of SEATO, after Secretary General Sarasin had resigned after his appointment as Minister for National Development in Thailand. Worth continued until the substantive appointment of Konthi Suphamongkhon on 19 February 1964.

From 1 November 1975 to 31 October 1977, Worth was appointed Administrator of the Australian Christmas Island Territory. In the 1977 Silver Jubilee and Birthday Honours, Worth was appointed an Officer of the Order of the British Empire (OBE) for public service on Christmas Island.

Diplomatic posts
New title	Deputy Secretary-General of SEATO; 1957 – 1970	Succeeded by Robert Hyslop
Preceded by Pote Sarasin	acting Secretary-General of SEATO; 1957 – 1958	Succeeded by Pote Sarasin
Preceded by Pote Sarasin	acting Secretary-General of SEATO; 1963 – 1964	Succeeded by Konthi Suphamongkhon
Government offices
Preceded by Harry Webb	Administrator of the Christmas Island Territory; 1975 – 1977	Succeeded by F. C. Boyle
