= Gordon Bennett (union organiser) =

English-born labor advocate on Christmas Island

Gordon Bennett (known locally as Tai Ko Seng [Big Brother Who Delivers]) (1944–1991) was an English-born labor advocate on Christmas Island. Bennet arrived on the island in 1979 to take a post as leader of the Union of Christmas Island Workers, where he worked for the wage and safety rights of marginalized Chinese and Malay laborers on the island.

Bennet died in 1991, and was buried in the island's Chinese cemetery, where his grave became a site of reverence, with offerings of liquor and cigarettes left for him by the island's Chinese and Malay residents.

== Filmography ==
- Big Brother of Christmas Island, 1999
