= SIEV X =

Indonesian illegal immigrant boat to Australia; sank in international waters (2001)

Coordinates: 10.1695°S 106.2291°E

SIEV X was the name assigned by Australian authorities to an Indonesian fishing boat carrying over 400 asylum seekers en route to Australia, which capsized in international waters with great loss of life on 19 October 2001. SIEV stands for Suspected Irregular Entry Vessel and is the acronym used by the surveillance authority for any boat that has entered Australian waters without prior authorisation. The X is a designation used where a tracking number has not yet been assigned, in accordance with Australian Government orders.

The dilapidated Indonesian fishing boat was en route from Sumatra to Christmas Island carrying over 400 asylum seekers. It sank just south of the Indonesian island of Java, killing 353 people, mainly women and children. The tragedy was politically controversial in Australia, as it occurred during an election campaign at a time when asylum seekers and border protection were major issues.

== Background ==
The SIEV-X incident occurred during the 2001 Australian Federal election campaign. The Tampa affair had focused national media's attention on the issue of asylum seekers. Prime Minister John Howard said his policy would prevent people smuggling and stop the boats of asylum seekers from arriving in Australia. The Howard government had issued instructions to the Royal Australian Navy and the Australian Federal Police (AFP) to prevent any refugees from reaching Australia via boat. The AFP set about a campaign of disrupting organised people smugglers who operated with overcrowded and dangerous boats. The Royal Australian Navy began intercepting boats that entered Australian waters and transferring all people to Christmas Island.

== Sinking ==
On 18 October 2001, a small, unnamed 19.5 metre by 4 metre Indonesian fishing boat departed Bandar Lampung, Indonesia, with 421 passengers on board. On the 19th, the boat sank during a storm in Indonesian waters about 70 km south of Java. The area was legally in international waters but within both Indonesia's Exclusive Economic Zone (EEZ) and Indonesia's internationally designated zone of search and rescue responsibility. It also fell inside a temporary Australian border protection surveillance area around the Australian external territory of Christmas Island (which is some 1700 km from mainland Australia). This latter designation was an internal planning and operational tool used by the Australian authorities to deter people smuggling. It had no legal validity and conferred no responsibility in international law.

Approximately 146 children, 142 women and 65 men died. On 20 October, 44 survivors were rescued by an Indonesian fishing boat, the Indah Jaya Makmur. A 45th survivor was rescued about twelve hours later by another boat, the Surya Terang.

The International Organization for Migration stated that it had expected such an event to occur due to "the way the people smugglers pack these boats".

== Senate Select Committee ==
On 20 February 2002, the Australian Senate Select Committee inquiring into 'A Certain Maritime Incident' met for the first time. Its primary task was to investigate the children overboard affair, however its terms of reference also included investigating "operational procedures observed by the Royal Australian Navy and by relevant Commonwealth agencies to ensure the safety of asylum seekers on vessels entering or attempting to enter Australian waters".

The committee investigated the SIEV-X sinking, and concluded that "... it [is] extraordinary that a major human disaster could occur in the vicinity of a theatre of intensive Australian operations and remain undetected until three days after the event, without any concern being raised within intelligence and decision making circles." While no government department was found to be to blame for the tragedy, the committee was surprised that there had been no internal investigations into any systemic problems which could have allowed the Australian government to prevent it from occurring."

== SIEV X Memorials ==
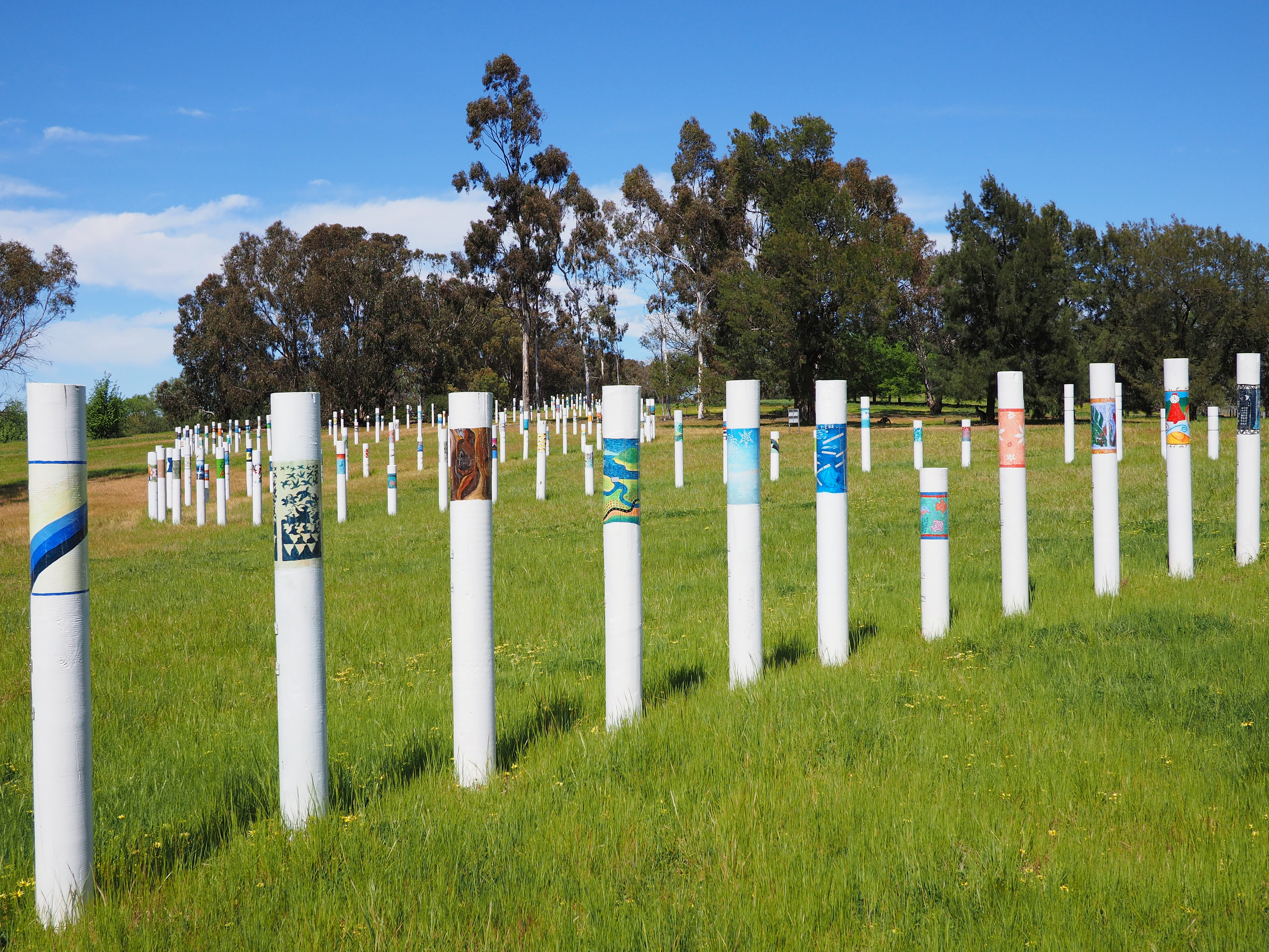
Part of the SIEV X Memorial

Detail from one of the 353 memorial poles, by Ebru Agim, Ashley Banach and Amie Lozenkovski of Keira High School, Wollongong

=== Canberra ===
Since 2003, Steve Biddulph worked with the Uniting Church in Australia to build a suitable memorial for victims and survivors of the SIEV X sinking. On Sunday, 15 September 2006, a 'temporary' memorial was erected at Weston Park in Canberra. The memorial, designed by Mitchell Donaldson of Queensland's Hillbrook Anglican School, consisted of 353 white poles, all decorated by schools, churches and community groups across Australia. While the ACT Government was supportive of the memorial, with Chief Minister Jon Stanhope opening the memorial, the then Howard government tried to stop the memorial being constructed. The National Capital Authority claimed that it was not an approved structure.

The permanent memorial, involving over a thousand student and community artists, was dedicated in October 2007.

=== Melbourne ===
A memorial of three pole of different heights - representing all the children, women, and men who died - stands at Manningham Uniting Church in Templestowe.

=== Christmas Island ===
A memorial to the disaster is in the precinct of the Administrator's House on Christmas Island.

== See also ==
- Suspected Illegal Entry Vessel
- Abu Quassey
