= Union of Christmas Island Workers =

Trade union in Christmas Island

UCIW
- Union of Christmas Island Workers
- Founded: 1974
- Headquarters: Christmas Island
- Location: Australia
- Members: ▼202 (as at 31 December 2024)
- Key people: Foo Kee Heng, president Gordon Thomson, general secretary
- Affiliations: ACTU

The Union of Christmas Island Workers (UCIW) is a trade union in Christmas Island, the non self-governing territory of Australia. It represents workers on the island, and is affiliated with the Australian Council of Trade Unions.

== History ==
The Union was formed in March 1974 in response to the British Phosphate Commission's (BPC) firing and deportation of Teo Boon How, the chief interpreter in the administrative office. On 27 March 1974, over 1100 workers on the island went on strike, eventually forcing the BPC to reinstate him.

The next year, the Union took on a more formal structure, with schoolteacher and former teachers' union organiser Michael Grimes being elected as its first general secretary and Lim Sai Meng being elected as its first president.

In 1978, Grimes was replaced by the more militant Gordon Bennett. After Bennett's election, the Union issued a series of demands, including a $30-per-week pay raise and Australian citizenship rights for Christmas Islanders.

In 1979, the Union would launch another strike, with almost the entire workforce of the island participating. After the BPC attempted to break the strike, the deputy president of Australia's arbitration commission James Taylor travelled to the Island to intervene. However, Taylor's intervention sided with the BPC, retroactively granting them permission to make illegal reprisals against the striking workers. The intervention had the effect of inflaming tensions even further, with transport workers preventing Taylor from leaving the Island. The Union later began taking actions on the Australian mainland, including protesting outside Parliament House and launching a hunger strike. Eventually, the Union's strike was successful, not only winning the demanded pay raise but also convincing the government of Australia to launch a public inquiry into the BPC.

In 1981, the British Phosphate Commission was disbanded, mining on the Island being taken over by the Phosphate Mining Company of Christmas Island, an Australian crown corporation.

In 1987, the Australian government closed the Island's phosphate mine. In response, the Union purchased the mine and was able to re-open it in 1990. Lillian Oh was elected secretary-general in September 1992.

In more recent decades, the union represented workers at the island's immigration detention center. In this period, Gordon Thomson has served several terms as general secretary, including from 2012–present, as well as Kaye Bernard, who served as general secretary from 2010 to 2012.
