= 1988 Groom by-election =

1988 Australian by-election

- 9 April 1988

	First party	Second party	Third party
Candidate	Bill Taylor	David Russell	Linda Dwyer
Party	Liberal	National	Labor
Popular vote	20,651	17,814	14,973
Percentage	33.3%	28.8%	24.2%
Swing	▲19.9	▼20.1	▼8.2
TCP	62.4%	37.6%
TCP swing	▲62.4	▼25.2
MP before election
Tom McVeigh
National
Elected MP
Bill Taylor
Liberal

A by-election was held for the Australian House of Representatives seat of Groom on 9 April 1988. It was triggered by the resignation of National Party MP Tom McVeigh.

The by-election was won by Liberal Party candidate Bill Taylor.

A month before the poll, Taylor was publicly backed by former Queensland premier Sir Joh Bjelke-Petersen, who had been forced to resign as premier several months earlier, after losing the support of his National Party colleagues. Bjelke-Petersen said the Nationals had lost their way and turned their backs on traditional conservative policies.

== Candidates ==
- Australian Democrats – Mark Carew, the party's 1987 candidate.
- Australian Labor Party – Linda Dwyer, the party's 1987 candidate.
- Liberal Party of Australia – Bill Taylor, an officer in the Royal Australian Navy.
- National Party of Australia – David Russell.
- Independent – Peter Consandine, republican campaigner who later founded the Republican Party of Australia.
- Independent – Vincent Burke. Burke later contested the Australian Senate as an ungrouped independent in 1990.

== Results ==
Groom by-election, 1988
Party	Candidate	Votes	%	±%
Liberal	Bill Taylor	20,651	33.3	+19.9
National	David Russell	17,814	28.8	−20.1
Labor	Linda Dwyer	14,973	24.2	−8.2
Independent	Vincent Burke	4,661	7.5	+7.5
Democrats	Mark Carew	3,474	5.6	+0.2
Independent	Peter Consandine	369	0.6	+0.6
Total formal votes		61,942	98.6	
Informal votes		889	1.4	
Turnout		62,831	88.0	
Two-party-preferred result
Liberal	Bill Taylor	38,651	62.4	+62.4
National	David Russell	23,271	37.6	−25.2
Liberal gain from National		Swing	N/A	

== See also ==
- List of Australian federal by-elections
