= Tom McVeigh =

Australian politician (born 1930)

The Honourable Tom McVeigh
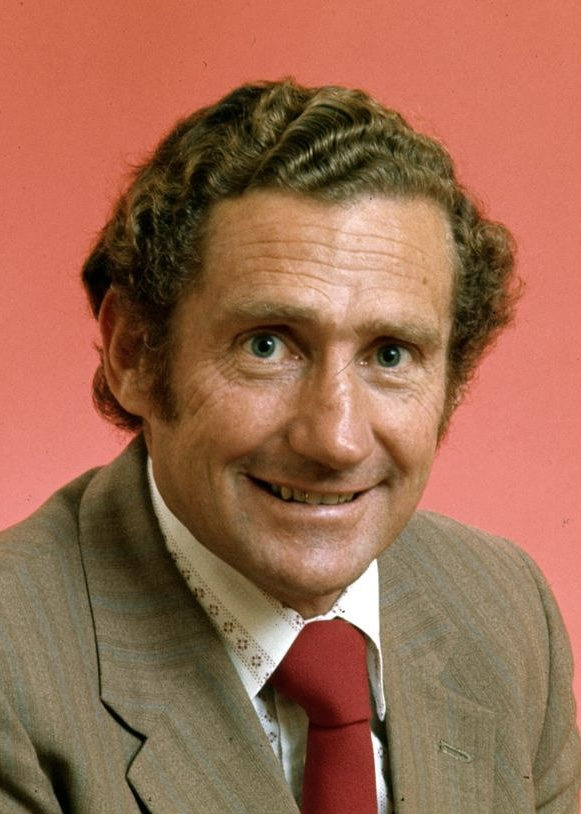
- McVeigh in 1974

Minister for Home Affairs and the Environment
- In office 7 May 1982 – 11 March 1983
- Prime Minister: Malcolm Fraser
- Preceded by: Ian Wilson
- Succeeded by: Barry Cohen

Minister for Housing and Construction
- In office 3 November 1980 – 7 May 1982
- Prime Minister: Malcolm Fraser
- Preceded by: Ray Groom
- Succeeded by: Position abolished

Member of the Australian Parliament for Groom
- In office 1 December 1984 – 29 February 1988
- Preceded by: New seat
- Succeeded by: Bill Taylor

Member of the Australian Parliament for Darling Downs
- In office 2 December 1972 – 1 December 1984
- Preceded by: Reginald Swartz
- Succeeded by: Division abolished

Personal details
- Born: 7 May 1930 (age 96) Allora, Queensland, Australia
- Party: National
- Children: John McVeigh (son)
- Occupation: Farmer

Daniel Thomas McVeigh (born 7 May 1930) is a former Australian politician. He served in the House of Representatives from 1972 to 1988, representing the National Party (previously the National Country Party). He held ministerial office in the Fraser government, serving as Minister for Housing and Construction (1980–1982) and Minister for Home Affairs and the Environment (1982–1983).

== Early life ==
McVeigh was born on 7 May 1930 in Allora, Queensland. In 1941, aged 11, he was tasked with welcoming Prime Minister Arthur Fadden to his school and promised to succeed him in the seat of Darling Downs. McVeigh later attended boarding school in Brisbane. He became a "third-generation Darling Downs primary producer and a prize-winning wheat farmer", on a property of 1,200 acres (490 ha). He also played in the A-grade of the Darling Downs Rugby Union as a half-back. He served on the council of the Queensland Graingrowers' Association (1963–1966), as a Queensland delegate to the Australian Wheatgrowers' Federation (1964–1966), and on the Queensland State Wheat Board (1965–1974).

== Politics ==
McVeigh won the seat of Darling Downs for the National Country Party at the 1972 election. He was appointed Minister for Housing and Construction in the Fraser government in November 1980. In May 1982, he was moved to the portfolio of Minister for Home Affairs and the Environment and held that position to the defeat of the government at the 1983 election. In 1984, with the abolition of the seat of Darling Downs, McVeigh followed most of his constituents into the new Division of Groom, which he held until his resignation in February 1988.

McVeigh aligned himself with Queensland premier Joh Bjelke-Petersen's "Joh for Canberra" campaign in 1987, which sparked a fracture in the Nationals between Queensland MPs seeking an independent National Party and supporters of federal leader Ian Sinclair and the existing coalition with the Liberals. He was the first Nationals MP to withdraw from the Coalition, doing so at a party meeting on 17 March. McVeigh nonetheless remained a Nationals frontbencher during this time, serving as the party's spokesman on Aboriginal affairs. He eventually rejoined the Coalition on 11 August.

In December 1987, it was reported that the Queensland state government had nominated McVeigh to serve as agent-general in London. He formally resigned from parliament on 29 February 1988, sparking a by-election in Groom.

== Family ==
His son, John, served in the Queensland Legislative Assembly for Toowoomba South from 2012 to 2016 before winning Tom's old federal seat of Groom in 2016.

== See also ==
- Political families of Australia

== Notes ==
Political offices
Preceded by Ray Groom	Minister for Housing and Construction; 1980–1982	Succeeded by Ralph Hunt (construction)
Preceded by Ian Wilson	Minister for Home Affairs and the Environment; 1982–1983	Succeeded by Barry Cohen
Parliament of Australia
Preceded by Reginald Swartz	Member for Darling Downs; 1972–1984	Division abolished
New division	Member for Groom; 1984–1988	Succeeded by Bill Taylor
