= Administrator's House =

Residence and museum in Christmas Island, Australia

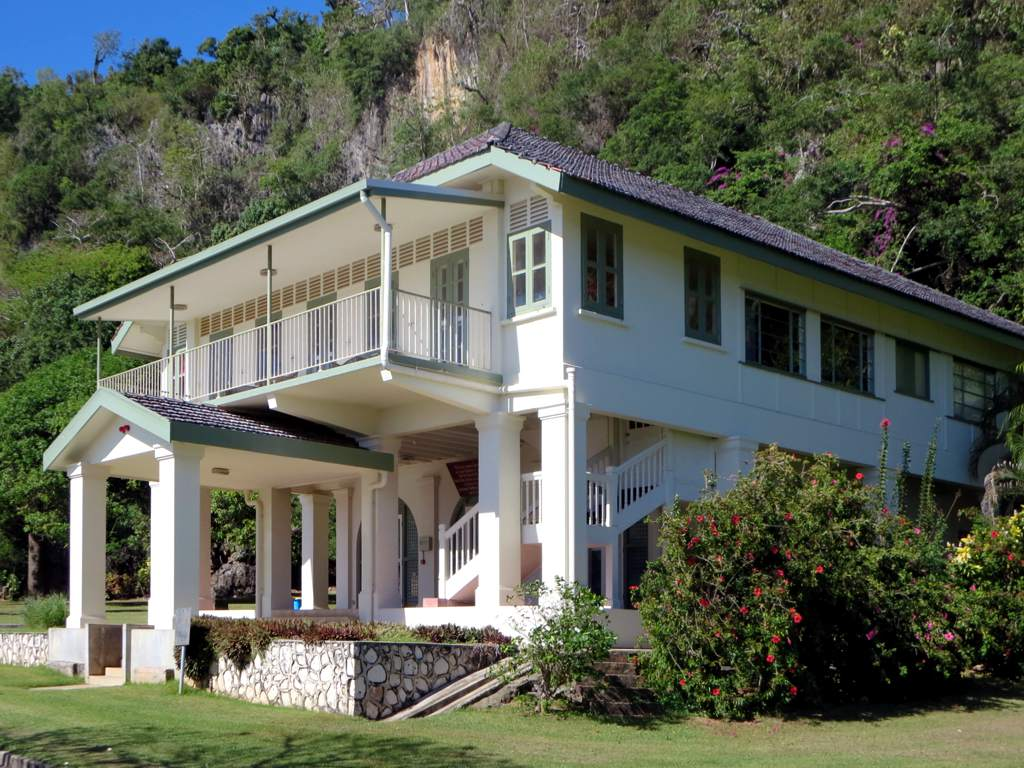

- Location within Earth
- Location on Christmas Island
- Alternative names: Tai Jin House

General information
- Status: Completed
- Type: Museum; Former official residence
- Location: 1.5 kilometres (0.93 mi) south west of Flying Fish Cove, Christmas Island, Smith's Point Road Christmas Island Australia, Australia
- Coordinates: 10.4287°S 105.6651°E
- Renovated: 1965

Technical details
- Floor count: 2

Commonwealth Heritage List
- Official name: Administrators House Precinct
- Type: Listed place (Historic)
- Designated: 22 June 2004
- Reference no.: 105337

The Administrator's House is a heritage-listed former official residence and now museum located 1.5 kilometres (0.93 mi) south-west of Flying Fish Cove in the Australian territory of Christmas Island. It was added to the Australian Commonwealth Heritage List on 22 June 2004. It is also known as Tai Jin House. The house served as the official residence for the Administrator of Christmas Island.

== Description ==
The Administrator's House is a substantial, two story residence, with a semi-detached service and servants wing, surrounded by a well developed garden. The residence is sited in a prominent location looking across Flying Fish Cove and can be seen from various vantage points on the higher terraces. The style and location of the residence appears to have been designed to emphasise the eminence of the Administrator. In 1965 the ground floor exterior doorways which had timber arches and lattice work infill were altered, the arches were bricked and the lattice work replaced by glass with etched patterns resembling the earlier lattice work. A portico was also added with a balcony above it. Upstairs windows, which were wood shuttered, were glazed.

Immediately to the north of the Administrator's House stand a number of ammunition bunkers and a gun emplacement which still contains a six-inch (fifteen-centimetre) naval gun. The complex also contains accommodation and support buildings including a jail. On the cliff, approximately 10 metres (33 ft) above the gun, is an observation post and ranging station. The ruins of a Japanese washhouse is reported to be beyond the gun emplacement. The gun emplacement was built before World War II for the installation of the 6inch naval gun and a detachment of troops was stationed there. In March 1942 the detachment mutinied on the eve of the Japanese occupation of the island and several officers were killed. The occupying Japanese later took control of the site for the duration of the war.

The wider house precinct, including the former ammunition bunkers, gun emplacement and observation post and ranging station just to the north of the house, are also included in the heritage listing.

== Condition ==
The Administrator's House was extensively remodelled in 1965 although the service area is little altered from its original form. The gun emplacement complex is intact despite the post war conversion of the ammunition bunkers to provide servants' quarters and other support functions for the Administrator's House.

== Heritage listing ==
The Administrators House Precinct was listed on the Australian Commonwealth Heritage List on 22 June 2004.

The Administrator's House is a historic reminder and symbol of colonial rule of Christmas Island, when it was incorporated into the Straits Settlement of Singapore and has been the focus for official duties and functions. The imposing scale of the residence and its location in a prominent position looking across Flying Fish Cove emphasises the previous social importance of the Administrator and provides an important visual focal point from several other parts of the settlement. The gun emplacement and ammunition bunkers have historical significance as a reminder of earlier military threats to the Island and through their direct association with the 1942 mutiny and the subsequent Japanese invasion of the Island.

== Museum ==
As of 2020, the house served as a museum documenting the history of Christmas Island. The upper floor of the building contains a museum. The museum reopened on 2 July 2018, after it had been unable to accept visitors due to the closure of the access road. The galleries show the history of Christmas Island, as well as its cultural heritage. The house and its precinct are often a location for local community-led events. It is open daily.

== Memorials ==
The precinct is the site of annual remembrance day services. Nearby is the SIEV X Memorial, which commemorates the deaths over four hundred asylum seekers in 2001.
