= Neil Lucas =

Australian politician

His Honour Neil Lucas PSM JP

Administrator of the Australian Indian Ocean Territories
- In office 18 January 2006 – October 2009
- Monarch: Queen Elizabeth II
- Governors-General: Michael Jeffery; Quentin Bryce
- Preceded by: Evan Williams
- Succeeded by: Brian Lacy

Member of the Victorian Legislative Council for Eumemmerring Province
- In office 30 March 1996 – 29 November 2002
- Preceded by: Bob Ives
- Succeeded by: Adem Somyurek

Neil Bedford Lucas PSM, JP (born 10 August 1945) is an Australian politician who served as the Administrator of Christmas Island and Cocos (Keeling) Islands from January 2006 to October 2009, when he was replaced by Brian Lacy.

Lucas was a Liberal Party member of the Victorian Legislative Council, representing the Eumemmerring Province from 1996 to 2002. He was the Parliamentary Secretary to the Leader of the Victorian Legislative Council and consultant to the Victorian Ministers for Local Government and Planning. He attempted to move to the lower house and contested the seat of Gembrook in 2002 state election but was unsuccessful.

Prior to state politics, Lucas was formerly the CEO for the City of Berwick and then the Mayor of Casey. He was appointed a justice of the peace (JP) upon taking the position of Mayor of Casey. In recognition of his significant contributions over the years Mr Lucas was awarded the Public Service Medal (PSM) in 1995 for outstanding public service to local government.

Lucas's appointment was announced by the Minister for Local Government, Territories and Roads, Jim Lloyd, who pointed to his experience in local and state government, public administration and governance, and noted his earlier role as chief executive of the City of Berwick. Lucas and his wife, Margaret, lived on Christmas Island during his term. As the representative of the Queen and the Commonwealth, he was sworn in separately by the Governor-General for each of the two territories, and the post involved a wide range of official and administrative duties.

It also required travel to Canberra and Perth to deal with federal and Western Australian legislation. His duties included ceremonial tasks such as speaking at the island's Anzac Day ceremony. Lucas described Christmas Island as lying about 2,600 km north-west of Perth and 480 km from Jakarta, and said his responsibilities extended to the welfare of its roughly 100 million migrating crabs.

Victorian Legislative Council
Preceded by Bob Ives	Member for Eumemmerring; 1996–2002; Served alongside: Ron Wells, Gordon Rich-Phillips	Succeeded by Adem Somyurek
