= Bill Taylor (naval officer) =

Australian politician

Commodore Bill Taylor AM

Administrator of the Australian Indian Ocean Territories
- In office 4 February 1999 – 30 July 2003
- Monarch: Elizabeth II
- Governors-General: Sir William Deane; Peter Hollingsworth; Michael Jeffery
- Preceded by: Ronald Harvey
- Succeeded by: Evan Williams

Member of the Australian Parliament for Groom
- In office 9 April 1988 – 31 August 1998
- Preceded by: Tom McVeigh
- Succeeded by: Ian Macfarlane

Personal details
- Born: 14 September 1938 (age 88) Toowoomba, Queensland, Australia
- Party: Liberal
- Occupation: Naval officer

Military service
- Allegiance: Australia
- Branch/service: Royal Australian Navy
- Years of service: 1957–1988
- Rank: Commodore

Commodore William Leonard Taylor, AM (born 14 September 1938) is a former Australian naval officer and politician. He was a senior officer in the Royal Australian Navy, resigning to run for federal parliament. He represented the Liberal Party in the House of Representatives from 1988 to 1998, holding the Queensland seat of Groom. He later served as administrator of the Australian Indian Ocean Territories from 1999 to 2003.

== Early life ==
Taylor was born on 14 September 1938 in Toowoomba, Queensland. He attended Toowoomba Grammar School. He holds the degrees of Bachelor of Arts from the Campaspe College of Adult Education and Master of Literature from the University of New England.

== Military career ==
Taylor joined the Royal Australian Navy in 1957. He was promoted to lieutenant commander in 1971, commander in 1974, captain in 1981 and commodore in 1986.

== Politics ==
Taylor joined the Liberal Party in 1972. He was elected to parliament at the 1988 Groom by-election, which followed the retirement of Nationals MP Tom McVeigh. He recorded a primary-vote swing of nearly 20 points for the Liberals. His campaign was helped by the endorsement of former state Nationals leader Joh Bjelke-Petersen. He was the last person elected to serve in the Old Parliament House (1927–1988), before the New Parliament House began sitting in August.

In parliament, Taylor served on the Joint Statutory Committees on Public Works and Public Accounts and chaired the Joint Standing Committee on Treaties from 1996 to 1998. He was re-elected at the 1990, 1993 and 1996 federal elections. At the leadership election which followed the Coalition's loss at the 1990 election, he was a candidate for the Liberal Party's deputy leadership.

In 1994, Taylor emerged as a prominent opponent of John Hewson's leadership of the Liberal Party. He was described by the Canberra Times as a "long-time supporter of leadership aspirant Bronwyn Bishop". He appeared on Four Corners in February stating that the opposition would not win the next election under Hewson's leadership, and in May publicly stated that Hewson should "move on".

Taylor retired from politics at the 1998 election, endorsing Ian Macfarlane as his successor. In 2015, following Macfarlane's attempted defection to the Nationals, he published an opinion piece in The Toowoomba Chronicle, stating he had "regretted my endorsement ever since".

== Later activities ==
From 1999 to 2003 Taylor served as administrator of the Australian Indian Ocean Territories, based on Christmas Island. His tenure was relatively eventful, including the Tampa affair of 2001, a possible typhoid outbreak, and the creation of the Christmas Island Detention Centre.

Parliament of Australia
Preceded by Tom McVeigh	Member for Groom; 1988–1998	Succeeded by Ian Macfarlane
