= Ian Macfarlane (politician) =

Australian politician (born 1955)

The Honourable Ian Macfarlane HonFAusIMM
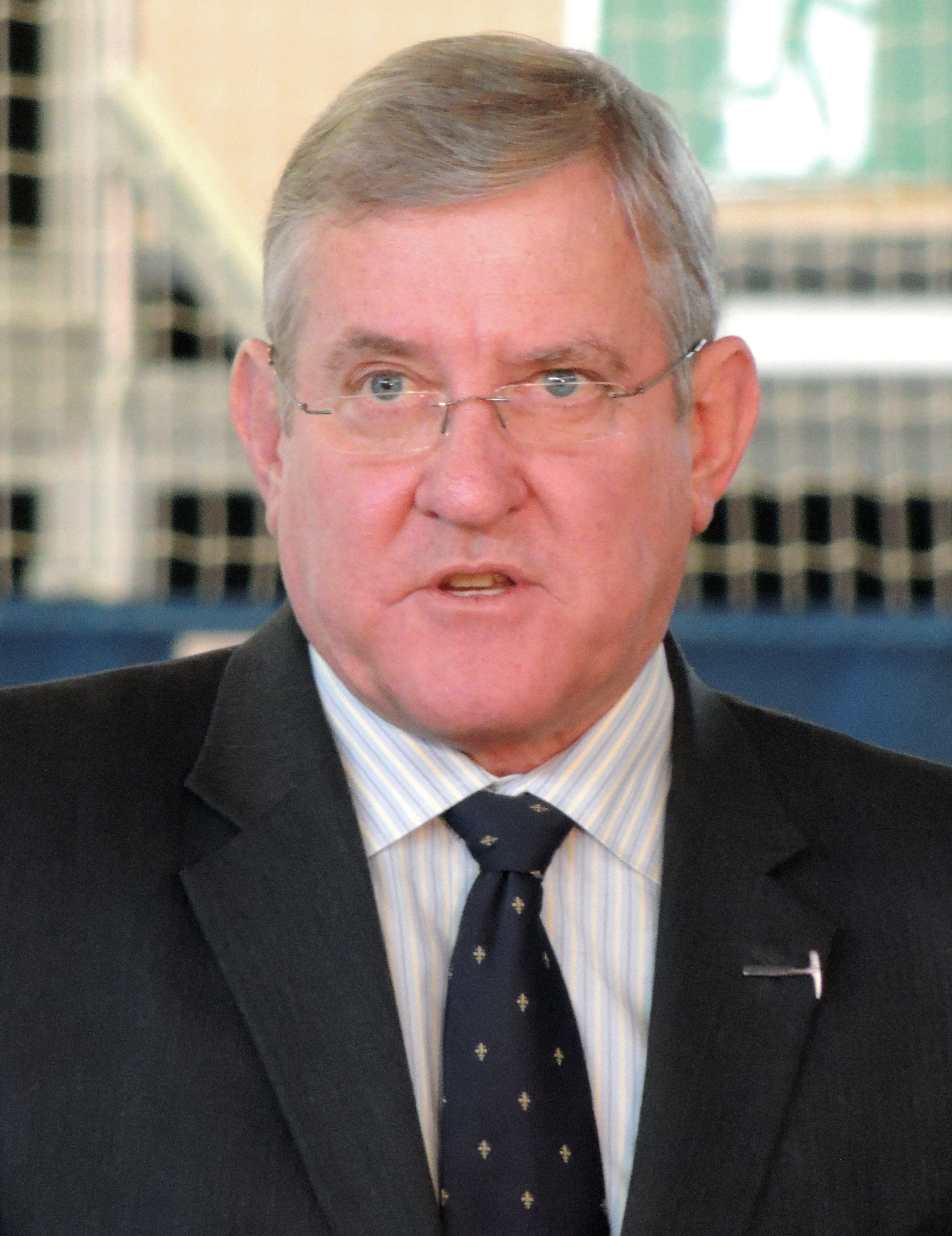
- Macfarlane in 2015

Minister for Industry and Science
- In office 23 December 2014 – 21 September 2015
- Prime Minister: Tony Abbott; Malcolm Turnbull
- Preceded by: Himself (as Minister for Industry)
- Succeeded by: Christopher Pyne (as Minister for Industry, Innovation and Science)

Minister for Industry
- In office 18 September 2013 – 23 December 2014
- Prime Minister: Tony Abbott
- Preceded by: Kim Carr (as Minister for Innovation, Industry, Science and Research)
- Succeeded by: Himself (as Minister for Industry and Science)

Minister for Industry, Tourism and Resources
- In office 26 November 2001 – 3 December 2007
- Prime Minister: John Howard
- Preceded by: Nick Minchin
- Succeeded by: Kim Carr (as Minister for Innovation, Industry, Science and Research); Martin Ferguson (as Minister for Resources and Energy and Minister for Tourism)

Minister for Small Business
- In office 30 January 2001 – 26 November 2001
- Prime Minister: John Howard
- Preceded by: Peter Reith
- Succeeded by: Joe Hockey

Member of the Australian Parliament for Groom
- In office 3 October 1998 – 9 May 2016
- Preceded by: Bill Taylor
- Succeeded by: John McVeigh

Personal details
- Born: 5 April 1955 (age 71) Kingaroy, Queensland, Australia
- Party: Liberal (federal); Liberal National (state, 2010–present)
- Spouse: Karen
- Children: 2
- Occupation: Farmer

Ian Elgin Macfarlane (born 5 April 1955) is an Australian former politician who was a member of the House of Representatives from 1998 to 2016, representing the Liberal Party. He served as a minister in the Howard and Abbott governments.

Macfarlane was born in Kingaroy, Queensland, and was a farmer before entering politics. He was elected to parliament at the 1998 federal election, representing the Division of Groom. Macfarlane was appointed Minister for Small Business in January 2001. After the 2001 election, he was made Minister for Industry, Tourism and Resources, a position he held until the Howard government's defeat at the 2007 election. Macfarlane returned to cabinet in 2013 as Minister for Industry (later Industry and Science) in the Abbott government. He lost his position when Malcolm Turnbull became prime minister in September 2015, and retired from politics at the 2016 election. He is currently chief executive of the Queensland Resources Council.

== Early life ==
Macfarlane was born in Kingaroy, Queensland, and was a farmer and president of the Queensland Graingrowers Association before entering politics. He acquired the nickname "Chainsaw" from ABC rural reporter Judy Kennedy due to his raspy voice. He now attributes the moniker to his ability to "cut through red tape", and it was alluded to in his 1998 election campaign through the slogan "The Right Voice for Groom".

== Politics ==
Macfarlane was elected to the House of Representatives at the 1998 federal election, representing the Division of Groom for the Liberal Party. As a minister in the Coalition government under John Howard he held the portfolio of Minister for Small Business from January 2001, before being promoted to the Cabinet role of Industry, Tourism and Resources in November 2001. After the defeat of the Coalition in the 2007 federal election he served in the shadow portfolios of Trade as well as Infrastructure and Water, and was the Shadow Minister for Energy and Resources.

In an interview with Four Corners on 9 November 2009, Macfarlane said that his position on global warming had changed "a bit", since he had recognised a greater importance for mankind's contribution. Acting as Climate Change Spokesman for the Coalition in 2009, he spent 5 weeks in negotiations around a Carbon Pollution Reduction Scheme with Minister for Climate Change Penny Wong, before a leadership spill deposed party leader Malcolm Turnbull and replaced him with Tony Abbott, and the policy was overturned.

With the election of the Abbott Coalition government in September 2013, he was appointed Minister for Industry. He was later sworn in as the Minister for Industry and Science on 23 December 2014. Upon the ascension of the Turnbull government in September 2015, he was dropped from the new ministry despite being a Turnbull supporter. On 3 December 2015, Macfarlane announced his intention to sit with the federal Nationals. He claimed that his experience representing regional interests was "second only to" retiring federal Nationals leader and fellow Queenslander Warren Truss. Although local party members overwhelmingly supported Macfarlane's decision, the Liberal National Party of Queensland executive blocked the move. LNP officials said that even with the overwhelming support of LNP members in Macfarlane's seat, "the interests of our party beyond his electorate" required that Macfarlane stay in the Liberal party room.

On 15 February 2016, Macfarlane announced he would retire from parliament and not contest the 2016 federal election.

== Later career ==
In September 2016, it was announced that Macfarlane had been appointed chief executive of the Queensland Resources Council. Greens Senators Larissa Waters and Lee Rhiannon claimed that the appointment seemed to breach the current statement of ministerial standards, which requires that ex-ministers not engage in lobbying for an eighteen-month period after ceasing to be a minister. Macfarlane was also chairman of the Innovative Manufacturing Cooperative Research Centre (IMCRC), a position he held from May 2016 to the Centre's closure in 2022.

In November 2016, Macfarlane was appointed to the board of directors of Australian oil and gas company Woodside Energy. Macfarlane's current directorship extends to the 2026 Annual General Meeting, at which he will be eligible for re-election. At Woodside Energy's 2023 AGM, 34.81% of shareholders voted against his reappointment, after institutional investors and the Australasian Centre for Corporate Responsibility co-filed members' statements calling on directors to be held to account for the board's "repeated failure to present a credible climate strategy". Prior to that, no ASX100 energy director had ever received more than 15% of shareholder votes against their reappointment. For the 2023-2024 financial years, Macfarlane received A$657,920 in director's compensation from Woodside Energy.

Despite retaining his position as Chief Executive of the Queensland Resources Council, in which he lobbied on behalf of some of Australia's largest carbon emitters, in late 2021 the Morrison government appointed Macfarlane to the board of the CSIRO, Australia's lead science agency. As head of that Council, he authorised an ad campaign against the Queensland Government's coal royalty policy (calling it a "tax"), even though his former political party was happy with the policy. The campaign, extending over more than a year, cost over A$40 million.

Parliament of Australia
Preceded by Bill Taylor	Member for Groom; 1998–2016	Succeeded by John McVeigh
Political offices
Preceded by Peter Reith as Minister for Employment, Workplace Relations and Small Business	Minister for Small Business; 2001	Succeeded by Joe Hockey as Minister for Small Business and Tourism
Preceded by Nick Minchin	Minister for Industry, Tourism and Resources; 2001–2007	Succeeded by Kim Carr as Minister for Innovation, Industry, Science and Research
Preceded by Nick Minchin	Minister for Industry, Tourism and Resources; 2001–2007	Succeeded by Martin Ferguson as Minister for Resources and Energy; Minister for Tourism
Preceded by Kim Carr as Minister for Innovation, Industry, Science and Research	Minister for Industry; 2013–2015	Succeeded by Christopher Pyne as Minister for Industry, Innovation and Science
Preceded by Himself as Minister for Industry	Minister for Science; 2014–2015	Succeeded by Christopher Pyne as Minister for Industry, Innovation and Science
