= Gordon Thomson (Christmas Island politician) =

Australian politician

Gordon Sinclair Thomson is an Australian politician on the external territory of Christmas Island. His term as President of the Shire of Christmas Island ended in October 2025, a role he has held since 2013. Gordon came 3rd receiving only 87- 1st preference votes in the 2025 council election, and was subsequently replaced by Steven Pereira as Shire President.

He previously served in the same position from 2003 to 2011. He is a member of the Australian Labor Party and has also served as the General Secretary of the Union of Christmas Island Workers. He has been general secretary since at least December 2011, when he served in an acting capacity.

== Political positions ==
=== Views on Australia ===
In a February 2020 interview with Guardian Australia, it was reported that Thomson had lived on Christmas Island for 22 years. He stated that the island was treated like a "colony", that it should be placed on the United Nations list of non-self-governing territories, and that residents should pursue free association with Australia as an alternative to the island's current status. He stated that the local authorities of Christmas Island had not been consulates over moves by the federal government, which included Australians spending quarantine on Christmas Island during the COVID-19 pandemic. The island has also been a host for people processing or appealing deportation from Australia, and called the detention of the asylum seekers there like Guantanamo Bay.

=== Views on immigration ===
He has criticized deporting people who've served prison sentences in Australia but aren't citizens. He also stated that people with the right to reside and work in Australia should be treated the same as formal citizens.

=== Views on tourism ===
He has warned against relying too heavily on tourism, preferring that Christmas Island be used for productive purposes. He highlighted a sustainable farm, and said that jobs needed to be created to incentivize people to stay on the island.
