= John William Stokes =

Australian police officer

John William Stokes (1 February 1910 – 3 August 1995) was an Australian administrator in the Northern Territory Police, and on the Territories of the Cocos (Keeling) Islands and of Christmas Island.

== Biography ==
His maternal grandparents were from Stolp, Pomerania, now within Poland, and after moving to Australia in the 1870s they became farmers at Burnett Creek, Victoria. His paternal grandfather was from North Carolina, USA, and died for the Confederates in the American Civil War. Upon his death, Stokes' father went to sea at the age of 14 due to the destitution at home. He eventually joined the Calcutta Police Force in India and came to Victoria in the 1870s when his first wife's health deteriorated. There were no children. After her death in 1894, his father, then one of the first plainclothes detectives in the Victorian Police Force, married his first wife's nurse in 1895. They had six children, the youngest being ‘Jack’ Stokes.

After the death of his father, Jack left school in 1924 at the age of 14 and joined the Victorian Railways as a “boy labourer”. Later, realising that there was no future in the position, he studied at night to become a clerical officer and during the Great Depression, accepted a transfer to the Victorian Taxation Department. There he languished in boredom until a fortuitous glance at a recruitment advertisement for police in the Northern Territory changed his life.

On 31 December 1936 he joined the Northern Territory Police, caught a ship to Darwin and over the next 20 years rose to be Administrative Inspector and Acting Superintendent.

On arrival in Darwin on 8 January 1937, he learned that training was acquired on the job. He began patrolling the streets the next day. The work included several patrols into outback areas, and in September 1937 he was sent for a year to Elcho Island (Galiwin'ku), off Arnhem Land, to deter Japanese pearlers from prostituting Aboriginal women.

At Elcho and elsewhere as the lone policeman in an extensive remote area, he travelled widely with the Aboriginals observing their country and culture, helping to resolve disputes and administering first aid. Journalist Colin Bednall, who visited Elcho on the monthly supply vessel, described Stokes' camp as a “veritable wonder-home”, with gardens and sheds around the main tent. An airstrip was cleared with Aboriginal labour. His final report on departure was commended for its ‘fairness and honesty’ by the Chief Protector of Aborigines and years later he was remembered affectionately by locals.

Six months after leaving Elcho, it was discovered that Stokes had broken his spine in an accident before going to Elcho and now, after working for two years without knowing it, the spine was collapsing. He was sent to Melbourne where 7 inches were taken off the tibia of his left leg and five vertebrae fused together. He recuperated in bed for four months before returning to work in Darwin.

At the outbreak of World War Two in September 1939, Stokes applied for leave to join the Australian Army but was refused because his police work was considered an essential service. During the war he was in charge of the police district centred on Maranboy, south of Katherine, which was then a tin mining camp. He married Edna on 31 January 1940 and she became a vital unpaid contributor to the smooth operation of each of the police stations to which they were posted. Later, in retirement, he described his time in the Territory as the most fulfilling part of his career. Reflecting on a brief return by Stokes to the Territory in 1977, Darwin journalist Alan Wauchope described him as “the kindest and gentlest policeman of them all.”

Under Commonwealth Cabinet Decision 1573 of 9 September 1958, he was appointed the second Official Representative (now Administrator) of the Australian Government on the remote Indian Ocean Territory of the Cocos (Keeling) Islands. The Island were acquired in 1957 from the United Kingdom prior to the independence of Singapore-Malaysia. He officially assumed the position on 8 November and arrived on the Islands on 15 November after briefings in Canberra and Perth. He served until 27 July 1960 when he left on leave. On 3 August 1960 his appointment was officially terminated by the Minister for Territories, Paul Hasluck, effective from 30 September 1960, and was appointed from the next day the second Official Representative of Christmas Island. Both communities were small, isolated and multicultural and required considerable sensitivity and understanding in their administration. On his departure from Christmas Island in May 1966 he was lauded for these qualities by all sectors, organisations and clubs of the Island. For example, the leader of the Cocos Malay Kampong, Mr Bytol bin Zanley, said in a speech at a farewell function that he would be remembered as “... a good friend and administrator for all he has done for the good of the people and of the community”; and the President of the Chinese Literary Association at a similar function said that, “the credit for the happy state of affairs in the Territory where the communities live in harmony goes to Mr Stokes, who, has served the peoples well by his meritorious services and administration. He has achieved much in the fields of welfare and education...(treating)...all people alike, both young and old, poor and rich. He has been most kind to them.” His period as Official Representative of the Cocos (Keeling) Islands and of Christmas Island is described from a son's point of view in "Whatever will be, I'll see. Volume 1".

In June 1966, he assumed a position with the Department of Territories in Canberra and, on retirement in 1970, was made a Member of the Order of the British Empire (MBE) by Queen Elizabeth for “distinguished public service”. He died on 3 August 1995, aged 85, and his wife on 12 April 2009, aged 95. They are survived by six children, 24 grandchildren and an increasing number of their children.
