= North West Point Immigration Detention Centre =

Australian immigration detention facility

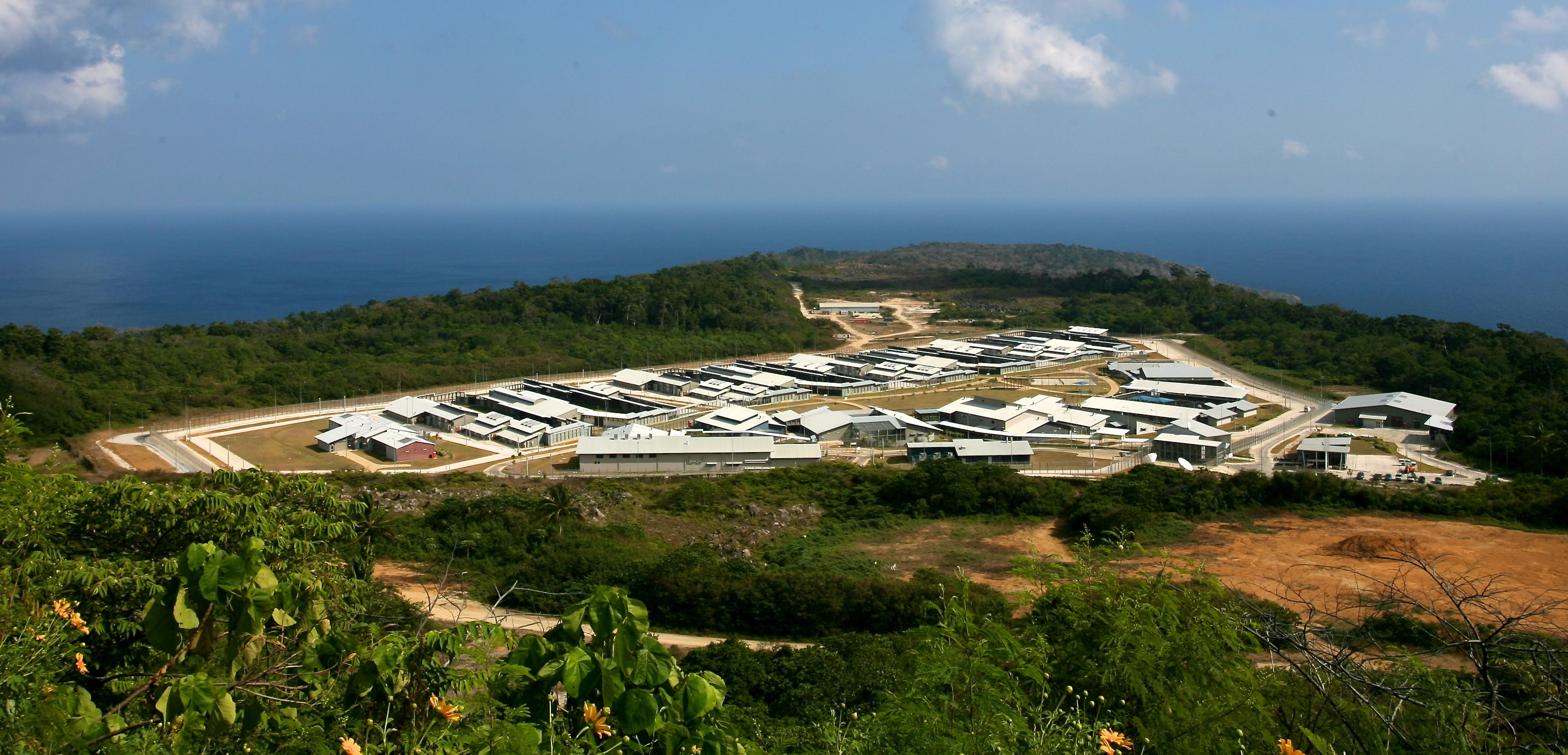
- The centre in 2008
- Interactive map of North West Point Immigration Detention Centre
- Location: Christmas Island; 10°28′17″S 105°34′32″E
- Status: Operational (but no detainees in the facility)
- Security class: Maximum, for Adult males and females
- Capacity: 400 to 800
- Opened: December 2008
- Managed by: Australian Government

North West Point Immigration Detention Centre, formerly Christmas Island Immigration Reception and Processing Centre is an Australian immigration detention facility located on Christmas Island in the Indian Ocean.

As of 31 December 2023, no people are detained at the centre. The last time it was occupied was August 2023 (36 detainees).

== History ==
Temporary facilities for asylum seekers were established on Christmas Island at Phosphate Hill in late 2001. This temporary facility was found inadequate in terms of size, amenity and security. On 12 March 2002, the Australian Government announced the replacement of the existing temporary facility and the construction of a purpose designed and built immigration reception and processing centre (IRPC) on Christmas Island with a capacity of 1,200 people. In June 2002, after a tender process, a contractor was appointed to design and construct the facility on a fast track basis.

Due to the reduction in the number of boat arrivals in 2001 and 2002 (boat arrivals had reached the Australian mainland since mid-2001), the Australian Government announced on 19 February 2003 to scale back the proposed 1,200 person IRPC to 800 places. The existing construction contract was terminated.

In September 2003, it was decided to proceed with the construction of the centre with accommodation capacity for approximately 800 people; 416 housed in purpose-designed and built accommodation units, and a further 384 in basic contingency accommodation.

=== Protests ===
There have been several protests staged over conditions at the Christmas Island Centre.

In 2011, more than 250 detainees hurled rocks at staff and set fire to the accommodation block, causing a substantial amount of damage. They were subdued by tear gas and bean bag rounds, one of the first times bean bag bullets were used in Australia. The protest was against the conditions and length of time people were held there.

In early 2014, about 375 detainees went on a hunger strike, seven stitching their lips together in protest and as a sign of solidarity for Iranian asylum seeker Reza Barati.

Further unrest occurred in 2014 after mothers concerned about the living conditions at Construction Camp for their babies had a meeting with immigration officials. The mothers were reportedly told "you will never be settled in Australia. You will be going to Nauru or Manus Island and that's the end of the story." Following this message, it was reported that the mothers started screaming and threatened to set fire to the camp and were arrested. The Department of Immigration and Border Protection confirmed that following this arrest seven individuals made threats of self-harm and four committed self-harm. Ten mothers were placed on "guided supportive and monitoring engagement" under the PSP, requiring 24-hour surveillance by a Serco officer.

On 9 November 2015, a riot began at the centre after the death of an asylum seeker. The man escaped the centre and was found at the bottom of a cliff. Those involved in the rioting included criminals facing deportation. Damage to the centre was thought to be as high as A$10 million, equivalent to A$11.8 million in 2022. Detainees involved were flown to Perth and placed in a maximum security prison.

=== Legal proceedings: 2014 ===
On 26 August 2014, a class action was filed in the Supreme Court of Victoria by law firm Maurice Blackburn on behalf of a six-year-old girl against the Australian Government, claiming negligence in providing health care for Christmas Island detainees. The girl claims to have developed a dental infection, stammer, separation anxiety and began wetting her bed while detained on Christmas Island for over a year. The claim, if successful, could provide potential redress for over a thousand asylum seekers.

=== Closure: October 2018 ===
On 31 October 2017, there were 314 asylum seekers held in the centre.

On 23 November 2017, it was announced that the centre would close "within seven months".

The facility was closed in October 2018.

=== Re-opening announced: February 2019 ===
In February 2019, the Morrison government announced plans to re-open the centre, after parliament had passed a bill known as the Medevac bill opposed by the Prime Minister and his party, allowing medical professionals to have a greater say in the transfer of sick asylum seekers from Manus and Nauru. Morrison cited the prospect of increased boat arrivals as the reason for re-opening it. The Shire Council president (mayor) of Christmas Island Shire, Gordon Thomson, criticised the move, saying the announcement was "stunning" and "made no practical sense." He told media that Christmas Island has never provided medical treatment to detainees, and this would have to be carried out on the Australian mainland.

In April 2019, the Morrison government paid for 140 Serco employees to be sent to Christmas Island, despite there being no refugees on the island. The same month, it was revealed the planned re-opening was going to cost A$180 million.

In May 2019, it was reported that 20 Sri Lankan asylum seekers were intercepted and brought to Christmas Island where they were held for a few days, and that their claims were denied and they were flown back to Sri Lanka within the month. Gordon Thompson said he had not been informed of this, and criticised the Morrison government accusing it of secrecy. Home Affairs Minister Peter Dutton denied that any asylum seekers had been detained on Christmas Island, but did say more than 10 boats from Sri Lanka had been turned back before reaching the island. Anthony Albanese, at the time leader of the opposition Labor Party, sought a security brief from the Government on the matter.

On 30 August 2019, a Tamil asylum seeker family were taken by chartered jet from detention in Melbourne, with the intention of returning them to Sri Lanka. A last minute court injunction prevented the removal of the family from Australia, and forced the jet to land in Darwin. The next day, a plane took the family to the Christmas Island detention centre.

=== Coronavirus quarantine: February 2020 ===
On 29 January 2020, Prime Minister Scott Morrison announced a plan to evacuate "isolated and vulnerable" Australian citizens from Wuhan and Hubei Province amid the coronavirus pandemic, taking them to the Christmas Island for quarantine for 14 days. On 31 January, medical experts were sent from Australia to prepare the centre as a quarantine facility. On 3 February, about 240 Australian citizens, including 84 children and five infants, were flown out of Wuhan on a Qantas evacuation flight to the Australian mainland and then flown on smaller planes to Christmas Island to spend two weeks at the repurposed facility. Another 35 Australians flown out of Wuhan on an Air New Zealand flight were transferred to Christmas Island from Brisbane.

=== 2022 riot ===
In late March 2022, the New Zealand broadcaster Māori Television obtained footage showing bruised and bleeding New Zealand male detainees being zip-tied to furniture in a dining area within the detention centre. Route 501 founder and justice advocate Filipa Payne claimed that the men had been protesting against treatment and conditions at the facility. She also alleged that members of the Emergency Response Team had beaten the detainees with steel pipes and batons despite them complying with orders to cease resistance. These New Zealand detainees were facing deportation to New Zealand under the character test within section 501 of the Migration Act 1958. Many of these deportees had lived most of their lives in Australia but had not taken up Australian citizenship.

== Facility ==
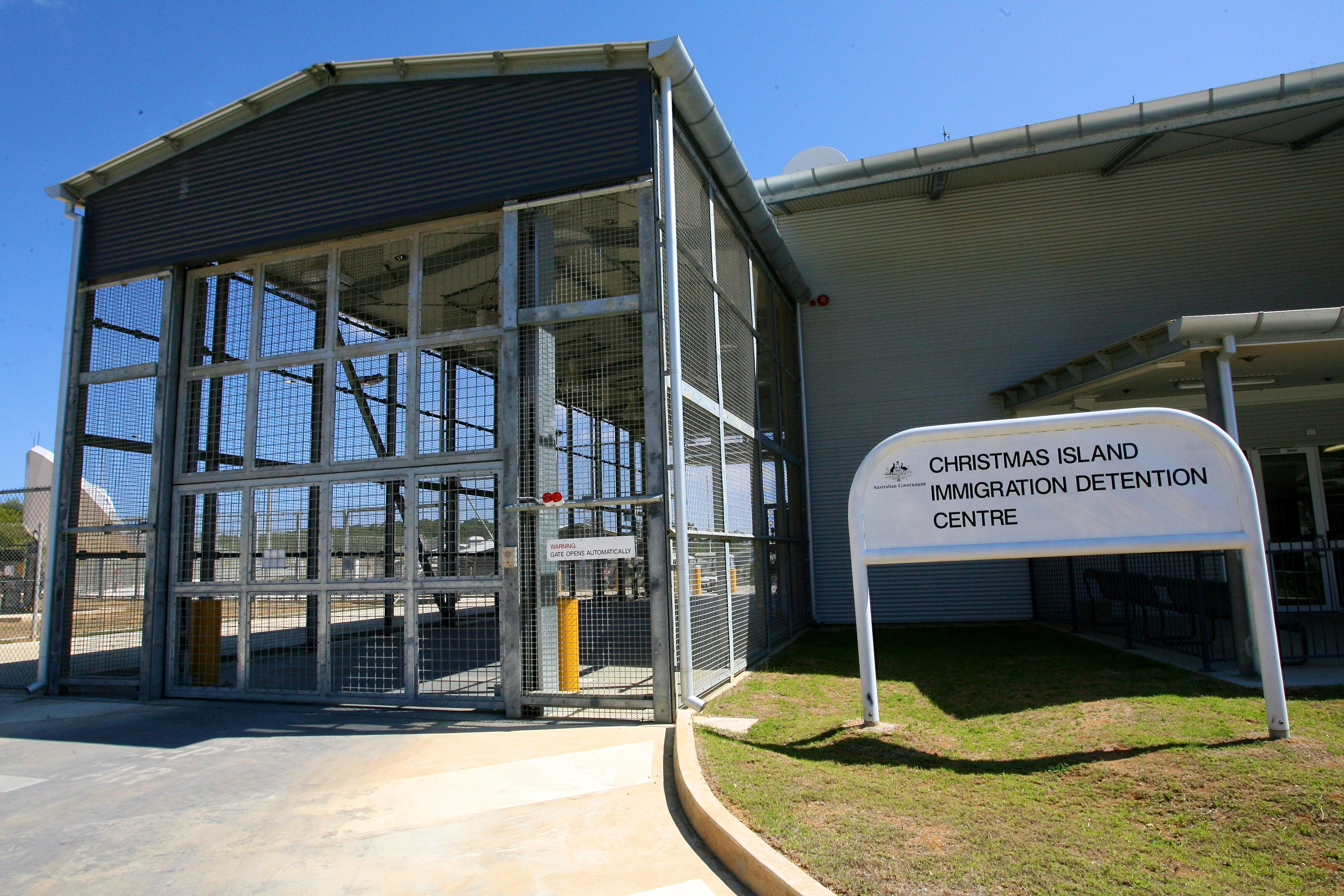
Christmas Island Immigration Detention Centre

The centre was constructed on a 40-hectare (99-acre) site, formerly a phosphate mining lease, at the north-western end of Christmas Island, next to the Christmas Island National Park. The A$208-million centre was built by Baulderstone from January 2005 until August 2007 for the Department of Finance and Administration. It was finally completed in 2008. It consists of eight accommodation units, education and recreation building, tennis courts and central sports area. Central facilities include induction/visiting area, main reception, administration centre, conference centre, kitchen, laundry and stores, medical centre and utilities building. External facilities include warehouse and visitor processing building.

In 2009, the capacity of the centre was increased to 1,800 places and in early 2010 to 2,040 places. In February 2010, the Australian Government announced a further increase of capacity to between 2,200 and 2,300 places "within a couple of weeks". In April 2010, there were 2,208 people in detention.

In June 2013, a surge of asylum-seekers resulted in the detention facilities exceeding their designed capacity. Regular operating capacity is 1,094 people, with a contingency capacity of 2,724. After the interception of four boats in six days carrying 350, the Immigration Department said there were 2,960 "irregular maritime arrivals" being held.

Serco, a private contractor, manages the operations of immigration detention centres on behalf of the Australian Government. Property services are provided by CI Resources, which also operates a phosphate mine on the island.

== See also ==
- Immigrant health in Australia
- List of Australian immigration detention facilities
