= Shire of Christmas Island =

- Local government area
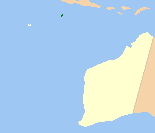
- Location off the coast of Western Australia

- Interactive map of Shire of Christmas Island
- Country: Australia
- State: Australia
- Region: External territory of Australia
- Council seat: Christmas Island

Government
  - Mayor: Gordon Thomson
  - Federal division: Lingiari

Area
  - Total: 136.7 km^{2} (52.8 sq mi)

Population
  - Total: 1,692 (LGA 2021)
- Website: Shire of Christmas Island

The Shire of Christmas Island is a local government area encompassing the Australian external territory of Christmas Island. Under the Christmas Island Act, Western Australian laws apply to the island, including the Local Government Act 1995.

It covers an area of 136.7 km^{2} in the Indian Ocean about 2,360 km north-west of Perth and 500 km south of Java in Indonesia. It has a population of 1,692 (LGA 2021).

== History ==
The island was previously a British territory administered through Singapore but was transferred to Australia in 1958.

The Australian Government provides Commonwealth-level government services through the Christmas Island Administration and the Department of Regional Australia, Regional Development and Local Government. As per the Federal Government's Territories Law Reform Act 1992, which came into force on 1 July 1992, Western Australian laws are applied to Christmas Island "so far as they are capable of applying in the Territory."; non-application or partial application of such laws is at the discretion of the federal government. The Act also gives Western Australian courts judicial power over Christmas Island. Christmas Island remains constitutionally distinct from Western Australia, however; the power of the state to legislate for the territory is power delegated by the federal government. The kind of services typically provided by a state government elsewhere in Australia are provided by departments of the Western Australian Government, and by contractors, with the costs met by the federal government.

An ordinance subsequently created the Shire of Christmas Island out of a merger of the two previous entities. A nine-member Shire Council was established to provide local services. Councillors serve four-year terms, with four or five being chosen every second year. The first elections were held in May 1993.

The Shire's offices are located at George Fam Centre, Murray Road, Christmas Island.

== Demographics ==
The shire has around 1,200 residents consisting mostly of Malaysian Chinese, Malays, people of Anglo Australian descent and smaller communities of Malaysian Indians and Eurasians. The main languages spoken are English, Malay, and Mandarin Chinese. Some residents speak other Chinese dialects. About 60% of the population speaks Chinese at home, 20% speak Malay at home, and 20% speak English or another European language at home.

== Presidents of the Shire of Christmas Island ==
The office was known as the "President of Christmas Island Shire Council" prior to 2004.

#	Portrait	President	Party	Took office	Left office	Term length
1		Lillian Oh		1 July 1992	1995	2–3
–		Jeffery Tan (acting)		1995	1997	1–2
2		Andrew Smolders		1998	1999	0–1
3		Dave McLane		1999	2001	1–2
(2)		Andrew Smolders		2001	2003	1–2
4		Gordon Thomson	Labor	2003	18 October 2011	7–8
5		Foo Kee Heng		18 October 2011	21 October 2013	2 years, 3 days
(4)		Gordon Thomson	Labor	21 October 2013	20 October 2025	11 years, 364 days
(5)		Steven Pereira	[TBC]	20 October 2025	Incumbent	72 days

== Councillors ==
The shire has seven councillors and no wards. Councillors are elected for four year terms, with elections for three or four councillors held every two years. Prior to the 2025 election, the shire had nine councillors.

== Education ==
Christmas Island District High School is the school on Christmas Island. Until the end of 2002 the school was a K-Year 10 school; previously all post-compulsory levels and now compulsory with the new school leaving age (Year 11 and Year 12) studied in Perth, Western Australia. Year 11 enrollment began in 2002, and by 2005 Years 11 and 12 had been established at the school. Christmas Island students have the option to remain on the island or study in Perth.

The shire includes a public library for residents. The library has regular book exchanges with the State Library of Western Australia.

== See also ==
- Farzian Zainal
