= Evan Williams (diplomat) =

Australian diplomat and public servant (born 1950)

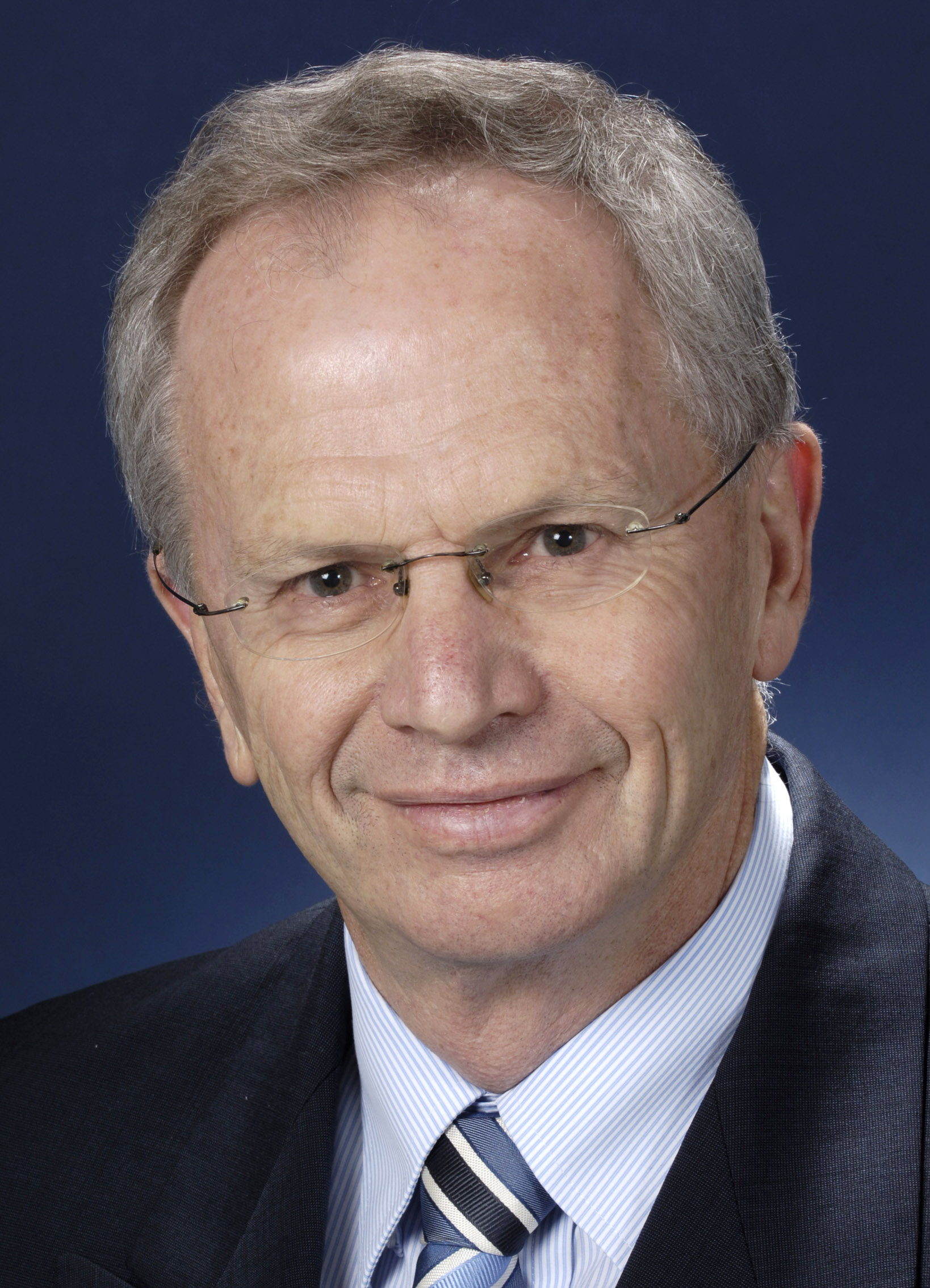

Evan John Williams (born 1950) is an Australian retired diplomat and public servant who served as the Administrator of the Australian Indian Ocean Territories from 1 November 2003 until 31 October 2005.

== Early career ==
Evan Williams grew up in the Blue Mountains of New South Wales and was educated at Katoomba High School, graduating in 1968, the first graduating year of the Wyndham Scheme. Williams holds a BA from Australian National University and a Master of Letters from University of New England, Australia.

Williams joined the Department of Foreign Affairs and Trade upon leaving university and took postings in Shanghai, Dar es Salaam, Bonn and Tehran.

In 1989 Williams was appointed Consul-General and Counsellor in Jakarta, which was followed by appointments in this position in Manila (1994–1996) and London (1998–2002). From 1992 to 1994 he directed in the Trade Negotiation Division and was Director of the Management Strategy and Coordination Unit (1997–1998).

== Later career ==
As Director in the Overseas Property Office from 2002, Williams was appointed in late 2003 as the Administrator of the Australian Indian Ocean Territories, which incorporates Christmas Island and the Cocos (Keeling) Islands. As administrator on Cocos, Williams was responsible for proclaiming the adoption of the official flag of the territory on 6 April 2004. Serving until 2005, Williams returned to DFAT and was Director of Consular Operations until 2007, and was appointed High Commissioner to Cyprus on 30 April 2008.

Government offices
Preceded by Bill Taylor	Administrator of the Australian Indian Ocean Territories; 2003–2005	Succeeded by Neil Lucas
Diplomatic posts
Preceded by Garth Hunt	Australian High Commissioner to Cyprus; 2008–2011	Succeeded by Trevor Peacock
