= Farzian Zainal =

Administrator of the Australian Indian Ocean Territories since 2023

Administrator of the Australian Indian Ocean Territories
- Incumbent
- Assumed office 26 May 2023
- Governors-General: David Hurley; Sam Mostyn
- Preceded by: Natasha Griggs

Councillor for the Shire of Christmas Island
- In office 19 October 2019 – 25 May 2023

Personal details
- Born: Christmas Island
- Education: University of Western Australia
- Profession: Mechanical engineer
- Website: Government website

Farzian Zainal is an Australian politician who since June 2023 has served as the current Administrator of the Australian Indian Ocean Territories and the treasurer of the Indian Ocean Territories Regional Development Organisation. She is the first local-born Administrator. Born in Christmas Island, Zainal previously served as a councillor for the Shire of Christmas Island.

== Background ==
Zainal was born on Christmas Island to a Malay family and speaks the language. During the 1950s, her grandfather migrated from British Malaya to the island, joining a wave of Malayan workers in the phosphate industry. Her father also worked in the mines. Zainal is a member of the fourth generation of her family to live on the island. She completed her education in Perth, Western Australia, like many other Christmas Islanders, since further education is not available on the island. She had previously won a scholarship to study there.

== Career ==
Zainal was a member of the management committee of Indian Ocean Group Training Association, which advocates for on island training and vocational education.

=== Councillor ===
Zainal was a councillor for the Shire of Christmas Island, elected 19 October 2019. During the COVID-19 pandemic, Zainal stated that the elderly population was concerned that younger islanders kept strictly to precautions to keep the island virus free. She was due for re-election in October 2023, but resigned in May of that year to accept the role of Administrator.

=== Administrator ===
In May 2023, she was sworn in as Administrator of the Australian Indian Ocean Territories, which encompasses both Christmas Island and the Cocos (Keeling) Islands, for a term of 3 years commencing in June. As administrator she is chair of the Indian Ocean Territories Regional Development Organisation, which is administered by the Australian government. This includes responsibility for the Indian Ocean Territories Community Fund.

Zainal was re-appointed as Administrator for a second 3 year term beginning 1 June 2026.
