= Brian Lacy =

Australian public servant (born 1943)

Brian James Lacy AO (born 22 May 1943) is an Australian public servant. He was formerly the Administrator of Christmas Island and Cocos (Keeling) Islands.

Lacy was the Senior Deputy President of the Australian Industrial Relations Commission before he took up his position as Administrator on 5 October 2009. He was succeeded by Jon Stanhope after he retired and moved to Avarua, Cook Islands.
