= Ronald Harvey (administrator) =

Australian sports official

Ron Harvey
- Born: Ronald George Harvey; 9 June 1934 (age 92); Subiaco, Western Australia
- Occupations: Public servant; diplomat

Ronald George "Ron" Harvey, CVO AM (born 9 June 1934) is a former senior Australian public servant and sport administrator. He was the third director of the Australian Institute of Sport, serving in the role from 1987 until 1989.

== Early life ==
Harvey was born on 9 June 1934 in the Perth suburb of Subiaco and attended Perth Boys High School. He left school at the age of fourteen.

== Sporting career ==
Harvey moved to Canberra in 1960 and became involved in playing, coaching and administrative roles in basketball. In 1967, he played a major role in the Australian Capital Territory breaking away from New South Wales basketball. In 1979, he was involved with the establishment of the Canberra Cannons basketball team and between 1981 and 1986 acted as the club's chairman and general manager. He was the National Basketball League(NBL) chairman from 1983 to 1987. He left this position in 1987, when appointed the third director of the Australian Institute of Sport. His time at the AIS was challenging on two fronts, due to the merger of the AIS with the Australian Sports Commission with the latter organisation taking responsibility for federal government administration of sport. Shortly after his arrival at the AIS, there was a Senate inquiry into drugs in sport which examined allegations against AIS staff and athletes. After leaving the Australian Sports Commission as executive director in 1989, he became chief executive officer of the Gold Goast Cougars NBL team until 1991. In 1993, he was appointed a member of the Australian Olympic Committee's board and was vice president from 2001 to 2013. In 1997, he was President of Basketball Australia. From 2004 to 2007, he was a director of Football Federation Australia. He organised the 2008 Beijing Olympic Games torch relay leg in Australia. In 2009, he was the first Australian to be awarded the International Olympic Committee's Pierre de Coubertin medal in recognition to his contribution to the promotion of the Olympic spirit. In receiving the award Harvey commented "I have enjoyed every minute of my involvement. It has been a fantastic continuing journey. The athletes make you proud to be an Australian and make all your efforts worthwhile." Also in 2009, he was appointed one of the chief envoys of Australia's FIFA 2018–2022 World Cup bid.

== Public service career ==
Harvey started his Australian Public Service career as a junior clerk in the Department of the Army at Swan Barracks in Perth. His notable public service appointments included Senior Private Secretary to Minister for Capital Territories (1976–1978), Assistant Commissioner within the Public Service Board (1978–81), Commonwealth Director for the Royal Visit by the HM Queen Elizabeth in 1981, Principal Private Secretary to the Prime Minister, Hon. Malcolm Fraser from 1982 to 1983, executive director for the National Tax Summit in 1985, director of the Australian Institute of Sport / Australian Sports Commission from 1987 to 1989, Administrator Christmas Island and Cocos (Keeling) Islands from 1997 to 1998 and Australian consul general in Chicago from 2001 to 2004. Harvey noted that the highlight of his public service career was working as private secretary to Prime Minister Malcolm Fraser, who he described as a "great prime minister and very challenging to work for".

== Recognition ==
- 1981 – Commander of the Royal Victorian Order for director of Ceremonial for 1981 Royal Visit
- 1999 – Member of the Order of Australia (AM) for services to the promotion of basketball
- 2000 – Australian Sports Medal
- 2001 – Centenary Medal
- 2003 – National Service Medal
- 2009 – Pierre de Coubertin Medal
- 2013 – Life Membership Australian Olympic Committee
- 2016 – Australian Basketball Hall of Fame.
- 2024 - ACT Sport Hall of Fame Associate Member
- Australian Defence Medal
- Life Member of Basketball Australia

Diplomatic posts
Vacant Consulate-General closed 1993; reopened 2001 Title last held by K.I. Gates	Australian Consul-General in Chicago; 2001–2004	Succeeded by Bob Charles
