= Electoral results for the Division of Eden-Monaro =

Australian division election results

This is a list of electoral results for the Division of Eden-Monaro in Australian federal elections from the electorate's creation in 1901 until the present.

== Members ==
Member	Party	Term
(Sir) Austin Chapman	Protectionist	1901–1909
(Sir) Austin Chapman	Liberal	1909–1917
(Sir) Austin Chapman	Nationalist	1917–1926
John Perkins	Nationalist	1926–1929
John Cusack	Labor	1929–1931
John Perkins	United Australia	1931–1943
Allan Fraser	Labor	1943–1966
Dugald Munro	Liberal	1966–1969
Allan Fraser	Labor	1969–1972
Bob Whan	Labor	1972–1975
Murray Sainsbury	Liberal	1975–1983
Jim Snow	Labor	1983–1996
Gary Nairn	Liberal	1996–2007
Mike Kelly	Labor	2007–2013
Peter Hendy	Liberal	2013–2016
Mike Kelly	Labor	2016–2020
Kristy McBain	Labor	2020–present

== Election results ==
=== Elections in the 2020s ===
==== 2025 ====
2025 Australian federal election: Eden-Monaro
Party	Candidate	Votes	%	±%
Independent	Andrew Evan Thaler			
Trumpet of Patriots	Wade Ewart Cox			
HEART	Fraser Buchanan			
Liberal	Jo van der Plaat			
Independent	Brian Fisher			
Labor	Kristy McBain			
Greens	Emma Goward			
One Nation	Richard Graham			
Total formal votes				
Informal votes				
Turnout				

==== 2022 ====
2022 Australian federal election: Eden-Monaro
Party	Candidate	Votes	%	±%
Labor	Kristy McBain	43,215	42.57	+3.40
Liberal	Jerry Nockles	33,520	33.02	−3.99
Greens	Vivian Harris	9,376	9.24	+0.46
One Nation	Boyd Shannon	4,351	4.29	+4.29
Liberal Democrats	Maxwell Holmes	2,625	2.59	+2.59
United Australia	Darren Garnon	2,566	2.53	−0.24
Sustainable Australia	James Holgate	2,260	2.23	+2.23
Independent	Andrew Thaler	2,044	2.01	+2.01
Informed Medical Options	Toni McLennan	909	0.90	+0.90
Democrats	Greg Butler	651	0.64	+0.64
Total formal votes		101,517	93.48	+0.28
Informal votes		7,083	6.52	−0.28
Turnout		108,600	93.35	+0.04
Two-party-preferred result
Labor	Kristy McBain	59,083	58.20	+7.35
Liberal	Jerry Nockles	42,434	41.80	−7.35
Labor hold		Swing	+7.35	

Alluvial diagram for preference flows in the seat of Eden-Monaro in the 2022 federal election. indicates at what stage the winning candidate had over 50% of the votes and was declared the winner.

==== 2020 by-election ====
2020 Eden-Monaro by-election
Party	Candidate	Votes	%	±%
Liberal	Fiona Kotvojs	36,388	38.33	+1.33
Labor	Kristy McBain	34,073	35.89	−3.28
National	Trevor Hicks	6,052	6.38	−0.57
Greens	Cathy Griff	5,385	5.67	−3.11
Shooters, Fishers, Farmers	Matthew Stadtmiller	5,066	5.34	+5.34
HEMP	Michael Balderstone	2,154	2.27	+2.27
Independent New Liberals	Karen Porter	1,218	1.28	+1.28
Science	James Jansson	1,071	1.13	+1.13
Sustainable Australia	Joy Angel	944	0.99	+0.99
Liberal Democrats	Dean McCrae	651	0.69	+0.69
Independent	James Holgate	636	0.67	−1.23
Christian Democrats	Narelle Storey	614	0.65	−0.52
Independent Australia One	Riccardo Bosi	513	0.54	+0.54
Federation	Jason Potter	170	0.18	+0.18
Total formal votes		94,935	93.29	+0.09
Informal votes		6,832	6.71	−0.09
Turnout		101,767	89.08	−4.23
Two-party-preferred result
Labor	Kristy McBain	47,835	50.39	−0.46
Liberal	Fiona Kotvojs	47,100	49.61	+0.46
Labor hold		Swing	−0.46	

=== Elections in the 2010s ===
==== 2019 ====
2019 Australian federal election: Eden-Monaro
Party	Candidate	Votes	%	±%
Labor	Mike Kelly	38,878	39.17	−2.71
Liberal	Fiona Kotvojs	36,732	37.01	−4.33
Greens	Pat McGinlay	8,715	8.78	+1.18
National	Sophie Wade	6,899	6.95	+6.95
United Australia	Chandra Singh	2,748	2.77	+2.77
Independent	David Sheldon	2,247	2.26	+2.26
Independent	James Holgate	1,883	1.90	+1.90
Christian Democrats	Thomas Harris	1,157	1.17	−0.70
Total formal votes		99,259	93.20	−0.46
Informal votes		7,246	6.80	+0.46
Turnout		106,505	93.31	−0.24
Two-party-preferred result
Labor	Mike Kelly	50,472	50.85	−2.08
Liberal	Fiona Kotvojs	48,787	49.15	+2.08
Labor hold		Swing	−2.08	

==== 2016 ====
2016 Australian federal election: Eden-Monaro
Party	Candidate	Votes	%	±%
Labor	Mike Kelly	39,565	41.88	+5.93
Liberal	Peter Hendy	39,049	41.34	+0.07
Greens	Tamara Ryan	7,177	7.60	+0.15
Animal Justice	Frankie Seymour	1,986	2.10	+2.10
Christian Democrats	Ursula Bennett	1,763	1.87	+0.85
Independent	Daniel Grosmaire	1,683	1.78	+1.78
Defence Veterans	Don Friend	1,448	1.53	+1.53
Independent	Andrew Thaler	981	1.04	−0.05
Independent	Ray Buckley	817	0.86	+0.86
Total formal votes		94,469	93.66	−0.81
Informal votes		6,399	6.34	+0.81
Turnout		100,868	93.55	−2.58
Two-party-preferred result
Labor	Mike Kelly	50,003	52.93	+5.84
Liberal	Peter Hendy	44,466	47.07	−5.84
Labor gain from Liberal		Swing	+5.84	

==== 2013 ====
2013 Australian federal election: Eden-Monaro
Party	Candidate	Votes	%	±%
Liberal	Peter Hendy	40,431	45.27	+3.43
Labor	Mike Kelly	34,638	38.78	−4.83
Greens	Catherine Moore	6,725	7.53	−2.19
Palmer United	Dean Lynch	4,655	5.21	+5.21
Independent	Andrew Thaler	1,223	1.37	+1.37
Christian Democrats	Warren Catton	861	0.96	+0.21
Stable Population	Martin Tye	601	0.67	+0.67
Citizens Electoral Council	Costas Goumas	179	0.20	+0.20
Total formal votes		89,313	94.46	+0.71
Informal votes		5,240	5.54	−0.71
Turnout		94,553	94.52	+0.13
Two-party-preferred result
Liberal	Peter Hendy	45,199	50.61	+4.85
Labor	Mike Kelly	44,114	49.39	−4.85
Liberal gain from Labor		Swing	+4.85	

==== 2010 ====
2010 Australian federal election: Eden-Monaro
Party	Candidate	Votes	%	±%
Labor	Mike Kelly	37,225	43.61	+0.30
Liberal	David Gazard	35,714	41.84	−2.87
Greens	Catherine Moore	8,296	9.72	+1.91
Liberal Democrats	Olga Quilty	1,152	1.35	+1.11
Independent	Ray Buckley	1,019	1.19	+1.19
Family First	Tom Gradwell	761	0.89	+0.18
Christian Democrats	Ursula Bennett	637	0.75	−0.36
Independent	Frank Fragiacomo	559	0.65	+0.65
Total formal votes		85,363	93.75	−2.52
Informal votes		5,690	6.25	+2.52
Turnout		91,053	94.39	−1.51
Two-party-preferred result
Labor	Mike Kelly	46,300	54.24	+1.95
Liberal	David Gazard	39,063	45.76	−1.95
Labor hold		Swing	+1.95	

=== Elections in the 2000s ===
==== 2007 ====
2007 Australian federal election: Eden-Monaro
Party	Candidate	Votes	%	±%
Labor	Mike Kelly	37,724	44.56	+6.64
Liberal	Gary Nairn	36,863	43.55	−5.85
Greens	Keith Hughes	6,303	7.45	+0.53
Independent	Acacia Rose	1,924	2.27	+2.27
Christian Democrats	Matthew Chivers	911	1.08	−0.30
Family First	Peter Harris	657	0.78	+0.58
Liberty & Democracy	Tim Quilty	272	0.32	+0.32
Total formal votes		84,654	96.31	+1.10
Informal votes		3,239	3.69	−1.10
Turnout		87,893	95.94	+0.67
Two-party-preferred result
Labor	Mike Kelly	45,207	53.40	+6.67
Liberal	Gary Nairn	39,447	46.60	−6.67
Labor gain from Liberal		Swing	+6.67	

==== 2004 ====
2004 Australian federal election: Eden-Monaro
Party	Candidate	Votes	%	±%
Liberal	Gary Nairn	40,783	48.48	+7.40
Labor	Kel Watt	32,592	38.74	+2.00
Greens	Cecily Dignan	6,256	7.44	+2.46
One Nation	Don Tarlinton	1,541	1.83	−1.76
Christian Democrats	Ursula Bennett	1,170	1.39	+0.08
Outdoor Recreation	Tim Quilty	1,063	1.26	+1.26
Democrats	Nazia Ahmed	725	0.86	−2.43
Total formal votes		84,130	95.43	−0.15
Informal votes		4,032	4.57	+0.15
Turnout		88,162	95.28	−0.42
Two-party-preferred result
Liberal	Gary Nairn	43,867	52.14	+0.45
Labor	Kel Watt	40,263	47.86	−0.45
Liberal hold		Swing	+0.45	

==== 2001 ====
2001 Australian federal election: Eden-Monaro
Party	Candidate	Votes	%	±%
Liberal	Gary Nairn	32,247	41.08	−2.16
Labor	Steve Whan	28,842	36.74	−2.32
Independent	Peter Cochran	6,436	8.20	+8.20
Greens	Rosemary Beaumont	3,911	4.98	+1.80
One Nation	Barry Bridges	2,821	3.59	−5.97
Democrats	Linda Chapman	2,584	3.29	−1.32
Christian Democrats	Frank Phillips	1,032	1.31	+1.31
Independent	Steve Urquhart	319	0.41	+0.41
Independent	Matthew Swift	211	0.27	+0.27
Non-Custodial Parents	Peter Vlug	94	0.12	+0.12
Total formal votes		78,497	95.58	−1.21
Informal votes		3,628	4.42	+1.21
Turnout		82,125	96.18	
Two-party-preferred result
Liberal	Gary Nairn	40,579	51.69	+1.07
Labor	Steve Whan	37,918	48.31	−1.07
Liberal hold		Swing	+1.07	

=== Elections in the 1990s ===
==== 1998 ====
1998 Australian federal election: Eden-Monaro
Party	Candidate	Votes	%	±%
Liberal	Gary Nairn	31,654	43.25	−2.70
Labor	Steve Whan	28,692	39.21	+1.30
One Nation	Adam Miller	7,004	9.57	+9.57
Democrats	Dan McMillan	3,343	4.57	+0.98
Greens	Rosemary Beaumont	2,301	3.14	−0.39
Citizens Electoral Council	Gordon Harriott	188	0.26	+0.26
Total formal votes		73,182	96.79	−0.22
Informal votes		2,425	3.21	+0.22
Turnout		75,607	95.79	−0.17
Two-party-preferred result
Liberal	Gary Nairn	36,722	50.18	−4.58
Labor	Steve Whan	36,460	49.82	+4.58
Liberal hold		Swing	−4.58	

==== 1996 ====
1996 Australian federal election: Eden-Monaro
Party	Candidate	Votes	%	±%
Liberal	Gary Nairn	33,151	45.95	+7.97
Labor	Jim Snow	27,347	37.90	−9.30
Independent	Robyn Loydell	4,320	5.99	+5.99
Democrats	Nora Endean	2,592	3.59	+3.59
Greens	Robin Tennant-Wood	2,548	3.53	+3.53
Against Further Immigration	Irene Brown	1,374	1.90	+1.90
Call to Australia	David Howes	615	0.85	+0.85
Natural Law	Peter Fraser	200	0.28	−0.39
Total formal votes		72,147	97.01	−0.53
Informal votes		2,223	2.99	+0.53
Turnout		74,370	95.97	+0.33
Two-party-preferred result
Liberal	Gary Nairn	39,318	54.76	+9.03
Labor	Jim Snow	32,487	45.24	−9.03
Liberal gain from Labor		Swing	+9.03	

==== 1993 ====
1993 Australian federal election: Eden-Monaro
Party	Candidate	Votes	%	±%
Labor	Jim Snow	32,229	47.20	+5.40
Liberal	Rob de Fegely	25,929	37.98	+6.54
National	Tom Barry	5,040	7.38	−2.63
Democrats	Norm Sanders	3,934	5.76	+5.76
Independent	Greg Doyle	694	1.02	+1.02
Natural Law	Peter Fraser	453	0.66	+0.66
Total formal votes		68,279	97.54	−0.23
Informal votes		1,720	2.46	+0.23
Turnout		69,999	95.64	
Two-party-preferred result
Labor	Jim Snow	37,036	54.28	−0.07
Liberal	Rob de Fegely	31,199	45.72	+0.07
Labor hold		Swing	−0.07	

==== 1990 ====
1990 Australian federal election: Eden-Monaro
Party	Candidate	Votes	%	±%
Labor	Jim Snow	29,225	41.8	−6.6
Liberal	Rob Pollock	22,290	31.9	+3.1
Independent	Jim Collins	7,259	10.4	+10.4
National	Gaye White	6,615	9.5	−6.9
Democrats	Denise Redmond	4,208	6.0	+6.0
Rex Connor Labor	Greg Doyle	330	0.5	+0.5
Total formal votes		69,927	97.8	
Informal votes		1,548	2.2	
Turnout		71,475	94.7	
Two-party-preferred result
Labor	Jim Snow	37,945	54.3	−0.1
Liberal	Rob Pollock	31,890	45.7	+0.1
Labor hold		Swing	−0.1	

=== Elections in the 1980s ===
==== 1987 ====
1987 Australian federal election: Eden-Monaro
Party	Candidate	Votes	%	±%
Labor	Jim Snow	30,335	48.4	+1.2
Liberal	David Evans	18,088	28.8	−13.9
National	Peter Cochran	10,316	16.4	+12.6
Independent	John McGlynn	3,582	5.7	+5.7
Unite Australia	Horst Kirchner	405	0.6	+0.6
Total formal votes		62,726	96.8	
Informal votes		2,045	3.2	
Turnout		64,771	92.9	
Two-party-preferred result
Labor	Jim Snow	34,144	54.4	+2.4
Liberal	David Evans	28,577	45.6	−2.4
Labor hold		Swing	+2.4	

==== 1984 ====
1984 Australian federal election: Eden-Monaro
Party	Candidate	Votes	%	±%
Labor	Jim Snow	26,131	47.2	−1.5
Liberal	Murray Sainsbury	23,675	42.7	−2.4
Nuclear Disarmament	Bob Shumack	3,435	6.2	+6.2
National	Alexander Black	2,178	3.9	+3.9
Total formal votes		55,419	95.5	
Informal votes		2,625	4.5	
Turnout		58,044	93.7	
Two-party-preferred result
Labor	Jim Snow	28,808	52.0	+0.6
Liberal	Murray Sainsbury	26,606	48.0	−0.6
Labor hold		Swing	+0.6	

==== 1983 ====
1983 Australian federal election: Eden-Monaro
Party	Candidate	Votes	%	±%
Labor	Jim Snow	36,401	49.1	+4.0
Liberal	Murray Sainsbury	33,141	44.7	−5.1
Independent	Miriam Naughton	2,333	3.1	+3.1
Democrats	Russell Witt	1,977	2.7	−2.4
True Independent	Ronald Sarina	260	0.4	+0.4
Total formal votes		74,112	98.3	
Informal votes		1,302	1.7	
Turnout		75,414	95.7	
Two-party-preferred result
Labor	Jim Snow	38,222	51.6	+4.4
Liberal	Murray Sainsbury	35,890	48.4	−4.4
Labor gain from Liberal		Swing	+4.4	

==== 1980 ====
1980 Australian federal election: Eden-Monaro
Party	Candidate	Votes	%	±%
Liberal	Murray Sainsbury	34,897	49.8	−1.9
Labor	Jim Snow	31,588	45.1	+6.2
Democrats	Norma Helmers	3,586	5.1	−3.5
Total formal votes		70,071	98.7	
Informal votes		906	1.3	
Turnout		70,977	95.2	
Two-party-preferred result
Liberal	Murray Sainsbury	36,987	52.8	−3.1
Labor	Jim Snow	33,084	47.2	+3.1
Liberal hold		Swing	−3.1	

=== Elections in the 1970s ===
==== 1977 ====
1977 Australian federal election: Eden-Monaro
Party	Candidate	Votes	%	±%
Liberal	Murray Sainsbury	33,517	51.7	+16.4
Labor	Brian Maguire	25,243	38.9	−4.6
Democrats	Norma Helmers	5,587	8.6	+8.6
Independent	Michael Le Grand	530	0.8	+0.8
Total formal votes		64,877	98.4	
Informal votes		1,041	1.6	
Turnout		65,918	96.6	
Two-party-preferred result
Liberal	Murray Sainsbury		55.9	+0.4
Labor	Brian Maguire		44.1	−0.4
Liberal hold		Swing	+0.4	

==== 1975 ====
1975 Australian federal election: Eden-Monaro
Party	Candidate	Votes	%	±%
Labor	Bob Whan	26,669	43.5	−5.3
Liberal	Murray Sainsbury	21,661	35.3	+15.4
National Country	John Moore	12,008	19.6	−10.5
Independent	Frederick Dawson	993	1.6	+1.6
Total formal votes		61,331	98.7	
Informal votes		805	1.3	
Turnout		62,136	96.0	
Two-party-preferred result
Liberal	Murray Sainsbury	34,059	55.5	+55.5
Labor	Bob Whan	27,272	44.5	−5.6
Liberal gain from Labor		Swing	+5.6	

==== 1974 ====
1974 Australian federal election: Eden-Monaro
Party	Candidate	Votes	%	±%
Labor	Bob Whan	27,816	48.8	+1.2
Country	Ron Brewer	17,144	30.1	+7.5
Liberal	Jonathan Bell	11,325	19.9	−4.2
Australia	Keith Hughes	711	1.2	−0.9
Total formal votes		56,996	98.6	
Informal votes		835	1.4	
Turnout		57,831	96.5	
Two-party-preferred result
Labor	Bob Whan	28,571	50.1	−0.4
Country	Ron Brewer	28,425	49.9	+0.4
Labor hold		Swing	−0.4	

==== 1972 ====
1972 Australian federal election: Eden-Monaro
Party	Candidate	Votes	%	±%
Labor	Bob Whan	23,836	47.6	−3.6
Liberal	Doug Otton	12,074	24.1	−20.5
Country	Roy Howard	11,313	22.6	+22.6
Democratic Labor	Anthony Abbey	1,721	3.4	+0.5
Australia	Hugh Watson	1,091	2.2	+0.9
Total formal votes		50,035	98.3	
Informal votes		878	1.7	
Turnout		50,913	96.6	
Two-party-preferred result
Labor	Bob Whan	25,269	50.5	−2.7
Country	Roy Howard	24,766	49.5	+49.5
Labor hold		Swing	−2.7	

=== Elections in the 1960s ===
==== 1969 ====
1969 Australian federal election: Eden-Monaro
Party	Candidate	Votes	%	±%
Labor	Allan Fraser	23,482	51.2	+5.4
Liberal	Dugald Munro	20,436	44.6	+1.9
Democratic Labor	John Donohue	1,342	2.9	−0.1
Australia	Patrick Starrs	575	1.3	+1.3
Total formal votes		45,835	98.5	
Informal votes		717	1.5	
Turnout		46,552	95.8	
Two-party-preferred result
Labor	Allan Fraser		53.2	+5.8
Liberal	Dugald Munro		46.8	−5.8
Labor gain from Liberal		Swing	+5.8	

==== 1966 ====
1966 Australian federal election: Eden-Monaro
Party	Candidate	Votes	%	±%
Labor	Allan Fraser	19,875	47.7	−3.3
Liberal	Dugald Munro	17,024	40.8	−3.5
Country	Tony Pratten	3,618	8.7	+8.7
Democratic Labor	John Mills	1,177	2.8	−1.9
Total formal votes		41,694	97.6	
Informal votes		1,005	2.4	
Turnout		42,699	95.1	
Two-party-preferred result
Liberal	Dugald Munro	21,159	50.7	+3.4
Labor	Allan Fraser	20,535	49.3	−3.4
Liberal gain from Labor		Swing	+3.4	

==== 1963 ====
1963 Australian federal election: Eden-Monaro
Party	Candidate	Votes	%	±%
Labor	Allan Fraser	20,807	51.0	−9.0
Liberal	Dugald Munro	18,095	44.3	+4.3
Democratic Labor	John Donohue	1,924	4.7	+4.7
Total formal votes		40,826	98.7	
Informal votes		525	1.3	
Turnout		41,351	96.2	
Two-party-preferred result
Labor	Allan Fraser		52.7	−7.3
Liberal	Dugald Munro		47.3	+7.3
Labor hold		Swing	−7.3	

==== 1961 ====
1961 Australian federal election: Eden-Monaro
Party	Candidate	Votes	%	±%
Labor	Allan Fraser	24,217	60.0	+6.3
Liberal	Douglas Thomson	16,134	40.0	−0.7
Total formal votes		40,351	98.7	
Informal votes		525	1.3	
Turnout		40,876	95.5	
Labor hold		Swing	+4.4	

=== Elections in the 1950s ===
==== 1958 ====
1958 Australian federal election: Eden-Monaro
Party	Candidate	Votes	%	±%
Labor	Allan Fraser	21,410	53.7	+0.8
Liberal	Douglas Thomson	16,221	40.7	−1.1
Democratic Labor	John Donohue	2,250	5.6	+5.6
Total formal votes		39,881	98.4	
Informal votes		649	1.6	
Turnout		40,530	95.5	
Two-party-preferred result
Labor	Allan Fraser		55.6	+0.5
Liberal	Douglas Thomson		44.4	−0.5
Labor hold		Swing	+0.5	

==== 1955 ====
1955 Australian federal election: Eden-Monaro
Party	Candidate	Votes	%	±%
Labor	Allan Fraser	21,007	52.9	+0.9
Liberal	Mark Flanagan	16,609	41.9	−6.2
Independent	Royce Beavis	2,113	5.3	+5.3
Total formal votes		39,729	98.5	
Informal votes		611	1.5	
Turnout		40,340	96.0	
Two-party-preferred result
Labor	Allan Fraser		55.1	+3.1
Liberal	Mark Flanagan		44.9	−3.1
Labor hold		Swing	+3.1	

==== 1954 ====
1954 Australian federal election: Eden-Monaro
Party	Candidate	Votes	%	±%
Labor	Allan Fraser	20,824	52.1	+1.1
Liberal	Royce Beavis	19,149	47.9	−1.1
Total formal votes		39,973	99.2	
Informal votes		309	0.8	
Turnout		40,282	95.9	
Labor hold		Swing	+1.1	

==== 1951 ====
1951 Australian federal election: Eden-Monaro
Party	Candidate	Votes	%	±%
Labor	Allan Fraser	19,574	51.0	+0.1
Liberal	Bill Keys	18,832	49.0	−0.1
Total formal votes		38,406	98.9	
Informal votes		419	1.1	
Turnout		38,825	96.7	
Labor hold		Swing	+0.1	

=== Elections in the 1940s ===
==== 1949 ====
1949 Australian federal election: Eden-Monaro
Party	Candidate	Votes	%	±%
Labor	Allan Fraser	19,004	50.9	−5.4
Liberal	Denzil Macarthur-Onslow	18,317	49.1	+15.0
Total formal votes		37,321	98.6	
Informal votes		517	1.4	
Turnout		37,838	96.6	
Labor hold		Swing	−6.6	

==== 1946 ====
1946 Australian federal election: Eden-Monaro
Party	Candidate	Votes	%	±%
Labor	Allan Fraser	25,231	50.2	+1.3
Liberal	Denzil Macarthur-Onslow	18,560	36.9	+15.9
Country	Pat Osborne	3,292	6.5	+6.5
Country	Allan Backhouse	2,883	5.7	+5.7
Services	Victor Brown	322	0.6	+0.6
Total formal votes		50,288	97.4	
Informal votes		1,321	2.6	
Turnout		51,609	95.0	
Two-party-preferred result
Labor	Allan Fraser		52.7	−2.7
Liberal	Denzil Macarthur-Onslow		47.3	+47.3
Labor hold		Swing	−2.7	

==== 1943 ====
1943 Australian federal election: Eden-Monaro
Party	Candidate	Votes	%	±%
Labor	Allan Fraser	23,662	48.9	+14.4
Liberal Democratic	Denzil Macarthur-Onslow	10,510	21.7	+21.7
United Australia	John Perkins	10,162	21.0	−30.9
Independent	Bill Beale	3,210	6.6	+1.3
Independent	Jonas Crabtree	365	0.8	+0.8
Independent	Cecil Gray	262	0.5	+0.5
Independent	John Egan	211	0.4	+0.4
Total formal votes		48,382	96.6	
Informal votes		1,695	3.4	
Turnout		50,077	97.1	
Two-party-preferred result
Labor	Allan Fraser		55.4	+10.2
Liberal Democratic	Denzil Macarthur-Onslow		46.6	+46.6
Labor gain from United Australia		Swing	+10.8	

==== 1940 ====
1940 Australian federal election: Eden-Monaro
Party	Candidate	Votes	%	±%
Labor	Herb Turner	16,736	34.5	−8.0
United Australia	John Perkins	13,092	27.0	−30.5
United Australia	Frank Louat	6,173	12.7	+12.7
United Australia	Pat Osborne	4,763	9.8	+9.8
Labor (N-C)	Benjamin Kelly	4,575	9.4	+9.4
United Australia	Roy May	1,175	2.4	+2.4
Independent	George Alam	1,018	2.1	+2.1
Independent	Rupert Beale	987	2.0	+2.0
Total formal votes		48,519	95.5	
Informal votes		2,263	4.5	
Turnout		50,782	95.1	
Two-party-preferred result
United Australia	John Perkins	26,575	54.8	−2.7
Labor	Herb Turner	21,944	45.2	+2.7
United Australia hold		Swing	−2.7	

=== Elections in the 1930s ===
==== 1937 ====
1937 Australian federal election: Eden-Monaro
Party	Candidate	Votes	%	±%
United Australia	John Perkins	28,872	57.5	+0.9
Labor	Claude Allen	21,299	42.5	+33.7
Total formal votes		50,171	98.3	
Informal votes		863	1.7	
Turnout		51,034	97.3	
United Australia hold		Swing	−1.3	

==== 1934 ====
1934 Australian federal election: Eden-Monaro
Party	Candidate	Votes	%	±%
United Australia	John Perkins	27,707	56.6	+21.1
Labor (NSW)	Charles Johnston	16,928	34.6	+34.6
Labor	Leo O'Sullivan	4,290	8.8	−17.5
Total formal votes		48,925	98.1	
Informal votes		936	3.4	
Turnout		49,861	96.5	
Two-party-preferred result
United Australia	John Perkins		58.8	−6.2
Labor (NSW)	Charles Johnston		41.2	+41.2
United Australia hold		Swing	−6.2	

==== 1931 ====
1931 Australian federal election: Eden-Monaro
Party	Candidate	Votes	%	±%
United Australia	John Perkins	16,888	41.4	−8.5
Labor	Gerald O'Sullivan	12,619	30.9	−19.2
Country	Arthur Christian	11,334	27.8	+27.8
Total formal votes		40,841	97.6	
Informal votes		998	2.4	
Turnout		41,839	95.4	
Two-party-preferred result
United Australia	John Perkins	25,980	63.6	+13.7
Labor	Gerald O'Sullivan	14,861	36.4	−13.7
United Australia gain from Labor		Swing	+13.7	

=== Elections in the 1920s ===
==== 1929 ====
1929 Australian federal election: Eden-Monaro
Party	Candidate	Votes	%	±%
Labor	John Cusack	19,732	50.1	+7.7
Nationalist	John Perkins	19,692	49.9	−7.7
Total formal votes		39,424	97.0	
Informal votes		1,233	3.0	
Turnout		40,657	93.6	
Labor gain from Nationalist		Swing	+7.7	

==== 1928 ====
1928 Australian federal election: Eden-Monaro
Party	Candidate	Votes	%	±%
Nationalist	John Perkins	21,158	57.6	−7.0
Labor	John Cusack	15,590	42.4	+7.0
Total formal votes		36,748	94.5	
Informal votes		2,131	5.5	
Turnout		38,879	93.5	
Nationalist hold		Swing	−7.0	

1926 Eden-Monaro by-election
Party	Candidate	Votes	%	±%
Nationalist	John Perkins	20,573	60.0	−4.6
Labor	Charles Morgan	13,729	40.0	+4.6
Total formal votes		34,302	97.5	
Informal votes		887	2.5	
Turnout		35,189	86.3	
Nationalist hold		Swing	−4.6	

==== 1925 ====
1925 Australian federal election: Eden-Monaro
Party	Candidate	Votes	%	±%
Nationalist	Austin Chapman	23,371	64.6	+3.5
Labor	Charles Morgan	12,828	35.4	−3.5
Total formal votes		36,199	98.3	
Informal votes		610	1.7	
Turnout		36,809	91.4	
Nationalist hold		Swing	+3.5	

==== 1922 ====
1922 Australian federal election: Eden-Monaro
Party	Candidate	Votes	%	±%
Nationalist	Austin Chapman	14,892	61.1	+9.5
Labor	Ulric Walsh	9,495	38.9	−6.8
Total formal votes		24,387	94.4	
Informal votes		906	3.6	
Turnout		25,293	64.7	
Nationalist hold		Swing	+8.5	

=== Elections in the 1910s ===
==== 1919 ====
1919 Australian federal election: Eden-Monaro
Party	Candidate	Votes	%	±%
Nationalist	Austin Chapman	10,253	51.2	−6.0
Labor	Harry Brown	9,770	48.8	+6.0
Total formal votes		20,023	98.4	
Informal votes		330	1.6	
Turnout		20,353	69.8	
Nationalist hold		Swing	−6.0	

==== 1917 ====
1917 Australian federal election: Eden-Monaro
Party	Candidate	Votes	%	±%
Nationalist	Austin Chapman	12,879	57.2	−2.0
Labor	John Bailey	9,623	42.8	+2.0
Total formal votes		22,502	97.7	
Informal votes		521	2.3	
Turnout		23,023	77.4	
Nationalist hold		Swing	−2.0	

==== 1914 ====
1914 Australian federal election: Eden-Monaro
Party	Candidate	Votes	%	±%
Liberal	Austin Chapman	13,439	59.2	+0.5
Labor	Harry Lestrange	9,261	40.8	−0.5
Total formal votes		22,700	97.6	
Informal votes		589	2.5	
Turnout		23,289	72.7	
Liberal hold		Swing	+0.5	

==== 1913 ====
1913 Australian federal election: Eden-Monaro
Party	Candidate	Votes	%	±%
Liberal	Austin Chapman	13,321	58.7	−41.3
Labor	Harry Lestrange	9,367	41.3	+41.3
Total formal votes		22,688	97.3	
Informal votes		628	2.7	
Turnout		23,317	70.5	
Liberal hold		Swing	−41.3	

==== 1910 ====
1910 Australian federal election: Eden-Monaro
Party	Candidate	Votes	%	±%
Liberal	Austin Chapman	unopposed		
Liberal hold		Swing		

=== Elections in the 1900s ===
==== 1906 ====
1906 Australian federal election: Eden-Monaro
Party	Candidate	Votes	%	±%
Protectionist	Austin Chapman	7,979	67.8	−32.2
Anti-Socialist	John Longmuir	3,789	32.2	+32.2
Total formal votes		11,768	95.4	
Informal votes		571	4.6	
Turnout		12,339	52.6	
Protectionist hold		Swing	−32.2	

==== 1903 ====
1903 Australian federal election: Eden-Monaro
Party	Candidate	Votes	%	±%
Protectionist	Austin Chapman	unopposed		+
Protectionist hold		Swing		

==== 1901 ====
1901 Australian federal election: Eden-Monaro
Party	Candidate	Votes	%	±%
Ind. Protectionist	Austin Chapman	5,451	64.2	+64.2
Ind. Protectionist	William Wood	3,041	35.8	+35.8
Total formal votes		8,492	98.5	
Informal votes		127	1.5	
Turnout		8,619	68.0	
Ind. Protectionist win		(new seat)		
