= Members of the Australian House of Representatives, 2019–2022 =

Members of the Australian House of Representatives, 2019-2022
- ←2016-2019 2022-2025→

Composition (May 2022)

Government (75)
Coalition
Liberal (60) (Note: Including 15 Liberal National Party of Queensland (LNP) MPs who sits in the Liberals party room)
National (15) (Note: Including 5 Liberal National Party of Queensland (LNP) MPs who sits in the Nationals party room)

Opposition (68)
Labor (68)

Crossbench (8)
Greens (1)
UAP (1)
KAP (1)
Centre Alliance (1)
Independent (4) (Note: Independent MPs: Andrew Wilkie (Clark), Helen Haines (Indi), Zali Steggall (Warringah), George Christensen (Dawson))

Composition (May 2019)

Government (77)
Coalition
Liberal (61) (Note: 17 Liberal National Party of Queensland (LNP) MPs sat in the Liberals party room.)
National (16) (Note: 6Liberal National Party of Queensland (LNP) MPs sat in the Nationals party room.)

Opposition (68)
Labor (68)

Crossbench (6)
Greens (1)
Katter's Australian (1)
Centre Alliance (1)
Independent (3) (Note: Independent MPs: Andrew Wilkie (Clark), Helen Haines (Indi), Zali Steggall (Warringah))

This is a list of members of the House of Representatives of the 46th Parliament of Australia (2019–2022). (Note: The changes to the composition of the House, in chronological order, were M Kelly resigned, (Note: Mike Kelly, the Labor MP for Eden-Monaro, resigned on 30 April 2020. Labor candidate Kristy McBain won the resulting by-election on 4 July 2020.) McVeigh resigned, (Note: John McVeigh, the LNP MP for Groom, resigned on 18 September 2020. LNP candidate Garth Hamilton won the resulting by-election on 28 November 2020.) C Kelly resigned from the Liberal Party, (Note: Craig Kelly resigned from the Liberal Party on 23 February 2021 and sat on the crossbench as an independent. On 23 August 2021 he joined the United Australia Party.) Christensen resigned from the Liberal National Party, (Note: George Christensen resigned from the Liberal National Party on 7 April 2022, just days before the election was called.))

== Members ==
Member	Party	Electorate	State	Years in office
Anthony Albanese	Labor	Grayndler	NSW	1996–present
John Alexander	Liberal	Bennelong	NSW	2010–2017; 2017–2022
Katie Allen	Liberal	Higgins	Vic	2019–2022
Anne Aly	Labor	Cowan	WA	2016–present
Karen Andrews	Liberal (Note: Member of the LNP who sits with the Liberal Party.)	McPherson	Qld	2010–2025
Kevin Andrews	Liberal	Menzies	Vic	1991–2022
Bridget Archer	Liberal	Bass	Tas	2019–2025
Adam Bandt	Greens	Melbourne	Vic	2010–2025
Angie Bell	Liberal	Moncrieff	Qld	2019–present
Sharon Bird	Labor	Cunningham	NSW	2004–2022
Chris Bowen	Labor	McMahon	NSW	2004–present
Russell Broadbent	Liberal	Monash	Vic	1990–1993; 1996–1998; 2004–2025
Scott Buchholz	Liberal	Wright	Qld	2010–present
Tony Burke	Labor	Watson	NSW	2004–present
Linda Burney	Labor	Barton	NSW	2016–2025
Josh Burns	Labor	Macnamara	Vic	2019–present
Mark Butler	Labor	Hindmarsh	SA	2007–present
Terri Butler	Labor	Griffith	Qld	2014–2022
Anthony Byrne	Labor	Holt	Vic	1999–2022
Jim Chalmers	Labor	Rankin	Qld	2013–present
Nick Champion	Labor	Spence	SA	2007–2022
Darren Chester	National	Gippsland	Vic	2008–present
Lisa Chesters	Labor	Bendigo	Vic	2013–present
George Christensen	National (Note: Member of the LNP who sits with the National Party.)/Independent	Dawson	Qld	2010–2022
Jason Clare	Labor	Blaxland	NSW	2007–present
Sharon Claydon	Labor	Newcastle	NSW	2013–present
Libby Coker	Labor	Corangamite	Vic	2019–present
David Coleman	Liberal	Banks	NSW	2013–2025
Julie Collins	Labor	Franklin	Tas	2007–present
Pat Conaghan	National	Cowper	NSW	2019–present
Vince Connelly	Liberal	Stirling	WA	2019–present
Pat Conroy	Labor	Shortland	NSW	2013–present
Mark Coulton	National	Parkes	NSW	2007–2025
Milton Dick	Labor	Oxley	Qld	2016–present
Mark Dreyfus	Labor	Isaacs	Vic	2007–present
Damian Drum	National	Nicholls	Vic	2016–2022
Peter Dutton	Liberal	Dickson	Qld	2001–2025
Justine Elliot	Labor	Richmond	NSW	2004–present
Warren Entsch	Liberal	Leichhardt	Qld	1996–2007; 2010–2025
Trevor Evans	Liberal	Brisbane	Qld	2016–present
Jason Falinski	Liberal	Mackellar	NSW	2016–2022
Joel Fitzgibbon	Labor	Hunter	NSW	1996–2022
Paul Fletcher	Liberal	Bradfield	NSW	2009–2025
Nicolle Flint	Liberal	Boothby	SA	2016–2022
Mike Freelander	Labor	Macarthur	NSW	2016–present
Josh Frydenberg	Liberal	Kooyong	Vic	2010–2022
Andrew Gee	National	Calare	NSW	2016–present
Steve Georganas	Labor	Adelaide	SA	2004–2013; 2016–present
Andrew Giles	Labor	Scullin	Vic	2013–present
David Gillespie	National	Lyne	NSW	2013–2025
Ian Goodenough	Liberal	Moore	WA	2013–2025
Patrick Gorman	Labor	Perth	WA	2018–present
Luke Gosling	Labor	Solomon	NT	2016–present
Helen Haines	Independent	Indi	Vic	2019–present
Garth Hamilton	Liberal	Groom	Qld	2020–present
Celia Hammond	Liberal	Curtin	WA	2019–2022
Andrew Hastie	Liberal	Canning	WA	2015–present
Alex Hawke	Liberal	Mitchell	NSW	2007–present
Chris Hayes	Labor	Fowler	NSW	2005–2022
Julian Hill	Labor	Bruce	Vic	2016–present
Kevin Hogan	National	Page	NSW	2013–present
Luke Howarth	Liberal	Petrie	Qld	2013–2025
Greg Hunt	Liberal	Flinders	Vic	2001–2022
Ed Husic	Labor	Chifley	NSW	2010–present
Steve Irons	Liberal	Swan	WA	2007–2022
Stephen Jones	Labor	Whitlam	NSW	2010–2025
Barnaby Joyce	National	New England	NSW	2013–2017; 2017–present
Bob Katter	Katter's Australian	Kennedy	Qld	1993–present
Ged Kearney	Labor	Cooper	Vic	2018–present
Craig Kelly	Liberal	Hughes	NSW	2010–2022
Craig Kelly	Independent	Hughes	NSW	2010–2022
Craig Kelly	United Australia	Hughes	NSW	2010–2022
Mike Kelly	Labor	Eden-Monaro	NSW	2007–2013; 2016–2020
Matt Keogh	Labor	Burt	WA	2016–present
Peter Khalil	Labor	Wills	Vic	2016–present
Catherine King	Labor	Ballarat	Vic	2001–present
Madeleine King	Labor	Brand	WA	2016–present
Andrew Laming	Liberal	Bowman	Qld	2004–2022
Michelle Landry	National	Capricornia	Qld	2013–present
Julian Leeser	Liberal	Berowra	NSW	2016–present
Andrew Leigh	Labor	Fenner	ACT	2010–present
Sussan Ley	Liberal	Farrer	NSW	2001–2026
David Littleproud	National	Maranoa	Qld	2016–present
Gladys Liu	Liberal	Chisholm	Vic	2019–2022
Nola Marino	Liberal	Forrest	WA	2007–2025
Richard Marles	Labor	Corio	Vic	2007–present
Fiona Martin	Liberal	Reid	NSW	2019–2022
Kristy McBain	Labor	Eden-Monaro	NSW	2020–present
Emma McBride	Labor	Dobell	NSW	2016–present
Michael McCormack	National	Riverina	NSW	2010–present
Melissa McIntosh	Liberal	Lindsay	NSW	2019–present
John McVeigh	Liberal	Groom	Qld	2016–2020
Brian Mitchell	Labor	Lyons	Tas	2016–2025
Rob Mitchell	Labor	McEwen	Vic	2010–present
Scott Morrison	Liberal	Cook	NSW	2007–2024
Ben Morton	Liberal	Tangney	WA	2016–2022
Daniel Mulino	Labor	Fraser	Vic	2019–present
Peta Murphy	Labor	Dunkley	Vic	2019–2023
Shayne Neumann	Labor	Blair	Qld	2007–present
Llew O'Brien	National (Note: Member of the LNP who sits with the National Party. Between 10 February and 7 December 2020, he sat in neither the National nor Liberal party rooms, and sat as an LNP member with the government.)	Wide Bay	Qld	2016–present
Ted O'Brien	Liberal	Fairfax	Qld	2016–present
Brendan O'Connor	Labor	Gorton	Vic	2001–2025
Ken O'Dowd	National	Flynn	Qld	2010–2022
Clare O'Neil	Labor	Hotham	Vic	2013–present
Julie Owens	Labor	Parramatta	NSW	2004–2022
Tony Pasin	Liberal	Barker	SA	2013–present
Alicia Payne	Labor	Canberra	ACT	2019–present
Gavin Pearce	Liberal	Braddon	Tas	2019–2025
Graham Perrett	Labor	Moreton	Qld	2007–2025
Fiona Phillips	Labor	Gilmore	NSW	2019–present
Keith Pitt	National	Hinkler	Qld	2013–2025
Tanya Plibersek	Labor	Sydney	NSW	1998–present
Christian Porter	Liberal	Pearce	WA	2013–2022
Melissa Price	Liberal	Durack	WA	2013–present
Rowan Ramsey	Liberal	Grey	SA	2007–2025
Amanda Rishworth	Labor	Kingston	SA	2007–present
Stuart Robert	Liberal	Fadden	Qld	2007–2023
Michelle Rowland	Labor	Greenway	NSW	2010–present
Joanne Ryan	Labor	Lalor	Vic	2013–present
Rebekha Sharkie	Centre Alliance	Mayo	SA	2016–2018; 2018–present
Dave Sharma	Liberal	Wentworth	NSW	2019–2022
Bill Shorten	Labor	Maribyrnong	Vic	2007–2025
Julian Simmonds	Liberal	Ryan	Qld	2019–2022
David Smith	Labor	Bean	ACT	2019–present
Tony Smith	Liberal	Casey	Vic	2001–2022
Warren Snowdon	Labor	Lingiari	NT	1987–1996; 1998–2022
Anne Stanley	Labor	Werriwa	NSW	2016–present
Zali Steggall	Independent	Warringah	NSW	2019–present
James Stevens	Liberal	Sturt	SA	2019–2025
Michael Sukkar	Liberal	Deakin	Vic	2013–2025
Meryl Swanson	Labor	Paterson	NSW	2016–present
Angus Taylor	Liberal	Hume	NSW	2013–present
Dan Tehan	Liberal	Wannon	Vic	2010–present
Susan Templeman	Labor	Macquarie	NSW	2016–present
Matt Thistlethwaite	Labor	Kingsford Smith	NSW	2013–present
Phillip Thompson	Liberal	Herbert	Qld	2019–present
Kate Thwaites	Labor	Jagajaga	Vic	2019–present
Alan Tudge	Liberal	Aston	Vic	2010–2023
Maria Vamvakinou	Labor	Calwell	Vic	2001–2025
Bert van Manen	Liberal	Forde	Qld	2010–2025
Ross Vasta	Liberal	Bonner	Qld	2004–2007; 2010–2025
Andrew Wallace	Liberal	Fisher	Qld	2016–present
Tim Watts	Labor	Gellibrand	Vic	2013–present
Anne Webster	National	Mallee	Vic	2019–present
Anika Wells	Labor	Lilley	Qld	2019–present
Lucy Wicks	Liberal	Robertson	NSW	2013–2022
Andrew Wilkie	Independent	Clark	Tas	2010–present
Josh Wilson	Labor	Fremantle	WA	2016–2018; 2018–present
Rick Wilson	Liberal	O'Connor	WA	2013–present
Tim Wilson	Liberal	Goldstein	Vic	2016–2022; 2025–present
Jason Wood	Liberal	La Trobe	Vic	2004–2010; 2013–present
Ken Wyatt	Liberal	Hasluck	WA	2010–2022
Terry Young	Liberal	Longman	Qld	2019–present
Tony Zappia	Labor	Makin	SA	2007–present
Trent Zimmerman	Liberal	North Sydney	NSW	2015–2022

== Leadership ==
=== Presiding officer ===
Office	Party	Officer	Electorate	State	Term
Speaker of the House	Liberal	Tony Smith	Casey	Vic	10 August 2015-23 November 2021
Speaker of the House	Liberal National	Andrew Wallace	Fisher	Qld	23 November 2021- 11 April 2022

=== Coalition Government leadership ===
Office	Officer	Party	Electorate	State	Term of office
Leader of the House	Christian Porter	Liberal	Pearce	WA	29 May 2019-30 March 2021
Leader of the House	Peter Dutton	Liberal National	Dickson	Qld	30 March 2021-23 May 2022
Chief Whip	Bert van Manen	Liberal National	Forde	Qld	28 May 2019-23 May 2022
Deputy Speaker	Kevin Hogan	National	Page	NSW	26 March 2018-10 February 2020
Deputy Speaker	Llew O'Brien	Liberal National	Wide Bay	Qld	10 February 2020-23 May 2022
Second Deputy Speaker	Rob Mitchell	Labor	McEwen	Vic	12 November 2013-23 May 2022
Whip	Nicolle Flint	Liberal	Boothby	SA	28 May 2019-23 May 2022
Whip	Rowan Ramsey	Liberal	Grey	SA	30 August 2016-23 May 2022
Chair, House Standing Committee on Agriculture and Water Resources	Rick Wilson	Liberal	O'Connor	WA	
Chair, Standing Committee on Appropriations and Administration	Andrew Wallace	Liberal National	Fisher	Qld	
Chair, Standing Committee on Communications and the Arts	Anne Webster	National	Mallee	Vic	
Chair, Standing Committee on Economics	Jason Falinski	Liberal	Mackellar	NSW	from 25 October 2021
Chair, Standing Committee on Economics	Tim Wilson	Liberal	Goldstein	Vic	until 8 October 2021
Chair, Standing Committee on Employment, Education and Training					
Chair, Standing Committee on the Environment and Energy					
Chair, Standing Committee on Health, Aged Care and Sport					
Chair, Standing Committee on Indigenous Affairs					
Chair, Standing Committee on Industry, Innovation, Science and Resources					
Chair, Standing Committee on Infrastructure, Transport and Cities					
Chair, Select Committee on Mental Health and Suicide Prevention					
Chair, Standing Committee on Petitions					
Chair, Standing Committee of Privileges and Members' Interests					
Chair, Standing Committee on Procedure					
Chair, Standing Committee on Publications					
Chair, Select Committee on Regional Australia					
Chair, Selection Committee					
Chair, Standing Committee on Social Policy and Legal Affairs					
Chair, Standing Committee on Tax and Revenue					

=== Labor Opposition leadership ===
Office	Officer	Electorate	State	Term in office
Opposition Leader of the House	Tony Burke	Watson	NSW	18 October 2013-23 May 2022
Deputy Leader of the Opposition	Richard Marles	Corio	Vic	30 May 2019-23 May 2022
Chief Opposition Whip in the House	Chris Hayes	Fowler	NSW	14 May 2013-23 May 2022
Whip	Graham Perrett	Moreton	Qld	30 August 2016-23 May 2022
Whip	Joanne Ryan	Lalor	Vic	16 October 2013-23 May 2022
Deputy Chair, House Standing Committee on Agriculture and Water Resources	Brian Mitchell	Lyons	Tas	
Deputy Chair, Standing Committee on Communications and the Arts	Emma McBride	Dobell	NSW	
Deputy Chair, Standing Committee on Economics	Andrew Leigh	Fenner	ACT	

== Partisan mix of the House by state and territory ==
Partisan mix of the House by state and territory
State/Territory ranked in partisan order	Percentage Liberal-National	Percentage Labor	Percentage Greens	Percentage Independent-Other	Liberal-National/Labor/Greens/Other	Liberal-National seat plurality
Qld	77%	19%	0%	3%	24/6/0/1	+17
WA	69%	31%	0%	0%	11/5/0/0	+6
NSW	44%	52%	0%	4%	21/25/0/2	-6
SA	40%	50%	0%	10%	4/5/0/1	-2
Tas	40%	40%	0%	20%	2/2/0/1	-1
Vic	39%	55%	3%	3%	15/21/1/1	-8
ACT	0%	100%	0%	0%	0/3/0/0	-3
NT	0%	100%	0%	0%	0/2/0/0	-2
House of Representatives	51%	45%	0.7%	3.3%	77/68/1/5	+2
