= 2020 Eden-Monaro by-election =

Australian federal by-election

- 4 July 2020

Division of Eden-Monaro (NSW) in the House of Representatives
- Registered: 114,244
- Turnout: 89.08% (▼4.23%)
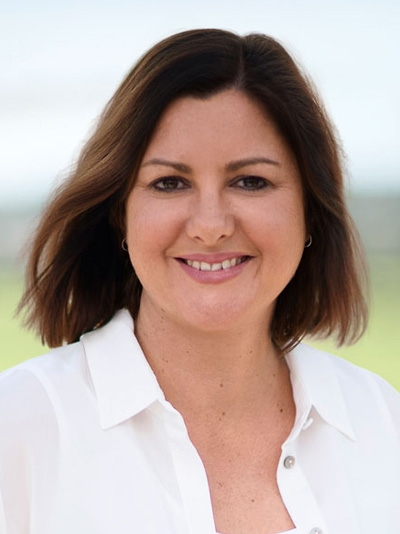

	First party	Second party
Candidate	Kristy McBain	Fiona Kotvojs
Party	Labor	Liberal
Popular vote	34,073	36,388
Percentage	35.83%	38.33%
Swing	▼3.28	▲1.32
TPP	50.39%	49.61%
TPP swing	▼0.46	▲0.46
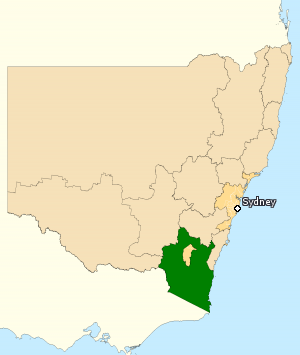
- The Division of Eden-Monaro in New South Wales
MP before election
Mike Kelly
Labor
Elected MP
Kristy McBain
Labor

The 2020 Eden-Monaro by-election was held on 4 July 2020 to elect the next Member of the Australian Parliament for the division of Eden-Monaro in the House of Representatives. The by-election was triggered following the resignation of incumbent Labor MP Mike Kelly. Kelly resigned on 30 April 2020, citing ill health.

The poll occurred amidst the COVID-19 pandemic, and was the first by-election of the 46th Parliament of Australia. On the morning after the by-election, ABC News psephologist Antony Green called the election for the Labor candidate Kristy McBain.

== Background ==
The electorate of Eden-Monaro has long been regarded as a bellwether seat. From the 1972 federal election to the 2013 federal election, the seat was won by a member of the same political party that also formed government following the election. At the 2016 election, the seat was won by Mike Kelly, who defeated incumbent Liberal MP Peter Hendy. Kelly, a veteran of the Australian Army, had previously represented the electorate in the House of Representatives between 2007 and 2013, and retained his seat at the 2019 election despite a 2% swing against him. At the time, Eden-Monaro was Labor's fourth-most marginal seat, held by a margin of only 0.85%.

Two-party-preferred vote in Eden-Monaro, 1996–2019
Election	1996	1998	2001	2004	2007	2010	2013	2016	2019
Labor	45.24%	49.82%	48.31%	47.86%	53.40%	54.24%	49.39%	52.93%	50.85%
Liberal	54.76%	50.18%	51.69%	52.14%	46.60%	45.76%	50.61%	47.07%	49.15%
Government	LNP	LNP	LNP	LNP	ALP	ALP	LNP	LNP	LNP

Prime Minister and Leader of the Liberal Party Scott Morrison confirmed that the party would contest a by-election in Eden-Monaro were it to occur. Deputy Prime Minister and Leader of the National Party Michael McCormack also declared his party would contest the by-election.

After speculation that he would retire from politics, Kelly announced his resignation on 30 April, citing personal health issues relating to his time in the Australian Army.

== Key dates ==
Key dates in relation to the by-election are:

- Thursday, 28 May 2020 – Issue of writ
- Thursday, 4 June 2020 – Close of electoral rolls (8pm)
- Tuesday, 9 June 2020 – Close of nominations (12 noon)
- Wednesday, 10 June 2020 – Declaration of nominations (12 noon)
- Monday, 15 June 2020 – Start of early voting
- Saturday, 4 July 2020 – Polling day (8am to 6pm)
- Friday, 17 July 2020 – Last day for receipt of postal votes
- Monday, 20 July 2020 – Declaration of result
- Saturday, 5 September 2020 – Last day for return of writs

== Preselection ==
=== Labor ===
Kristy McBain, Mayor of Bega Valley Shire, nominated for Labor preselection on 1 May 2020. Anthony Albanese, the federal Labor leader, endorsed McBain as his preferred candidate later that day. On 4 May, McBain was preselected as Labor's candidate, against Yass Valley branch president Michael Pilbrow.

=== Liberal ===
On 5 May, Andrew Constance, New South Wales Minister for Transport and Roads and state MP for Bega confirmed that he would seek Liberal Party preselection, before announcing the following day he would not run for the seat. Jerry Nockles, a former Navy seaman, and Pru Gordon, the general manager for economics and trade at the National Farmers' Federation, were also named as potential candidates.

Preselection for the Liberal Party was held on 22–23 May, and was contested by two candidates:

- Fiona Kotvojs, the Liberal Party candidate for Eden-Monaro at the 2019 federal election, and
- Mark Schweikert, a Queanbeyan–Palerang councillor and director in the Department of Defence.

Following the preselection, Kotvojs was endorsed as the Liberal Party candidate.

=== Nationals ===
John Barilaro, the Deputy Premier of New South Wales and state MP for Monaro, had publicly expressed interest in running for Nationals preselection, though on 4 May he announced that he would not stand for the seat.

Preselection for the National Party was held on 6 June, and was contested by four candidates:

- Fleur Flanery, organiser of the Australian Landscape Conference,
- Michael Green, farmer and chair of the NSW Farmers Association (Cooma branch),
- Mareeta Grundy, former candidate for Queanbeyan–Palerang Regional Council, and
- Trevor Hicks, former Deputy Mayor of Queanbeyan–Palerang Regional Council.

Following the preselection, Hicks was endorsed as the National Party candidate.

== Candidates ==
Candidates (14) in ballot paper order
Party	Candidate	Background
Shooters, Fishers, Farmers	Matthew Stadtmiller	Hilltops councillor. Contested Cootamundra at 2017 state by-election and 2019 state election.
Science	James Jansson	Software developer, epidemiologist and party founder. Contested Kingsford Smith at the 2019 federal election.
HEMP	Michael Balderstone	Party leader and perennial candidate. Cannabis legalisation activist and president of the Nimbin Hemp Embassy.
Independent	James Holgate	Recruitment consultant.
National	Trevor Hicks	Former Queanbeyan–Palerang deputy mayor.
Liberal Democrats	Dean McCrae	Chef and party branch coordinator. Contested Goulburn and Lyne at the 2019 state and federal elections, respectively.
Sustainable Australia	Joy Angel	Office manager. Contested ACT Senate seat at the 2019 federal election.
Labor	Kristy McBain	Mayor of Bega Valley Shire.
Independent	Riccardo Bosi	Businessman, veteran and founder of unregistered Australia One party.
Independent	Karen Porter	Small business owner, member of unregistered New Liberals party.
Greens	Cathy Griff	Bega Valley Shire councillor.
Christian Democrats	Narelle Storey	Carer, founder of not-for-profit platform ReStore Australia. Contested Werriwa at the 2019 federal election.
Australian Federation	Jason Potter	Business consultant.
Liberal	Fiona Kotvojs	Former teacher, scientist and small business operator. Contested Eden-Monaro at the 2019 federal election.

== Opinion polling ==
Eden-Monaro by-election polling
Date	Firm	Commissioned by	Sample	Primary vote						TPP vote
				ALP	LIB	GRN	NAT	SFF	OTH	ALP	LIB	NAT
30 June 2020	uComms	Australia Institute	643	38.1%	37.5%	7.3%	5.0%	4.2%	7.9%	52%	48%	–
16 June 2020	uComms	Australian Forest Products Association	816	–	–	6.3%	6.7%	3.6%	–	52%	48%	–
15 June 2020	uComms	Australia Institute	643	36.5%	29.9%	8.1%	6.1%	6.5%	12.9%	53%	47%	–
c. 12 June 2020	Internal polling	Unconfirmed	600	31%	38%	6%	6%	5%	14%	–	–	–
12 May 2020	uComms	Australia Institute	978	39.8%	34.3%	6.7%	7.3%	–	11.9%	51.1%	48.9%	–
1 May 2020	Internal polling	National Party	1296	35%	21%	8%	30%	–	6%	48%	–	52%
30 April 2020				Mike Kelly announces retirement
18 May 2019 election				39.2%	37.0%	8.8%	7.0%	–	8.1%	50.8%	49.2%	–

Notes
1. 3% One Nation, 11% others/undecided
2. 6.5% One Nation, 5.4% others/undecided

== Results ==
2020 Eden-Monaro by-election
Party	Candidate	Votes	%	±%
Liberal	Fiona Kotvojs	36,388	38.33	+1.33
Labor	Kristy McBain	34,073	35.89	−3.28
National	Trevor Hicks	6,052	6.38	−0.57
Greens	Cathy Griff	5,385	5.67	−3.11
Shooters, Fishers, Farmers	Matthew Stadtmiller	5,066	5.34	+5.34
HEMP	Michael Balderstone	2,154	2.27	+2.27
Independent New Liberals	Karen Porter	1,218	1.28	+1.28
Science	James Jansson	1,071	1.13	+1.13
Sustainable Australia	Joy Angel	944	0.99	+0.99
Liberal Democrats	Dean McCrae	651	0.69	+0.69
Independent	James Holgate	636	0.67	−1.23
Christian Democrats	Narelle Storey	614	0.65	−0.52
Independent Australia One	Riccardo Bosi	513	0.54	+0.54
Federation	Jason Potter	170	0.18	+0.18
Total formal votes		94,935	93.29	+0.09
Informal votes		6,832	6.71	−0.09
Turnout		101,767	89.08	−4.23
Two-party-preferred result
Labor	Kristy McBain	47,835	50.39	−0.46
Liberal	Fiona Kotvojs	47,100	49.61	+0.46
Labor hold		Swing	−0.46	

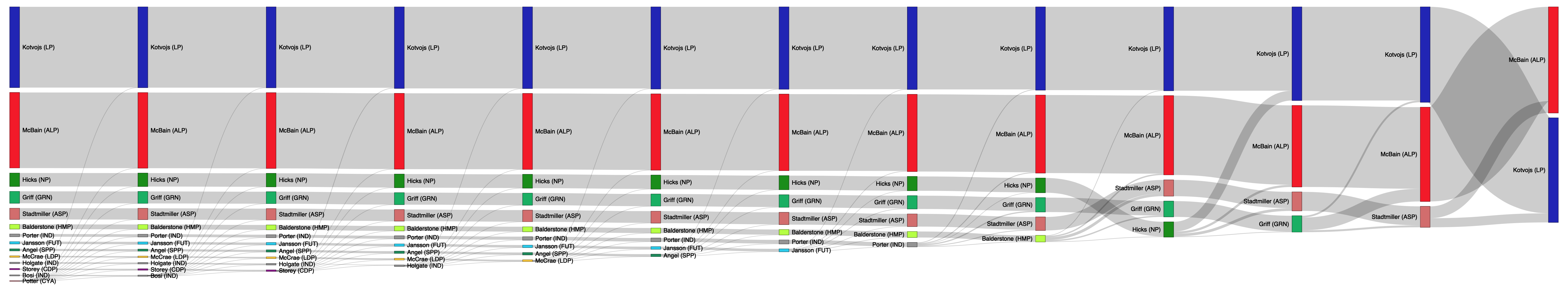
Diagram of preference flows at the Eden-Monaro by-election

== See also ==
- List of Australian federal by-elections
