= 2020 Groom by-election =

Australian federal by-election

- 28 November 2020

Division of Groom (QLD) in the House of Representatives
- Registered: 108,550
- Turnout: 81.66%
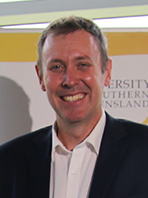

| Candidate | Garth Hamilton | Chris Meibusch |
| Party | Liberal National | Labor |
| Popular vote | 51,534 | 23,500 |
| Percentage | 59.83% | 27.28% |
| Swing | ▲6.49pp | ▲8.62pp |
| TPP | 67.19% | 32.81% |
| TPP swing | ▼3.29pp | ▲3.29pp |
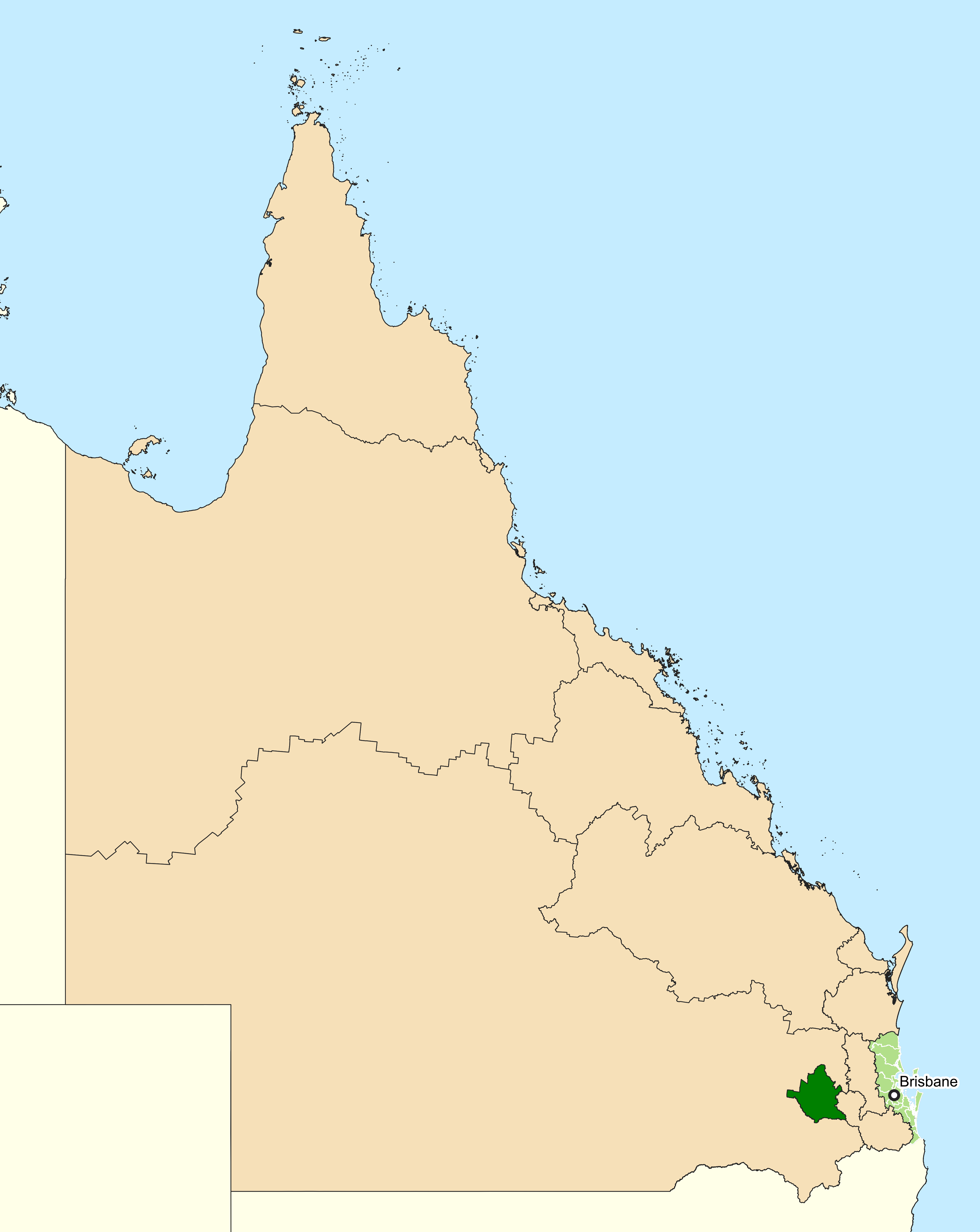
- The Division of Groom in Queensland
MP before election
John McVeigh
Liberal National
Elected MP
Garth Hamilton
Liberal National

The 2020 Groom by-election was held on 28 November 2020 to elect the next Member of Parliament for the division of Groom in the House of Representatives. The by-election was triggered following the resignation of incumbent Liberal National MP John McVeigh on 18 September 2020.

== Background ==
The electorate of Groom, like the Division of Darling Downs before it, is a safe conservative seat. Since its foundation in 1984, it has always been held by the Country/National, Liberal or, since 2010, Liberal National parties. Groom has been represented by four MPs: the first, Tom McVeigh, was a Nationals MP and father of the outgoing MP John McVeigh. McVeigh's appointment as Queensland Agent-General in London led to his resignation, with both the National and Liberal parties contesting the ensuing by-election. With a 20.1% drop in the Nationals primary vote following the failed Joh for Canberra campaign, the Liberal candidate Bill Taylor, a former naval officer, was elected and served until his retirement at the 1998 federal election.

Taylor was succeeded by Ian Macfarlane, who served as a minister in the Howard and Abbott governments. Macfarlane remained aligned to the federal Liberal Party following the merger of the Queensland Liberals and Nationals in 2008, but in 2015 attempted to defect to the federal Nationals after being dropped from cabinet. The move was blocked by party executives, and Macfarlane opted to retire at the 2016 election.

The outgoing MP, John McVeigh, was elected to federal parliament in 2016, having previously served in the Legislative Assembly of Queensland as the member for Toowoomba South. McVeigh's pre-selection triggered the 2016 Toowoomba South state by-election, with the seat being retained by the Liberal Nationals. Despite serving as the Toowoomba branch president of the Young Nationals in the 1980s, McVeigh sat with the federal Liberals upon his election.

Two-party-preferred vote in Groom, 2010–2019
| Election | 2010 | 2013 | 2016 | 2019 |
|---|---|---|---|---|
| Liberal National | 68.53% | 66.47% | 65.31% | 70.48% |
| Labor | 31.47% | 33.53% | 34.69% | 29.52% |

== Key dates ==
Key dates in relation to the by-election are:

- Monday, 26 October 2020 – Issue of writ
- Monday, 2 November 2020 – Close of electoral rolls (8pm)
- Thursday, 5 November 2020 – Close of nominations (12 noon)
- Friday, 6 November 2020 – Declaration of nominations (12 noon)
- Wednesday, 11 November 2020 – Start of early voting
- Saturday, 28 November 2020 – Polling day (8am to 6pm)
- Wednesday, 2 December 2020 – Declaration of result
- Friday, 11 December 2020 – Last day for receipt of postal votes
- Wednesday, 3 February 2021 – Last day for return of writs

== Preselection ==
=== Liberal National ===
Matt Canavan, an LNP Senator for Queensland who sits with the federal National Party room, had publicly expressed interest in seeking Liberal National preselection. On 28 September, Canavan confirmed he would not stand after the Groom branch of the Liberal Nationals voted to defer a decision on whether the seat would remain aligned with the federal Liberal Party.

Preselection for the Liberal National Party was to be held on 25 October, and was expected to be contested by eight candidates:

- Bryce Camm, Beef Australia and Australian Lot Feeders' Association president
- Daniel Cassidy, racing car driver
- Shane Charles, businessman
- Sara Hales, former general manager of Toowoomba Wellcamp Airport
- Garth Hamilton, businessman and mining engineer
- Andrew Meara, stock agent
- David van Gend, doctor and former spokesperson for Coalition for Marriage
- Rebecca Vonhoff, Toowoomba councillor

Prior to the preselection, van Gend's candidacy was endorsed by several prominent conservatives, including Canavan, Tasmanian senator Eric Abetz, former Nationals leader and Deputy Prime Minister John Anderson and columnist Miranda Devine. Vonhoff was believed to have to the backing of Prime Minister Scott Morrison and former Groom MP Ian Macfarlane.

On 25 October 2020, Garth Hamilton won the preselection and was the LNP candidate for the by-election.

=== Labor ===
Lawyer Chris Meibusch was preselected by Labor to contest the by-election. Meibusch previously contested the seat in the 2007 and 2010 federal elections but was unsuccessful.

=== Greens ===
The Australian Greens decided to not contest the by-election. It was the first federal by-election the party had not contested since Warringah in 1994.

== Candidates ==
Four candidates nominated to contest the by-election.

Candidates (4) in ballot paper order
| Party | Candidate | Background |
|---|---|---|
| Sustainable Australia | Sandra Jephcott | Veterinarian and farmer. |
| Liberal Democrats | Craig Farquharson | Toowoomba vape store owner. |
| Liberal National | Garth Hamilton | Businessman and mining engineer. |
| Labor | Chris Meibusch | Lawyer and local environmental activist. |

== Results ==
2020 Groom by-election
| Party | Candidate | Votes | % | ±% |
|---|---|---|---|---|
| Liberal National | Garth Hamilton | 51,534 | 59.83 | +6.49 |
| Labor | Chris Meibusch | 23,500 | 27.28 | +8.62 |
| Sustainable Australia | Sandra Jephcott | 6,716 | 7.80 | +7.80 |
| Liberal Democrats | Craig Farquharson | 4,391 | 5.10 | +5.10 |
| Total formal votes | | 86,141 | 97.18 | +0.38 |
| Informal votes | | 2,504 | 2.82 | −0.38 |
| Turnout | | 88,645 | 81.66 | −11.38 |
Two-party-preferred result
| Liberal National | Garth Hamilton | 57,875 | 67.19 | −3.29 |
| Labor | Chris Meibusch | 28,266 | 32.81 | +3.29 |
| Liberal National hold | | Swing | −3.29 | |

== See also ==
- List of Australian federal by-elections
