= Bob Whan =

Australian politician

Bob Whan AM
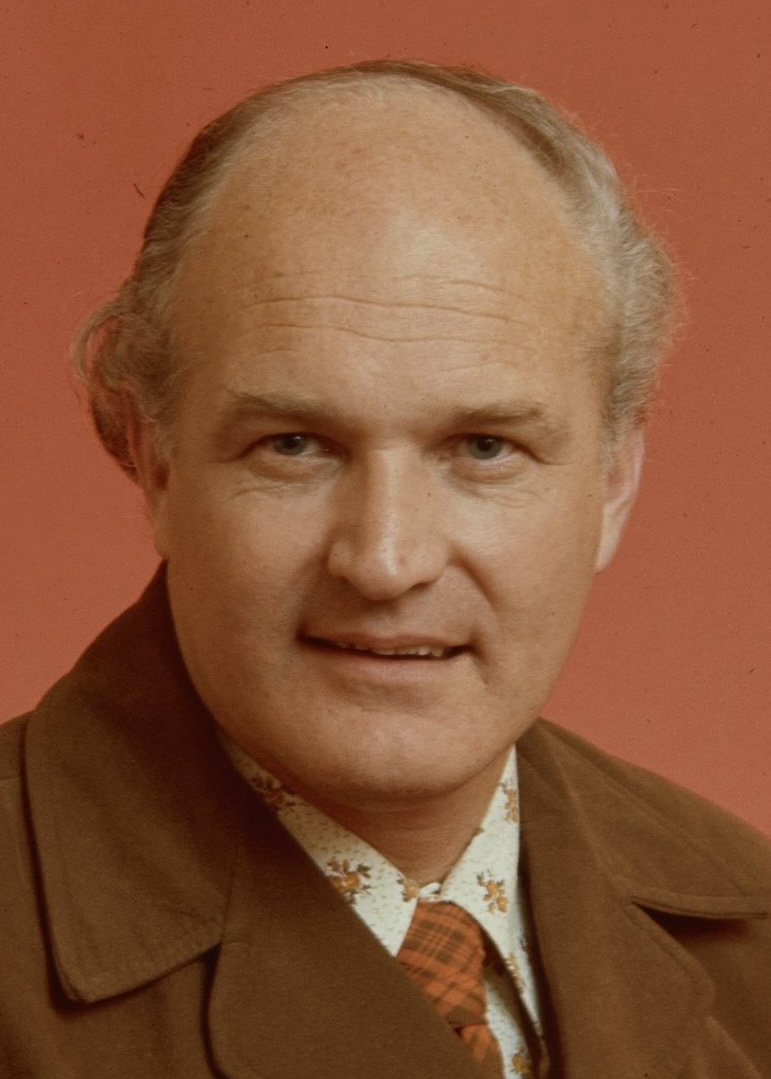
- Whan in 1974

Member of the Australian Parliament for Eden-Monaro
- In office 2 December 1972 – 13 December 1975
- Preceded by: Allan Fraser
- Succeeded by: Murray Sainsbury

Personal details
- Born: Robert Bruce Whan; 5 January 1933 Wodonga, Victoria, Australia
- Died: 4 October 2015 (aged 82)
- Party: Labor
- Children: Steve Whan
- Education: University of New South Wales; University of Leeds
- Occupation: Agricultural scientist

Robert Bruce Whan AM (5 January 1933 – 4 October 2015) was an Australian politician. He was a member of the Australian Labor Party (ALP) and represented the Division of Eden-Monaro in the House of Representatives from 1972 to 1975. He worked in the wool industry before entering politics.

== Early life ==
Whan was born in Wodonga, Victoria. His parents moved to Melbourne where he attended East Kew Central School and Richmond Technical College. He left school at the age of 15 and went with his family to King Island, where he worked in the dairy industry. Whan later moved to Albury, New South Wales, where he worked in a woolstore and gained a wool classing certificate. He later attained a degree in wool technology from the University of New South Wales and completed postgraduate studies at the University of Leeds in England. He worked as a public servant before entering politics, serving as the officer-in-charge of the wool marketing section of the Bureau of Agricultural Economics.

== Politics ==
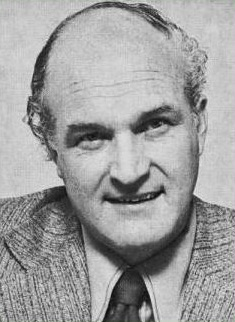
Whan in 1973

Whan was elected to federal parliament at the 1972 federal election, as the Labor candidate in the Division of Eden-Monaro. He won the seat by a margin of 503 votes, and retained it at the 1974 election by a margin of 146 votes, making it one of the most marginal seats in the country. He lost his seat in Labor's landslide defeat at the 1975 election, although the relatively small swing against him was seen as evidence of his personal following.

Whan won Labor preselection as the Labor candidate in the Division of Canberra at the 1977 election, but following a series of challenges the initial ballot was overturned and he was replaced by Henry Lawrence, who lost to the incumbent Liberal MP John Haslem. He later served as chief of staff to Richard Amery.

== Later life ==
After his defeat Whan served as head of the New South Wales Milk Board and executive director of the Australian Council for Overseas Aid. He was also a founder of Jobless Action, a Canberra-based organisation.

== Personal life ==
Whan died of cardiac arrest on 4 October 2015 at the age of 82. His son, Steve Whan has been the member for Monaro in the New South Wales Legislative Assembly since 2023, having previously been the member from 2003 to 2011 and a served in the Legislative Council from 2011 to 2015.

Prior to entering the New South Wales Parliament, Steve was the unsuccessful candidate for his father's old federal seat of Eden-Monaro in the 1998 and 2001 elections.

== Notes ==
Parliament of Australia
Preceded by Allan Fraser	Member for Eden-Monaro; 1972–1975	Succeeded by Murray Sainsbury
