= Garth Hamilton =

Australian politician

Garth Hamilton MP
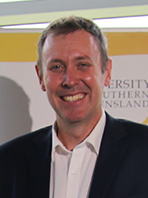
- Hamilton in 2022

Member of the Australian Parliament for Groom
- Incumbent
- Assumed office 28 November 2020
- Preceded by: John McVeigh

Personal details
- Born: 5 March 1979 (age 47) Southport, Queensland, Australia
- Party: Liberal National
- Spouse: Louise
- Children: 3
- Education: University of Queensland
- Occupation: Engineer

Garth Russell Hamilton (born 5 March 1979) is an Australian politician who is a member of the House of Representatives representing the Division of Groom. He was elected in the 2020 Groom by-election, following the retirement of John McVeigh. He is a member of the Liberal National Party of Queensland (LNP) and sits with the Liberal Party in federal parliament.

== Early life and career ==
Hamilton grew up in Ipswich and his father was a concreter. His mother had worked as a Hansard reporter in the Australian Parliament.

Hamilton attended Ipswich Grammar School before studying engineering at the University of Queensland. He is an engineer who has worked around the world on various large infrastructure projects. Prior to his election, Hamilton led research in the mining industry for the Cooperative Research Centre for Optimising Resource Extraction (CRC ORE).

== Political career ==
Within the LNP, he previously served as a campaign manager for the state MP for Toowoomba North, Trevor Watts. Hamilton wrote articles for The Spectator Australia, including an opinion column titled "Absent Fathers Matter", arguing that social problems among Aboriginal Australians and African Americans such as incarceration rates would be alleviated if fathers were more present in the lives of the children.

=== Preselection ===
John McVeigh, the member for Groom, resigned from parliament in September 2020, triggering a preselection contest between seven candidates to contest the safe LNP seat. The Prime Minister, Scott Morrison was reported to have wanted a woman to be preselected, and the Queensland Resources Council had backed two women who were both reported to be frontrunners. Hamilton won the preselection for the seat in October 2020. Hamilton was labelled a "consensus candidate" by party members who attended the preselection, and was reported to have given the strongest speech and answers to questions.

During the by-election in November 2020, Hamilton defeated three other candidates and was elected with a 3% swing against the LNP. He was sworn into the House of Representatives on 3 December 2020.

=== Parliament ===
Hamilton was an early critic of the Queensland Government's handling of the Wellcamp Quarantine Facility.

Prior to its approval by the Queensland State Government, Hamilton was a vocal supporter of the New Acland Mine Stage 3 expansion.

Hamilton has pushed for delivery of the Inland Rail project, pointing to the economic benefits it will bring to the Toowoomba Region.

Hamilton has been supportive of the proposed new dam at Emu Creek.

Hamilton was appointed Deputy Chair of the House Standing Committee on Economics on 26 July 2022.

Hamilton votes against firearms control.

Hamilton is reported to be a member of the National Right faction of the Liberal Party.

== Personal life ==
As of 2020, Hamilton lives in Toowoomba with his wife Louise and three children. Hamilton is a volunteer firefighter.
