= Division of Groom =

Australian federal electoral division

Coordinates: 27.484°S 151.653°E

Groom Australian House of Representatives Division
- Interactive map of boundaries since the 2019 federal election
- Created: 1984
- MP: Garth Hamilton
- Party: Liberal (Note: Member of the Liberal National Party of Queensland sitting with the federal parliamentary Liberal Party.)
- Namesake: Sir Littleton Groom
- Electors: 119,054 (2025)
- Area: 5,586 km^{2} (2,156.8 sq mi)
- Demographic: Provincial
Electorates around Groom:
Maranoa	Maranoa	Maranoa
Maranoa	Groom	Wright
Maranoa	Maranoa	Maranoa

The Division of Groom is an Australian electoral division in the state of Queensland.

Groom is an agricultural electorate located on the Darling Downs in southern Queensland. It includes the regional city of Toowoomba and rural communities to the west and south.

Its current MP has been Garth Hamilton of the Liberal Party since 2020.

== Geography ==
Since 1984, federal electoral division boundaries in Australia have been determined at redistributions by a redistribution committee appointed by the Australian Electoral Commission. Redistributions occur for the boundaries of divisions in a particular state, and they occur every seven years, or sooner if a state's representation entitlement changes or when divisions of a state are malapportioned.

The Division of Groom is located in the rural areas west of Brisbane and is centred on the city of Toowoomba, Australia's second largest inland city. Other centres include Oakey and Pittsworth.

== History ==
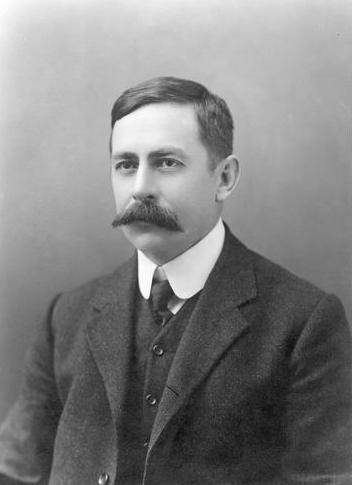
Sir Littleton Groom, the division's namesake

The division was created in 1984 as essentially a reconfigured version of the old Division of Darling Downs, which had existed since Federation. It is named in honour of Sir Littleton Groom, who represented Darling Downs with only one short break from 1901 to 1936 and served as Speaker of the Australian House of Representatives.

The seat has never elected a Labor member in either of its incarnations as Darling Downs or Groom. Toowoomba itself (particularly, the northern suburbs) has pockets of Labor support and was represented by Labor at state level as late as 2012. However, it is nowhere near enough to overcome the conservative bent of the rural areas.

Groom's electors have historically been socially conservative. In 2017, it was one of only three electorates in Queensland to vote against the Marriage Survey. However, sentiment had begun to shift in the 2022 federal election. The election showed a strong increase in votes for independent candidates, with the two-candidate preferred result indicating local independent candidate, Suzie Holt, securing 43.11% of the vote, following distribution of preferences. This was despite Holt having a low primary vote of 8.26% and coming fourth in first preference votes. Psephologist Antony Green described this electoral achievement by Holt as "startling".

It was the second time that the Coalition's hold on Groom had been remotely threatened in its present incarnation; in 2007, the Liberals were held to 58.2 percent of the two-party vote despite winning enough primary votes to retain the seat outright. Before 2025, the 2007 election was the only time that the Coalition won less than 62 percent of the two-party vote in the seat's present incarnation.

== Members ==
Image	Member	Party	Term	Notes
	Tom McVeigh (1930–)	Nationals	1 December 1984 – 29 February 1988	Previously held the Division of Darling Downs. Resigned to retire from politics. Son is John McVeigh
	Bill Taylor (1938–)	Liberal	9 April 1988 – 31 August 1998	Retired
	Ian Macfarlane (1955–)	Liberal	3 October 1998 – 9 May 2016	Served as minister under Howard and Abbott. Retired
	John McVeigh (1965–)	Liberal	2 July 2016 – 18 September 2020	Previously held the Legislative Assembly of Queensland seat of Toowoomba South. Served as minister under Turnbull. Resigned to retire from politics. Father is Tom McVeigh
	Garth Hamilton (1979–)	Liberal	28 November 2020 – present	Incumbent

== Election results ==
2025 Australian federal election: Groom
Party	Candidate	Votes	%	±%
Liberal National	Garth Hamilton	42,302	40.98	−2.74
Independent	Suzie Holt	17,694	17.14	+8.88
Labor	Richard Edwards	17,172	16.64	−2.09
One Nation	Rebecca Konz	9,860	9.55	−0.01
Greens	Alyce Nelligan	5,757	5.58	−0.27
Family First	Alexandra Todd	3,894	3.77	+3.77
Independent	Kirstie Smolenski	3,701	3.59	−3.55
Trumpet of Patriots	Jamie Marr	2,839	2.75	+1.15
Total formal votes		103,219	95.14	−0.14
Informal votes		5,276	4.86	+0.14
Turnout		108,495	91.17	+0.29
Notional two-party-preferred count
Liberal National	Garth Hamilton	65,390	63.35	−0.82
Labor	Richard Edwards	37,829	36.65	+0.82
Two-candidate-preferred result
Liberal National	Garth Hamilton	57,467	55.67	−1.22
Independent	Suzie Holt	45,752	44.33	+1.22
Liberal National hold		Swing	−1.22	
