= Murray Sainsbury =

Australian politician

Member of the Australian Parliament for Eden-Monaro
- In office 13 December 1975 – 5 March 1983
- Preceded by: Bob Whan
- Succeeded by: Jim Snow

Personal details
- Born: 14 September 1940 (age 86) Wollongong, New South Wales
- Party: Liberal Party of Australia
- Education: University of Sydney
- Occupation: Civil engineer

Murray Evan Sainsbury (born 14 September 1940) is an Australian former politician. He was a member of the House of Representatives from 1975 to 1983, representing the Division of Eden-Monaro as a member of the Liberal Party. He was a civil engineer before entering politics.

== Early life ==
Sainsbury was born in Wollongong, New South Wales. He graduated from the University of Sydney with the degrees of Bachelor of Engineering and Bachelor of Economics. He was a qualified civil engineer and operated his own building and construction company.

== Politics ==
Sainsbury was elected to federal parliament in the Coalition's landslide victory at the 1975 federal election, defeating the incumbent Labor MP Bob Whan. He was re-elected in 1977 and 1980, defeated by Labor's Jim Snow in 1983 and failed in an attempt to regain the seat in 1984.

According to Paul Kelly, Sainsbury was part of "the vanguard of the free market lobby within the Liberal Party" along with three other backbenchers (Jim Carlton, John Hyde, and Peter Shack). He briefly served as a deputy government whip from September to December 1981.

In 1982, Sainsbury approached local artist Tom Thompson to depict proceedings of the House of Representatives. Thompson's sketches have been cited as "the first and only occasion that an artist has been permitted to draw in the house", and are now held by the Museum of Australian Democracy.

== Later career ==
In 1991, Sainsbury was appointed CEO of a project management company within the Hindmarsh Group. He had previously worked with the group as a consultant for two years.

As of 2014, Sainsbury was the president of the Association of Former Members of the Parliament of Australia. In a submission to a parliamentary committee on behalf of the organisation, he argued against the abolition of the Life Gold Pass Scheme, which provided former MPs and senators with 10 free return airfares within Australia each year.

Parliament of Australia
Preceded by Bob Whan	Member for Eden-Monaro; 1975–1980	Succeeded by Jim Snow
