= Gary Nairn =

Australian politician (1951–2024)

The Honourable Gary Nairn AO
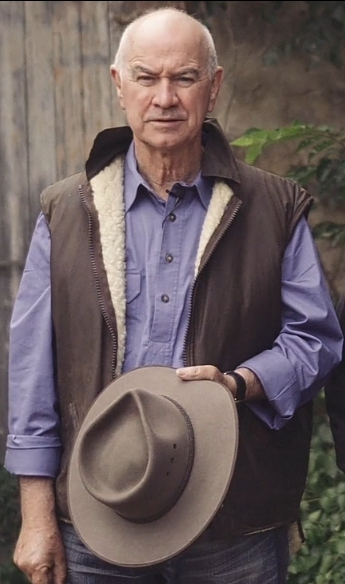
- Nairn in 2018

Special Minister of State
- In office 27 January 2006 – 3 December 2007
- Prime Minister: John Howard
- Preceded by: Eric Abetz
- Succeeded by: John Faulkner

Member of the Australian Parliament for Eden-Monaro
- In office 2 March 1996 – 24 November 2007
- Preceded by: Jim Snow
- Succeeded by: Mike Kelly

Personal details
- Born: 3 January 1951 Sydney, New South Wales, Australia
- Died: 1 June 2024 (aged 73) Queensland, Australia
- Party: Liberal Party of Australia
- Children: 2
- Education: University of New South Wales
- Occupation: Surveyor

Gary Roy Nairn AO (3 January 1951 – 1 June 2024) was an Australian politician.

== Early life ==
Nairn was born in Sydney on 3 January 1951, and was educated at Sydney Boys High School from 1963 to 1968 before attending University of New South Wales. He was a surveyor in private practice and managing director of a surveying and mapping consultancy before entering politics. He moved to the Northern Territory where he lived for many years. He was the President of the Country Liberal Party between 1990 and 1994, during which time the CLP won two elections with an increased vote.

== Federal political career ==
Nairn returned to New South Wales and in March 1996, was elected a Liberal Party of Australia member of the Australian House of Representatives, representing the seat of Eden-Monaro.

In 2003, he headed a federal inquiry into the 2003 Canberra bushfires. He was appointed Parliamentary Secretary to Prime Minister John Howard in October 2004. In January 2006, he was promoted to the front bench as Special Minister of State which included responsibilities with Ministerial and Parliamentary Services, the Australian Government Information Management Office, Australian Electoral Commission, Defence Housing Authority, and Film Australia. He served in Howard's outer ministry.

Nairn's hold on Eden-Monaro was always rather tenuous. It is a noted bellwether seat; it had been held by the party of government continuously from 1972 to 2016, and otherwise was rarely held by an opposition MP. For most of that time, the seat has been highly marginal. Even in the midst of a sizeable swing to the Coalition in 2004, for instance, Nairn only managed a swing of 0.4 percent.

In the 2007 federal election, Nairn lost his seat to Labor candidate Mike Kelly. Nairn was one of five members of the Howard ministry to lose their seats at the election. Howard also lost his own seat of Bennelong.

== Phelps-Kelly controversy ==
In September 2007, Nairn's chief of staff, Peter Phelps, engaged in a heated verbal exchange with the Labor Party candidate for Eden-Monaro, Mike Kelly at a forum on the Iraq War in Queanbeyan, New South Wales. At the meeting Phelps claimed that Mike Kelly was a hypocrite as a former soldier running for the ALP when they are opposed to the war in Iraq. Phelps stated at the meeting that he thought Kelly was using the Nuremberg defence, and compared it to the kind of defence used by guards at the Bergen-Belsen concentration camp. Nairn did not agree with his staffer's sentiments.

== National Spatial Action Agenda, ANZLIC and SIBA ==
During his time in Parliament, Nairn worked closely with Warwick Watkins who was the Chairman of ANZLIC, the Australian New Zealand Land Information Council (also known as the Spatial Information Council) to advocate federal government support for the National Spatial Action Agenda and other related initiatives including the Australian Spatial Consortium (ASC) and the Cooperative Research Centre, CRC for Spatial Information (CRC-SI). Further, Nairn worked closely with the Australian Spatial Information Business Association (ASIBA), which later changed its name to the Spatial Information Business Association (SIBA), to support the agenda.

Nairn advocated the Agenda to the Prime Minister and the Cabinet and was supported by ASIBA and ANZLIC throughout. Arising from these efforts, Warren Entsch, then Parliamentary Secretary to the Minister for Industry, Science and Resources, launched the establishment of a steering group to drive the Spatial Information Industry Action Agenda in November 2000.

The Action Agenda was released in September 2001. Under the Spatial Information Industry Action Agenda, on 25 September 2001, then Minister for Industry, Science and Resources, Senator Nick Minchin announced a $2 million Grant to a consortium of private "spatial firms" to increase the effectiveness of spatial information. ASIBA was identified as the industry body to lead most of the responsibility under the action agenda. Minchin also identified the key intergovernmental roles of ANZLIC under the Action Agenda. Nairn continued his support for the agenda until he lost his federal seat in November 2007 election. Thereafter, he remained engaged through ASIBA/SIBA. In 2012, Nairn was appointed the Chair of SIBA.

Nairn, in his role as Special Minister of State, announced the establishment of ASC, with initial membership including ANZLIC, ASIBA and CRC-SI. Watkins was designated as Chairman of the ASC Steering Committee. ASC was reported as being established “to accelerate the unlocking of the potential of spatial information for economic, environmental and social benefit for Australia within key industries, and the development of tools, new technologies and capabilities relating to the fundamental future needs of the nation.” The actual role and achievements, if any of ASC, remain vague.

Under the National Spatial Information Industry Action Agenda, the CRC-SI was established in 2003 and launched by Nairn after significant advocacy by ANZLIC led by Watkins and also ASIBA. In its 2011-12 Annual Report (page 12), CRC-SI reported that Watkins, a Director of CRC-SI since inception, had resigned from the CRC-SI Board following his retirement from the NSW Public Service. The CRC-SI reporting was false as Watkins was officially sacked by the NSW government.

== Centre for Spatial Data Infrastructures and Land Administration (CSDILA), University of Melbourne ==
Nairn chaired the CSDILA Advisory Committee until his death.

== Other ==
From 2018 to 2024, Nairn was the Chairman of The Duke of Edinburgh's International Award of Australia where he oversaw major restructuring and record growth in the use of the Duke of Edinburgh in Australia.

== Personal life and death ==
Nairn was married to Rose. His first wife, Kerrie, died from cancer in 2005. They had two children.

Nairn died from cancer in Queensland, on 1 June 2024, aged 73.

Parliament of Australia
Political offices
Preceded by Eric Abetz	Special Minister of State; 2006–2007	Succeeded by John Faulkner
Australian House of Representatives
Preceded by Jim Snow	Member for Eden-Monaro; 1996–2007	Succeeded by Mike Kelly
