= Jim Snow =

Australian politician (1934–2025)

Member of the Australian Parliament for Eden-Monaro
- In office 5 March 1983 – 2 March 1996
- Preceded by: Murray Sainsbury
- Succeeded by: Gary Nairn

Personal details
- Born: James Henry Snow; 15 September 1934 Surrey Hills, Victoria, Australia
- Died: 18 September 2025 (aged 91)
- Party: Labor
- Spouse: Lesley Snow
- Education: Victorian College of Pharmacy (now Monash University)
- Profession: Pharmacist

James Henry Snow (15 September 1934 – 18 September 2025) was an Australian politician.

== Background ==
Snow was born in the Melbourne suburb of Surrey Hills, Victoria on 15 September 1934. He graduated in pharmacy from the Victorian College of Pharmacy. He worked as a goat farmer, pharmacist and community worker for Queanbeyan City Council. Snow died in September 2025, aged 90 or 91.

== Political career ==
Snow was elected to the Australian House of Representatives as the member for Eden-Monaro in 1983. He was defeated by Gary Nairn in the 1996 election. Prior to parliament Jim Snow was an honorary lieutenant (pharmacist) in the military reserve of officers for some years. Snow chaired the government (Parliamentary Labor Party) caucus from 1993 to 1996 after chairing the Transport and Communications Policy Committee. He was also Convenor of the Pharmaceutical Benefits Working Group and the Land Transport and Postal Services Working group. He convened 'search conferences' to find solutions and resolve conflicts in both local and national issues, including two on the need to control feral animals, the first of which was followed by the first National Feral Animal control program. Those and other search conferences brought together local and national expertise and were facilitated by Dr Alistair Crombie of the Australian National University, Geoff Pryor, Penny Lockwood, Kevin Hambly, and Justin Mahon.

The search conferences also dealt with Land Transport, Fishing and Abalone issues, recycling human waste and the future of Barunguba / Montague Island following the controversial automation of the lighthouse. The latter conference led to agreement to have national parks supervision and a human presence on the island. Snow moved a private member motion (House of Representatives Hansard, 17 December 1992) that the parliament deal with drug-related crime, health and social problems by initiating the availability of heroin, cocaine and amphetamines on prescription by addiction trained physicians and dispensers. On 18 November 1993 he moved that the executive move for constitutional change to remove state governments and reform and strengthen local government. Neither motion reached a vote. Snow lost his

After losing his seat in the 1996 federal election, Jim Snow and his wife, Lesley, worked with Aboriginal organisations and he became patron of Winnunga Nimmityjah Aboriginal Medical Service. He was a foundation member of the Drug Law Reform Foundation and served as co-convenor of Beyond Federation which seeks constitutional reform, including the removal of the state tier of government and he serves as a member of Home in Queanbeyan, an initiative providing accommodation and care to the mentally ill. He has edited four editions of the After Parliament Guide printed by the parliament to assist former members in their transition from parliamentary life. He was made a life member of the Australian Labor Party.

Snow was one of three members of the ALP Caucus who were absent (he was ill) in the vote that saw Paul Keating oust Bob Hawke as Prime Minister and ALP leader in December 1991. The others were Foreign Minister Gareth Evans who was out of the country and Con Sciacca who was instead with his dying son.

Parliament of Australia
Preceded by Murray Sainsbury	Member for Eden-Monaro; 1983–1996	Succeeded by Gary Nairn
