= Peter Hendy (Australian politician) =

Australian politician

The Honourable Dr Peter Hendy
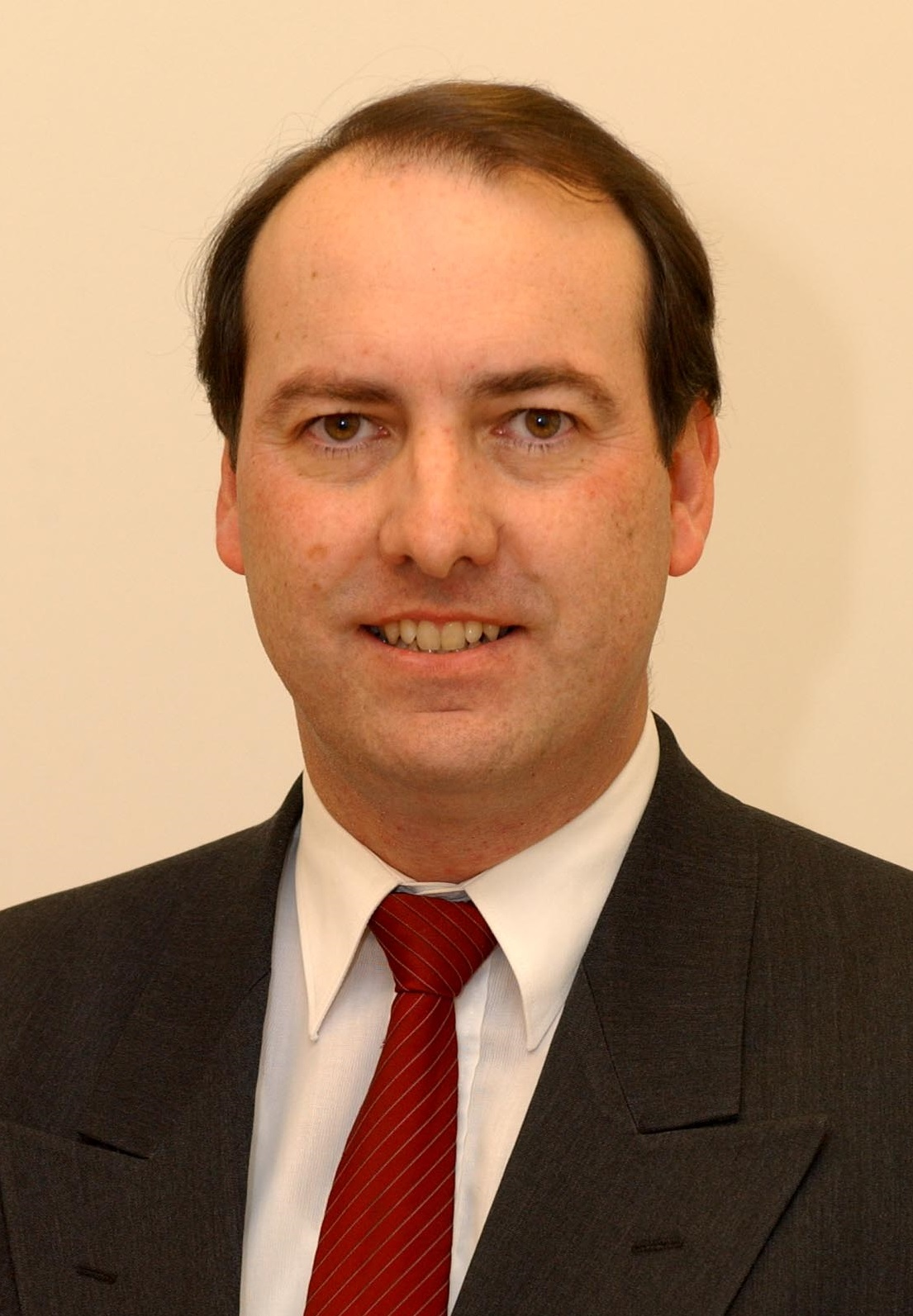

Member of the Australian Parliament for Eden-Monaro
- In office 7 September 2013 – 2 July 2016
- Preceded by: Mike Kelly
- Succeeded by: Mike Kelly

Personal details
- Born: 10 January 1962 (age 64) Brisbane, Queensland, Australia
- Party: Liberal Party of Australia
- Spouse: Bronwyn
- Children: 2
- Education: University of Queensland; Australian National University; University of Canberra
- Profession: Economist, Political advisor and Politician

Peter William Hendy (born 10 January 1962) is a former Australian politician. He was the Liberal member representing the Australian House of Representatives seat of Eden-Monaro in New South Wales from 2013 to 2016. Hendy served as Assistant Minister for Productivity in the First Turnbull Ministry between September 2015 and February 2016; and as Assistant Cabinet Secretary and Assistant Minister to the Minister for Finance from February 2016. Hendy lost his seat in the 2016 federal election to Labor candidate Mike Kelly.

== Early life ==
Hendy was born in Brisbane and educated at the University of Queensland where he graduated with a Bachelor of Economics (with First Class Honours). He then undertook a scholarship in international economic relations at the Australian National University and has published various papers and articles on public policy issues.

== Professional career ==
Hendy worked in public administration and policy development at Federal and State levels, including periods in the Commonwealth Treasury, New South Wales Cabinet Office and as Chief of Staff to the Minister for Defence, Workplace Relations and Education, Peter Reith.

In 2001, Hendy was implicated in the Children Overboard affair as Chief of Staff to the Minister for Defence. A Senate Committee inquiry into the incident found the Committee did not hear "any compelling evidence that Mr. Reith’s staff acted in any way other than honestly and in good faith."

In June 2002 Hendy became chief executive officer of the Australian Chamber of Commerce and Industry (ACCI). During his tenure at ACCI, Hendy was an advocate for workplace relations improvements. In 2006 he was commissioned by the Federal Treasurer to co-author the International Comparison of Australia's Taxes report, urging long term taxation reform in Australia.

In 2005, Hendy was included in the Australian Financial Review's Inside Power magazine, which lists the most influential people in the Australian political system, as a "key player" in the then industrial relations debate by "straddling both business and government."

In January 2008 Hendy left the ACCI to take up a position as Chief of Staff to Liberal leader, Brendan Nelson. He was one of three ACCI officials who joined Nelson's staff at the time.

Hendy has at various times been a director of Standards Australia, the International Chamber of Commerce (Australia), the Australian Institute of International Affairs, the Australian Made Campaign Limited, the National Business Action Fund, a governor of the National Institute of Labour Studies, Chairman of the Joint Policy Committee of the Confederation of Asia-Pacific Chambers of Commerce and Industry and the Australian representative on the Business and Industry Advisory Committee (BIAC) of the OECD.

== Parliament ==
At the 2013 federal election, Hendy successfully contested the bellwether seat of Eden-Monaro; winning the seat with a two-party vote of 50.6 percent from a two-party swing of 4.9 percent.

In 2015, following the release of journalist Peter van Onselen's book, Battleground: Why the Liberal Party Shirtfronted Tony Abbott, Hendy came under media attention for his role in the September 2015 Liberal Party leadership spill that saw Malcolm Turnbull replace Tony Abbott as party leader. In his book, van Onselen revealed a meeting of Turnbull supporters took place in Hendy's Queanbeyan home the night before Turnbull mounted his leadership challenge.

Hendy was promoted to Assistant Minister for Productivity following the leadership change to Malcolm Turnbull in September 2015 in the First Turnbull Ministry. On 13 February 2016, it was announced that Hendy would be appointed as Assistant Cabinet Secretary and Assistant Minister to the Minister for Finance following a rearrangement in the ministry.

The federal election held on 2 July 2016 saw Hendy lose the seat, with Eden-Monaro returning to Labor's Mike Kelly.

== Honours ==
Hendy was awarded the Centenary Medal in 2003 by the Governor-General of Australia for "service to Australian society in business leadership”.

== Personal life ==
Hendy lives in Queanbeyan and is married to Bronwyn Hendy with two children.

== Published works ==
- Captains of Industry - Biographies of the Presidents of the Australian Chamber of Commerce and Industry (2008) (Melbourne University Press) ISBN 9780522855746

Parliament of Australia
Preceded by Mike Kelly	Member for Eden-Monaro; 2013–2016	Succeeded by Mike Kelly
Political offices
Preceded by Scott Ryan	Assistant Cabinet Secretary; 2016–present	Incumbent
Preceded by Himself as Assistant Minister for Productivity	Assistant Minister to the Minister for Finance; 2016–present	Incumbent
