= Division of Eden-Monaro =

Australian federal electoral division

Coordinates: 36.292°S 149.344°E

Eden-Monaro Australian House of Representatives Division
- Interactive map of electorate boundaries from the 2025 federal election
- Created: 1901
- MP: Kristy McBain
- Party: Labor
- Namesake: Eden and Monaro
- Electors: 121,441 (2025)
- Area: 31,913 km^{2} (12,321.7 sq mi)
- Demographic: Rural
Electorates around Eden-Monaro:
Riverina	Riverina	Whitlam
ACT	Eden-Monaro	Gilmore; Pacific Ocean
Riverina	Gippsland (VIC)	Pacific Ocean

The Division of Eden-Monaro (/ˈiːdən məˈnɛəroʊ/ EE-dən mə-NAIR-oh) is an Australian electoral division in the state of New South Wales. It includes the cities of Queanbeyan, Goulburn, Cooma, Bega and Eden. It is currently represented by Labor MP Kristy McBain.

== Geography ==
Since 1984, federal electoral division boundaries in Australia have been determined at redistributions by a redistribution committee appointed by the Australian Electoral Commission. Redistributions occur for the boundaries of divisions in a particular state, and they occur every seven years, or sooner if a state's representation entitlement changes or when divisions of a state are malapportioned.

Throughout its history, the division has always covered the south-eastern corner of New South Wales by the Victorian border, which includes the state's South Coast. Its boundaries have changed relatively little compared to adjacent electoral divisions. It has occasionally completely surrounded the Australian Capital Territory (ACT), but otherwise it has been generally east of the territory.

When the division was created in 1900, it originally extended to the Molonglo River in the north-west (bordering Werriwa, within what was later Canberra, ), St Georges Basin in the north-east (bordering Illawarra, near what was later Jervis Bay Territory) and the Great Dividing Range and the Brindabellas in the west (bordering Hume. In 1906, it gained a small area north of the Molonglo River that included Lake George.

In 1913, Eden-Monaro ceded the area that had become the Federal Capital Territory, which became an enclave within Eden-Monaro. It also expanded northwards up to Yass in the north-west and Berry in the north-east from Werriwa and Illwarra respectively. Following the abolition of Illawarra in 1922, Eden-Monaro was further expanded northwards, stopping short of the Wollongong city centre. It also gained parts of the Southern Highlands up to Bowral. In 1934, it lost areas to the north-west including Yass to Hume and lost Dapto to Werriwa, but gained Goulburn from Werriwa. It also no longer surrounded the Federal Capital Territory.

In 1949, it lost a significant portion of Southern Highlands, South Coast and the Illawarra regions to the new Division of Macarthur. From then until 1984, the division had only minor boundary changes during redistributions, with no losses or gains of major settlements. All the minor boundary changes were also only in the area north-west of Goulburn.

In 1984, the division lost its northern one-third, including Goulburn, to form the new Division of Gilmore. The northern boundary was cut back to Bungendore and Milton, with no changes to the western boundary (the boundary of Snowy River Shire). In 1992, it lost coastal areas north of Batemans Bay.

In 2000, the division was slightly expanded to the west to fully surround the ACT for second time in its history, though most of these new areas are national parks and state forests with little population. These small gains were reversed in 2006. However, in that same year, the division lost Batemans Bay to Gilmore, but gained areas further west to include Tumut Shire and Tumbarumba Shire. In 2009, the boundaries were largely reverted to its pre-2000 boundaries.

In the February 2016 redistribution, the boundaries were once again reverted to its pre-2009 boundaries, losing Batemans Bay and regaining the Tumut and Tumbarumba shires (which merged to form Snowy Valleys Council later that year). It also additionally gained the Yass Valley local government area to the north including Yass, which it last covered before 1934. The division also fully surrounded the ACT for the third time in its history. At the 2024 distribution, it lost the Snowy Valleys and Yass Valley local government areas and once gain no longer surrounded the ACT. However, it gained the Goulburn Mulwaree local government area from Hume, including Goulburn which it last covered before 1984. It also gained the small town of Tuross Head from Gilmore.

Since 2025, Eden-Monaro covers the entirety of the local government areas of Goulburn Mulwaree Council, Queanbeyan–Palerang Regional Council, Snowy Monaro Regional Council and Bega Valley Shire, as well as the southern part of Eurobodalla Shire. Towns within Eurobodalla include Narooma, Bodalla and Tuross Head. Outside of Eurobadalla, the division includes the cities of Queanbeyan and Goulburn and the towns of Bega and Cooma.

== History ==
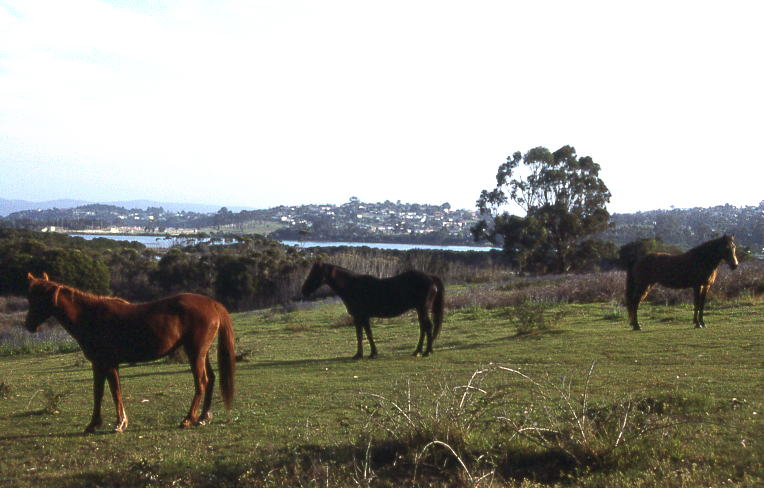
The town of Eden and

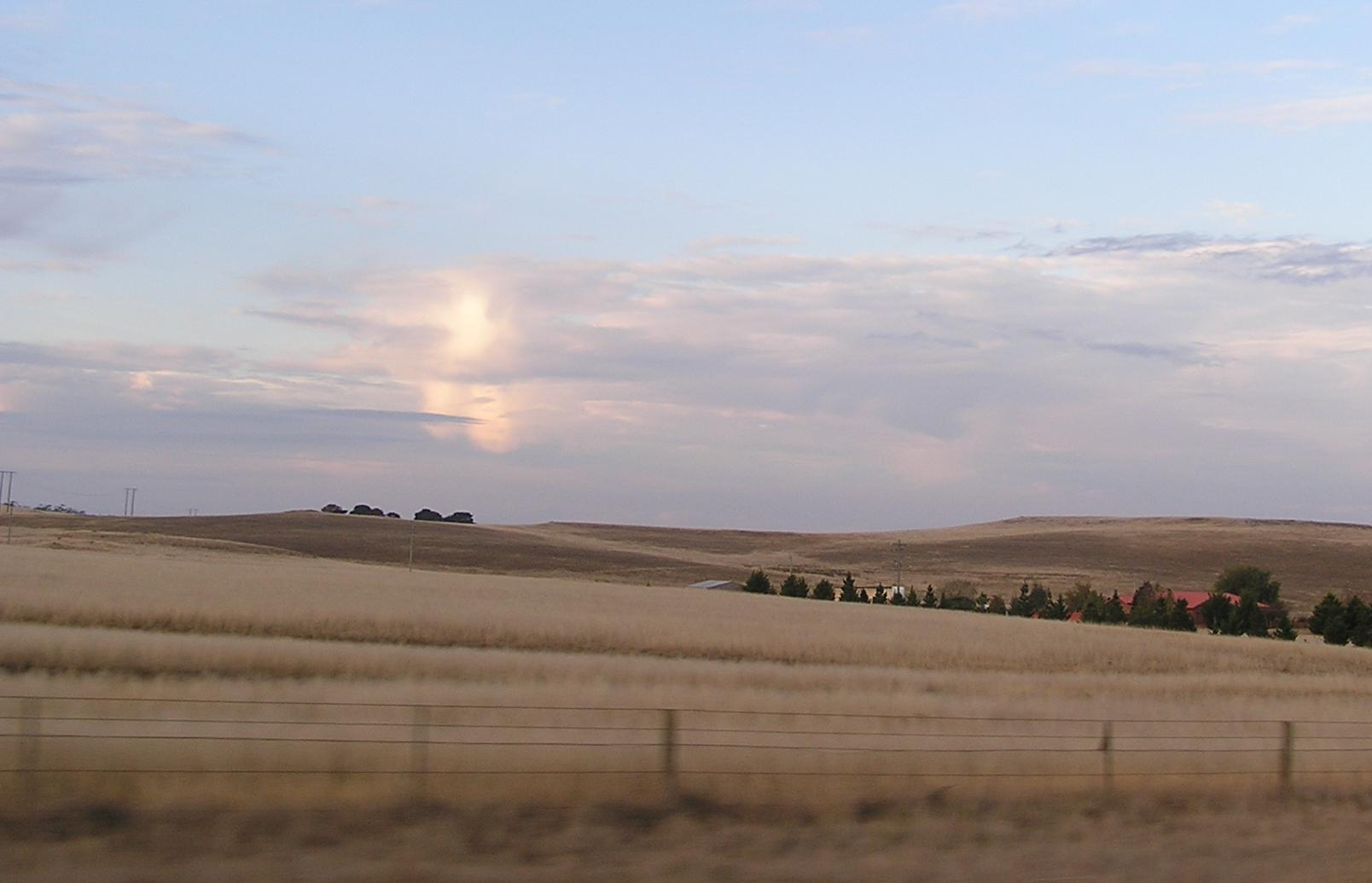
the region of Monaro, the division's namesakes

The division was proclaimed in 1900, and was one of the original 65 divisions to be contested at the first federal election. It is named for the town of Eden and the Monaro district of southern New South Wales.

Until 1943 non-Labor parties held the seat for all but three years. Since then, it has been consistently marginal, split between provincial territory that votes strongly for Labor and rural areas that vote equally strongly for the Liberals (and their predecessors) or the Nationals. However, it was in Labor hands for all but one term from 1943 to 1975.

Up to the 2016 election, Eden-Monaro was long regarded as Australia's most well-known "bellwether seat". From 1972 to 2013, Eden-Monaro was won by the party that also won the election. During this time, all its sitting members were defeated at the polls – none retired or resigned.

Liberal incumbent Peter Hendy was defeated by Labor's Mike Kelly at the 2016 election. Kelly had previously represented Eden-Monaro from 2007 to 2013. Kelly's 2016 victory made him the seat's first opposition MP elected at an election since 1969. The nation's new bellwether became the seat of Robertson – continually won by the party that also won government since the 1983 election. "Best" bellwether aside, ABC psephologist Antony Green classed a total of eleven electorates as bellwethers in his 2016 election guide.

Labor’s Kristy McBain became the first woman to represent the division when she narrowly held the seat in the 2020 Eden-Monaro by-election. At the 2022 election, she held the seat with a large swing to her, boosting her two-party margin to 8 points, the strongest result in the seat for either side of politics since 1934.

== Members ==
Image	Member	Party	Term	Notes
	Sir Austin Chapman (1864–1926)	Protectionist	29 March 1901 – 26 May 1909	Previously held the New South Wales Legislative Assembly seat of Braidwood. Served as Chief Government Whip in the House under Barton. Served as minister under Deakin and Bruce. Died in office
	Sir Austin Chapman (1864–1926)	Liberal	26 May 1909 – 17 February 1917	Previously held the New South Wales Legislative Assembly seat of Braidwood. Served as Chief Government Whip in the House under Barton. Served as minister under Deakin and Bruce. Died in office
	Sir Austin Chapman (1864–1926)	Nationalist	17 February 1917 – 12 January 1926	Previously held the New South Wales Legislative Assembly seat of Braidwood. Served as Chief Government Whip in the House under Barton. Served as minister under Deakin and Bruce. Died in office
	John Perkins (1878–1954)	Nationalist	6 March 1926 – 12 October 1929	Previously held the New South Wales Legislative Assembly seat of Goulburn. Served as Chief Government Whip in the House under Bruce. Lost seat
	John Cusack (1868–1956)	Labor	12 October 1929 – 19 December 1931	Previously held the New South Wales Legislative Assembly seat of Albury. Did not contest in 1931. Failed to win the Division of Cowper
	John Perkins (1878–1954)	United Australia	19 December 1931 – 21 August 1943	Served as minister under Lyons, Page and Menzies. Lost seat
	Allan Fraser (1902–1977)	Labor	21 August 1943 – 26 November 1966	Lost seat
	Dugald Munro (1930–1973)	Liberal	26 November 1966 – 25 October 1969	Lost seat
	Allan Fraser (1902–1977)	Labor	25 October 1969 – 2 November 1972	Retired. Later elected to the Australian Capital Territory House of Assembly seat of Fraser in 1975
	Bob Whan (1933–2015)	Labor	2 December 1972 – 13 December 1975	Lost seat
	Murray Sainsbury (1940–)	Liberal	13 December 1975 – 5 March 1983	Lost seat
	Jim Snow (1934–2025)	Labor	5 March 1983 – 2 March 1996	Lost seat
	Gary Nairn (1951–2024)	Liberal	2 March 1996 – 24 November 2007	Served as minister under Howard. Lost seat
	Mike Kelly (1960–)	Labor	24 November 2007 – 7 September 2013	Served as minister under Gillard and Rudd. Lost seat
	Peter Hendy (1962–)	Liberal	7 September 2013 – 2 July 2016	Served as minister under Abbott and Turnbull. Lost seat
	Mike Kelly (1960–)	Labor	2 July 2016 – 30 April 2020	Resigned due to ill health
	Kristy McBain (1982–)	Labor	4 July 2020 – present	Incumbent. Currently a minister under Albanese

== Election results ==
2025 Australian federal election: Eden-Monaro
Party	Candidate	Votes	%	±%
Labor	Kristy McBain	46,088	43.04	+4.54
Liberal	Jo van der Plaat	34,142	31.88	−2.49
Greens	Emma Goward	10,739	10.03	+1.45
One Nation	Richard Graham	7,451	6.96	+2.59
Trumpet of Patriots	Wade Cox	2,587	2.42	+2.42
Independent	Andrew Thaler	2,499	2.33	+0.69
HEART	Fraser Buchanan	1,881	1.76	+1.05
Independent	Brian Fisher	1,701	1.59	+1.59
Total formal votes		107,088	94.02	+0.48
Informal votes		6,808	5.98	−0.48
Turnout		113,896	93.84	+0.95
Two-party-preferred result
Labor	Kristy McBain	61,270	57.21	+1.13
Liberal	Jo van der Plaat	45,818	42.79	−1.13
Labor hold		Swing	+1.13	
