= Mike Kelly (Australian politician) =

Australian politician (born 1960)

Colonel The Honourable Mike Kelly AM
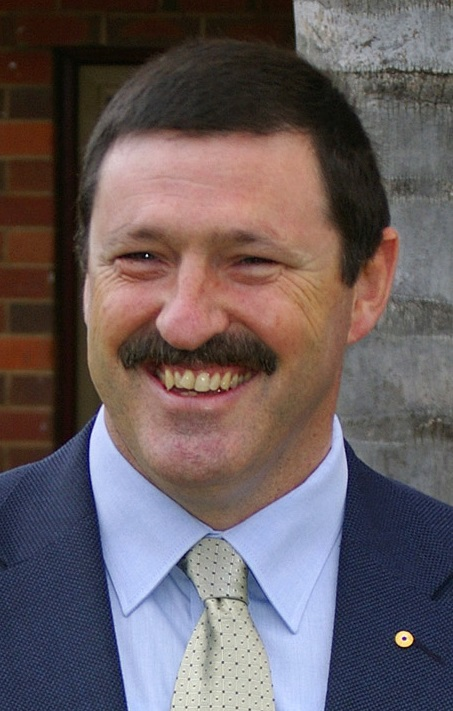
- Kelly at the Wagga RAAF Museum in 2008

Member of the Australian Parliament for Eden-Monaro
- In office 2 July 2016 – 30 April 2020
- Preceded by: Peter Hendy
- Succeeded by: Kristy McBain
- In office 24 November 2007 – 7 September 2013
- Preceded by: Gary Nairn
- Succeeded by: Peter Hendy

Minister for Defence Materiel
- In office 4 February 2013 – 7 September 2013
- Prime Minister: Julia Gillard; Kevin Rudd
- Preceded by: Jason Clare
- Succeeded by: Office abolished

Personal details
- Born: 23 February 1960 (age 66) Adelaide, South Australia, Australia
- Party: Labor Party
- Spouse: Rachelle Sakker-Kelly
- Children: 1
- Education: Macquarie University; University of New South Wales
- Occupation: Lawyer; Soldier; Politician
- Website: https://mikekelly.org.au/

Military service
- Allegiance: Australia
- Branch/service: Australian Army
- Years of service: 1987–2007
- Rank: Colonel
- Battles/wars: Bosnian War; Operation Restore Hope; International Force for East Timor; Iraq War
- Awards: Member of the Order of Australia

Colonel Michael Joseph Kelly, AM (born 23 February 1960) is an Australian former politician who twice represented the Division of Eden-Monaro in the Parliament of Australia, from 2007 to 2013 and again from 2016 to 2020. He is a member of the Australian Labor Party (ALP).

Kelly was born in Adelaide and studied law at Macquarie University before joining the Australian Army in 1987. He went on to serve in Somalia, East Timor, Bosnia and Iraq. He was among senior Australian military personnel in the Iraq War. Kelly finished his military career in 2007 with the rank of colonel as Director of Army Legal Services.

Kelly was first elected to the House of Representatives for the Division of Eden-Monaro at the 2007 federal election and was immediately appointed as Parliamentary Secretary for Defence Support. Following the 2010 federal election, Kelly was appointed as Parliamentary Secretary for Agriculture, Fisheries and Forestry. In December 2011, he was appointed as Parliamentary Secretary for Defence in a reshuffle of the Government. In a third reshuffle in early 2013, Kelly was promoted to the outer ministry as Minister for Defence Materiel, a position he held from March to September that year.

Following the 2013 federal election, Kelly lost his seat to Liberal candidate Peter Hendy but regained the seat in the 2016 federal election. He is the first person to serve in opposition as the member for the Division of Eden-Monaro since 1972. He was the shadow Assistant Minister for Defence Industry and Support.

On 30 April 2020, Kelly announced his resignation from Parliament due to personal and family health issues. Ten days later, he said he had taken up a job offer with Palantir Technologies.

== Early life ==
Kelly was born in Adelaide on 23 February 1960. He attended Asquith Boys High School in Sydney. He then studied at Macquarie University and graduated in 1983 with a Bachelor of Arts and Bachelor of Laws.

== Military service ==
Kelly joined the Australian Army, specifically the Australian Army Legal Corps, in 1987.

=== Somalia ===
Kelly was deployed and served in Operation Restore Hope in Somalia from 1992 to 1993. He was awarded the Chief of the General Staff Commendation for his service and, in 1994, was made a Member of the Order of Australia in recognition of his work in Somalia.

==== Trial of Hussan Gutaale Abdul ====
In Somalia, Kelly was actively involved in the prosecution of the warlord Hussan Gutaale Abdul. Gutaale, who among many other things had attacked and killed 16 aid workers and repeatedly driven an armoured car into emaciated refugees awaiting food distribution, was arrested by an Australian patrol, held in a cage at Baidoa airport and later flown to Mogadishu to be held by US forces. He was found guilty of 31 counts of murder by a panel of three judges and sentenced to 20 years' hard labour.

Appeals were immediately made, with the prosecution demanding the death penalty mandatory for murder under the Somali Penal Code. A panel of six judges heard the appeal, upheld the previous verdicts and imposed the sentence of death to be carried out forthwith. "The court erupted in mayhem" and Gutaale physically attacked Kelly. Eventually a group of engineers arrived, Gutaale was handcuffed and Kelly wrestled him along the roadway to his place of execution. Gutaale was handed over to the Somali police and executed on the spot. Kelly later recalled:

Before I left Australia I had my own views on capital punishment. I was leaning fairly heavily towards the negative side. But the death of Gutaale was far more than an execution following a criminal conviction, it was more an act of communal self defence. If I was moved in any way, it was seeing Gutaale's mother in the court. She was concerned and upset, but having sat through countless statements from people who had suffered from what he had done and not just killings, but cruel killings and senseless brutality I knew too much of what he had done, and what he was capable of. I couldn't, have any sympathy for him ... I have absolutely no personal regrets about Gutaale's execution ... I'll have to admit that even when I saw him wallowing in his own blood and excrement I felt no remorse or pity, only relief. There was no other way of stopping him.

— Colonel Mike Kelly, The Canberra Times, 10 October 2007.

=== Bosnia-Herzegovina ===
Kelly was also deployed during the Bosnian War, which occurred from 1992 to 1995. In 1996, Kelly was part of a successful hostage recovery mission in Kenya.

Following the Bosnian War, Kelly obtained a Doctorate of Philosophy from the University of New South Wales in 1997. The research work undertaken for his doctoral dissertation has subsequently formed the basis for two books: Peace Operations: Tackling the Military, Legal and Policy Challenges (1997) and Restoring and Maintaining Order in Complex Peace Operations: The Search for a Legal Framework (1999).

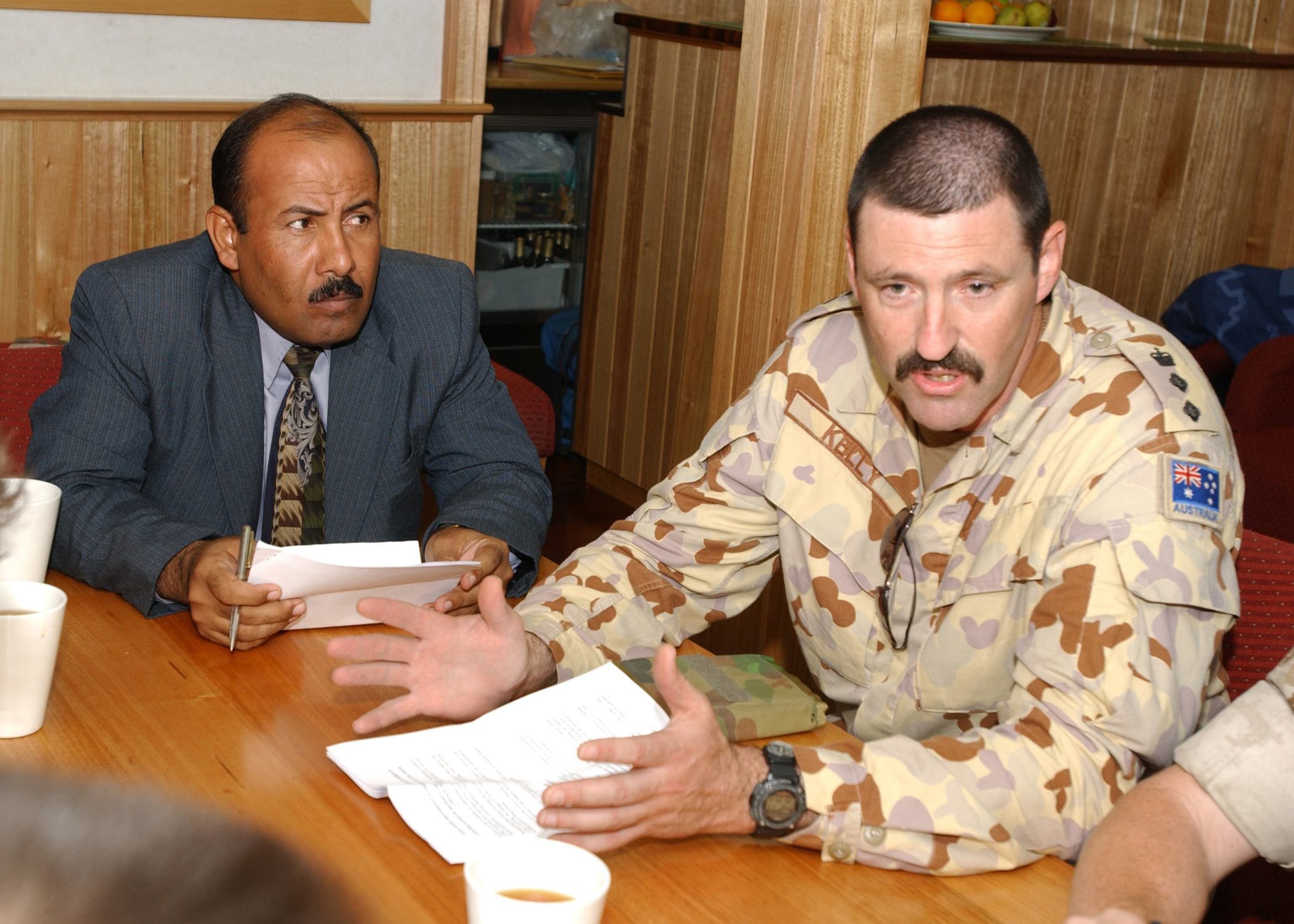
Colonel Mike Kelly (right) during his deployment to Iraq in 2003.

=== East Timor ===
Kelly then served in the peacekeeping mission in East Timor from 1999 to 2000. He received the United Nations Force Commander's commendation in 2002 for his service there.

=== Iraq ===
Kelly was among senior Australian personnel deployed in Iraq during the Iraq War. In June 2003, he inspected detention facilities in Iraq, including those at Abu Ghraib, and reported to the Australian Government on the treatment of detainees.

=== Retirement ===
He finished his military career in 2007 with the rank of colonel as Director of Army Legal Services.

== Political career ==
=== Entry into politics ===
In the 2007 federal election, Kelly stood as the Labor candidate for the marginal New South Wales country electorate of Eden-Monaro, regarded as a "Bellwether seat".

He was criticised by his opponent, long-standing Liberal member Gary Nairn for not residing in the electorate before his nomination and for not facing a local preselection. Nairn's chief of staff also publicly likened Kelly to a Belsen Nazi concentration camp guard for serving in the military in Iraq despite opposing the war itself. The reference became a high-profile campaign issue, with claims that Nairn's office had subsequently promoted the claim using public rather than party funds. The comment was subsequently withdrawn and an apology forwarded to media outlets and to Kelly.

=== Rudd–Gillard governments ===
At the 2007 federal election on 24 November, Kelly won the seat with a 6.67% two-party-preferred swing, and was appointed Parliamentary Secretary for Defence Support in the incoming Rudd Government.

In 2008, after a prolonged and acrimonious debate within Australian veteran and political circles, Kelly formally acknowledged the existence of the 2nd D&E Platoon, a platoon of infantrymen that had been involved in a most successful ambush at Thua Tich on 29 May 1969 under the leadership of Corporal James Riddle. All trace of the platoon had disappeared from the records of the Vietnam War and had compromised the service histories of the 39 men who had served in it.

After a redistribution changed the boundaries of Eden-Monaro, Kelly defeated Liberal candidate David Gazard in the 2010 federal election with a swing of 2%. As a result of the re-elected Labor Government's regional focus, Kelly was appointed as Parliamentary Secretary for Agriculture, Fisheries and Forestry in September 2010. In December 2011, he was appointed as Parliamentary Secretary for Defence in a reshuffle of the Government.

In a third reshuffle in early 2013, Kelly was promoted to the outer ministry and replaced Jason Clare as Minister for Defence Materiel.

In November 2012, Kelly was sued by Lynton Crosby for alleging on Twitter that Crosby had used push polling. The case was eventually discontinued in 2015 by Crosby Textor after Kelly issued an apology which explained that his tweet had concerned a poll from 1995 in which Textor was involved before Crosby Textor's business had commenced.

=== 2013 onwards ===
At the 2013 federal election, Kelly lost his seat to the Liberal Party candidate Peter Hendy.

Preselected as the Labor candidate for Eden-Monaro in May 2015, Kelly defeated Hendy and regained the seat at the 2016 federal election becoming the seat's first opposition member since 1972. Moreover, it was the first time since 1969 that the non-Labor side had been in government without holding Eden-Monaro.

Kelly supports same-sex marriage.

In September 2018, Kelly was the target of two antisemitic attacks. The first attack was when a neo-Nazi sticker with the words "Antipodean Resistance" was placed on his Bega electorate office window. The second incident was when pig's blood and pork was thrown at his Queanbeyan electorate office. Kelly is a supporter of Israel and his wife and son are Jewish.

=== Retirement from politics ===
On 30 April 2020, Kelly announced his resignation from Parliament and retirement from politics due to personal health issues. He also said he wanted to support his wife as she went through her own health issues. Ten days later, he announced he had taken a position at Palantir Technologies. He said that his role would allow him to "work within [his] physical limitations but still be in a position to make a difference in relation to the issues that matter to [him]".

== Personal life ==
Kelly is married to Rachelle and has one son. In October 2019 Kelly collapsed and was taken to hospital for emergency surgery. He had renal failure which he attributes to severe dehydration during his overseas military service. Kelly underwent 10 medical procedures in 6 months. His health issues, and also his wife having health problems, led to him announcing his retirement from politics.

== Honours, decorations and awards ==

Clasp	Award	Clasp/Notes	Date awarded	Reference
	Member of the Order of Australia (AM)		13 June 1994	
	Australian Active Service Medal	with 3 Clasps, Somalia, Timor Leste and Iraq		
	Iraq Medal			
	Australian Service Medal	with 1 Clasp, Balkans		
	Defence Long Service Medal	with one Rosette for 20–24 years service		
	Australian Defence Medal			
	United Nations Medal	for United Nations Integrated Mission in East Timor (UNMIT)		

== See also ==
- First Rudd Ministry
- Second Rudd Ministry

Parliament of Australia
Preceded by Gary Nairn	Member for Eden-Monaro; 2007–2013	Succeeded by Peter Hendy
Preceded by Peter Hendy	Member for Eden-Monaro; 2016–2020	Succeeded by Kristy McBain
Political offices
Preceded by Jason Clare	Minister for Defence Materiel; 2013	Succeeded by None
