= Wildlife of Christmas Island =

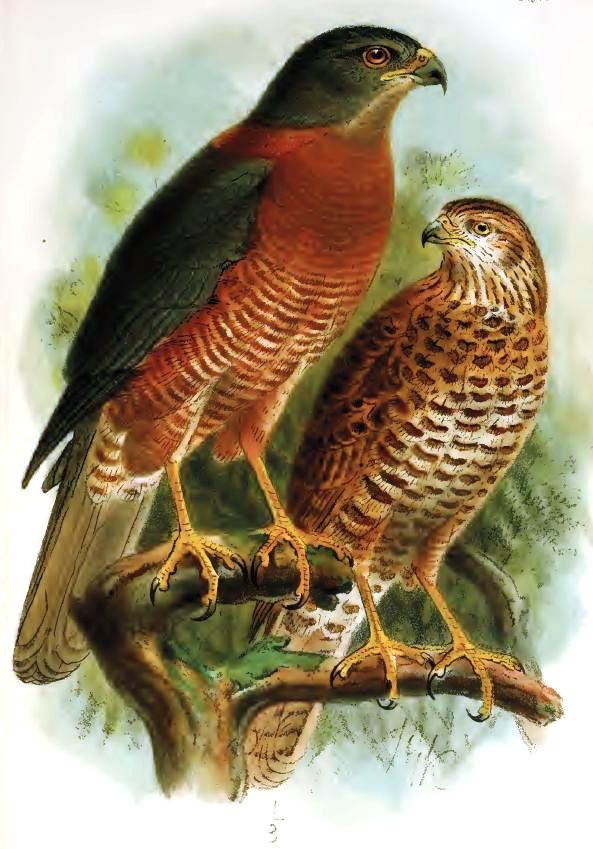
Christmas goshawks

The wildlife of Christmas Island is composed of the flora and fauna of this isolated island in the tropical Indian Ocean. Christmas Island is the summit plateau of an underwater volcano. It is mostly clad in tropical rainforest and has karst, cliffs, wetlands, coasts and sea. It is a small island with a land area of 135 km^{2} (52 mi^{2}), 63% of which has been declared a National park. Most of the rainforest remains intact and supports a large range of endemic species of animals and plants.

== Geography ==
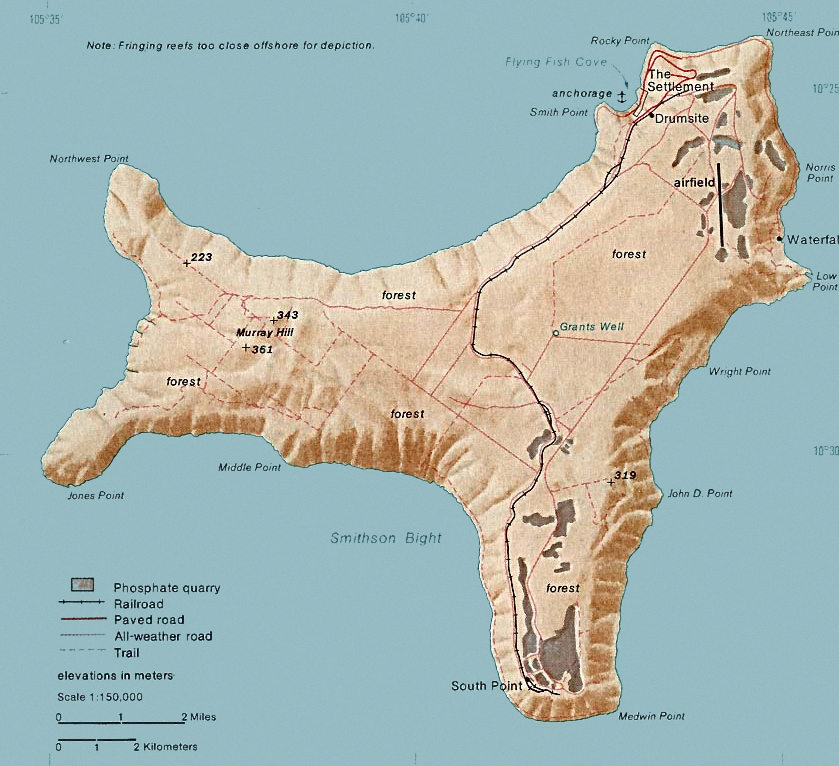
Topography of Christmas Island

The island is about 19 kilometres (12 mi) long and 14.5 km (9.0 mi) wide. The total land area is 135 square kilometres (52 sq mi), with 138.9 km (86.3 mi) of coastline. The island is the flat summit of an underwater volcano more than 4,500 m (14,800 ft) high, with about 4,200 m (13,800 ft) being submerged and only about 300 m (1,000 ft) above the surface. Some basalt is exposed in places but most of the surface rock is limestone accumulated from coral growth. The karst terrain supports numerous anchialine pools. Steep cliffs along much of the coast rise abruptly to a central plateau. The island is mainly covered by tropical rainforest, much of which remains intact. Two thirds of the island is included in the Christmas Island National Park which includes rainforests, wetlands, cliffs, shore and coral reefs.

The climate is tropical and temperatures vary little throughout the year. The highest temperature of around 29 °C (84 °F) usually occurs in March and April, while the lowest temperature is around 23 °C (73 °F) in August. There is a dry season from July to October with only occasional showers. The wet season is between November and June, and includes monsoons and occasional tropical cyclones.

== Flora ==
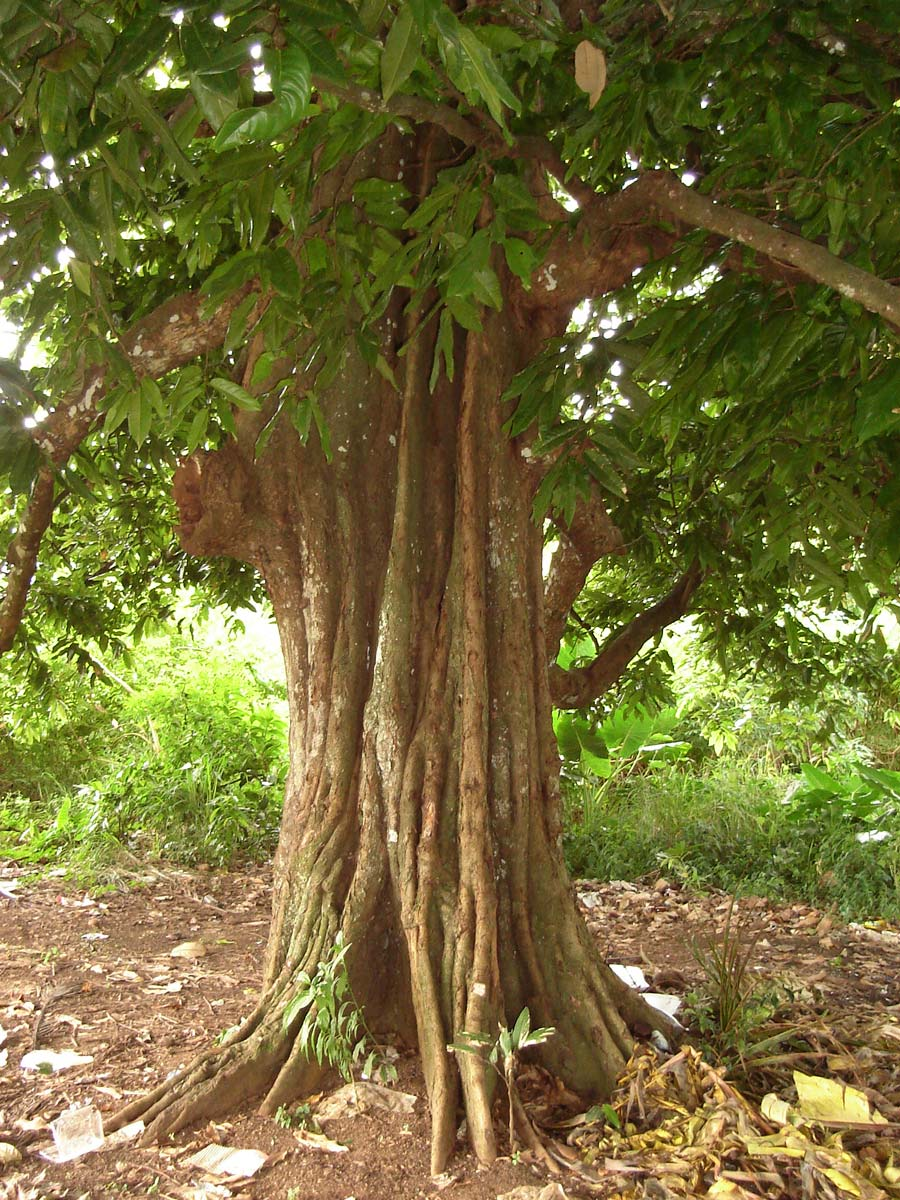
Tahitian chestnut (Inocarpus fagifer)

About 213 species of vascular plant are native to the island, with sixteen of them endemic. The rainforest on the upper slopes and central plateau consists of large evergreen trees with a canopy at 30 to 40 m (100 to 130 ft) and a scattering of emergent trees some 50 m (160 ft) high. The dominant trees are Planchonella duclitan, Syzygium nervosum, Tristiropsis acutangula, Inocarpus fagifer and Hernandia ovigera. Mid-storey species include two endemic trees, the Christmas Island palm, Arenga listeri and the screw pine Pandanus elatus. There are few shrubs, but the trunks and branches of the trees are swathed in a tangle of vines, orchids and ferns.

On terraces lower down the cliffs the trees are shorter, reaching 20 to 30 m (70 to 100 ft). Here the dominant species are Pisonia grandis, Gyrocarpus americanus, Gyrocarpus americanus, Terminalia catappa and Erythrina variegata. Various shrubs grow at the foot of the cliffs and on the coastal flats, sometimes in dense thickets. These include the endemic Pandanus christmatensis and Abutilon listeri, as well as certain shrubs and trees whose buoyant seeds are dispersed across the sea such as Scaevola taccada, Cordia subcordata, Morinda citrifolia, Hibiscus tiliaceus and Guettarda speciosa.

== Fauna ==
Christmas Island was uninhabited until the end of the nineteenth century. The island possesses no large native, terrestrial mammals and the endemic mammal fauna of the island has been largely destroyed by the introduction of exotic species such as cats, dogs and black rats (Rattus rattus). The diurnal bulldog rat (Rattus nativitatis) and the nocturnal Maclear's rat (Rattus macleari) both became extinct after the accidental introduction of the black rat. The Christmas Island shrew (Crocidura trichura) may also be extinct, and the Christmas Island pipistrelle (Pipistrellus murrayi) has not been seen since 2009. The Christmas Island flying fox (Pteropus melanotus natalis), the only other endemic mammal, is declining in numbers and is considered threatened.

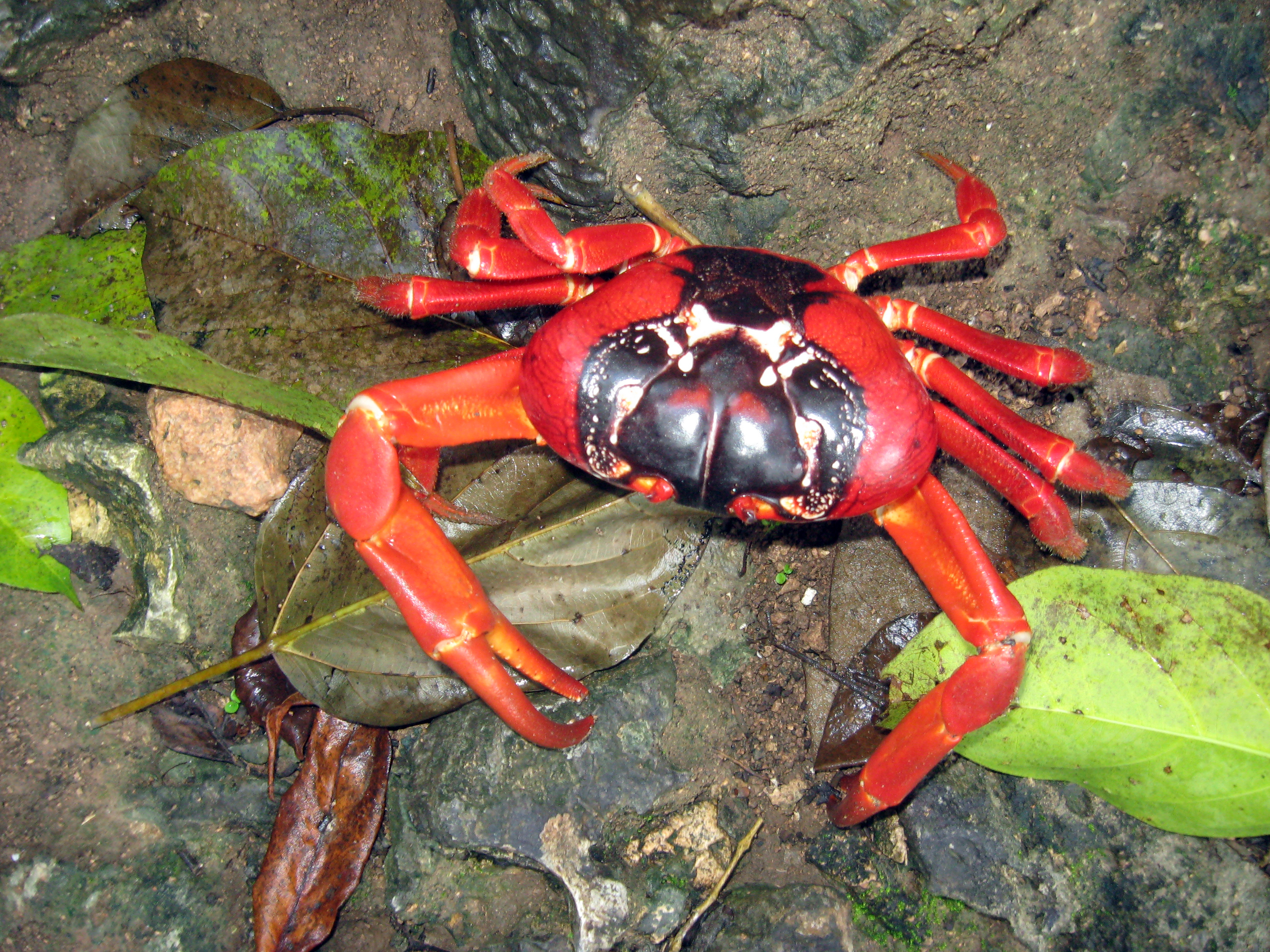
Christmas Island red crab

Rather than mammals, it is crabs that dominate the fauna. There are at least 50 species on the island, some of them endemic, 30 of them terrestrial species whose only link with the ocean is the necessity to travel to the sea to breed. Several are small and inconspicuous, but others such as the coconut crab and Christmas Island red crab are large and present in enormous numbers. In the late twentieth century there were estimated to be about 120 million red crabs on the island, and the mass migration made by the mature individuals to the coast was spectacular. The red crabs are a keystone species, feeding on the forest floor on leaves, fallen fruits, flowers, seedlings and carrion and maintaining a lawn-like turf. In the twenty-first century the number of red crabs has reduced considerably because of the accidental introduction of the yellow crazy ant to the island; this invasive species has formed supercolonies, killed crabs and had a profound impact on the biodiversity of the island.

The karst limestone areas are riddled with caves and sink-holes, some of the underground water-filled cavities being saline. These underground habitats have been imperfectly sampled, but at least twelve endemic subterranean invertebrates are known including some such as ostracods, the cave shrimp Procaris noelensis and a blind cave scorpion Hormurus polisorum, that may be relicts from the Mesozoic fauna of the Tethys Ocean. The island is fringed by coral reefs and nearly seven hundred species of marine fish have been recorded in the surrounding waters as well as three species of marine turtle and about a dozen species of whales and dolphins.

Christmas Island is recognised by BirdLife International as being an Important Bird Area, mostly because of the breeding populations of seabirds. These include the red-footed booby, which nests in colonies in bushes and trees, the brown booby, which nests on cliffs, and the endemic Abbott's booby which nests on tall, emergent trees. Another endemic bird, the Christmas frigatebird, nests on the shore terraces, and the great frigatebird nests in semi-deciduous trees nearby. The brown noddy and two species of tropicbird also nest on the island. Land birds include four endemic species, the Christmas thrush, the Christmas imperial pigeon, the Christmas white-eye and the Christmas Island hawk-owl, and several endemic sub-species. Over a hundred migrants and vagrant species of bird have been recorded on the island.
