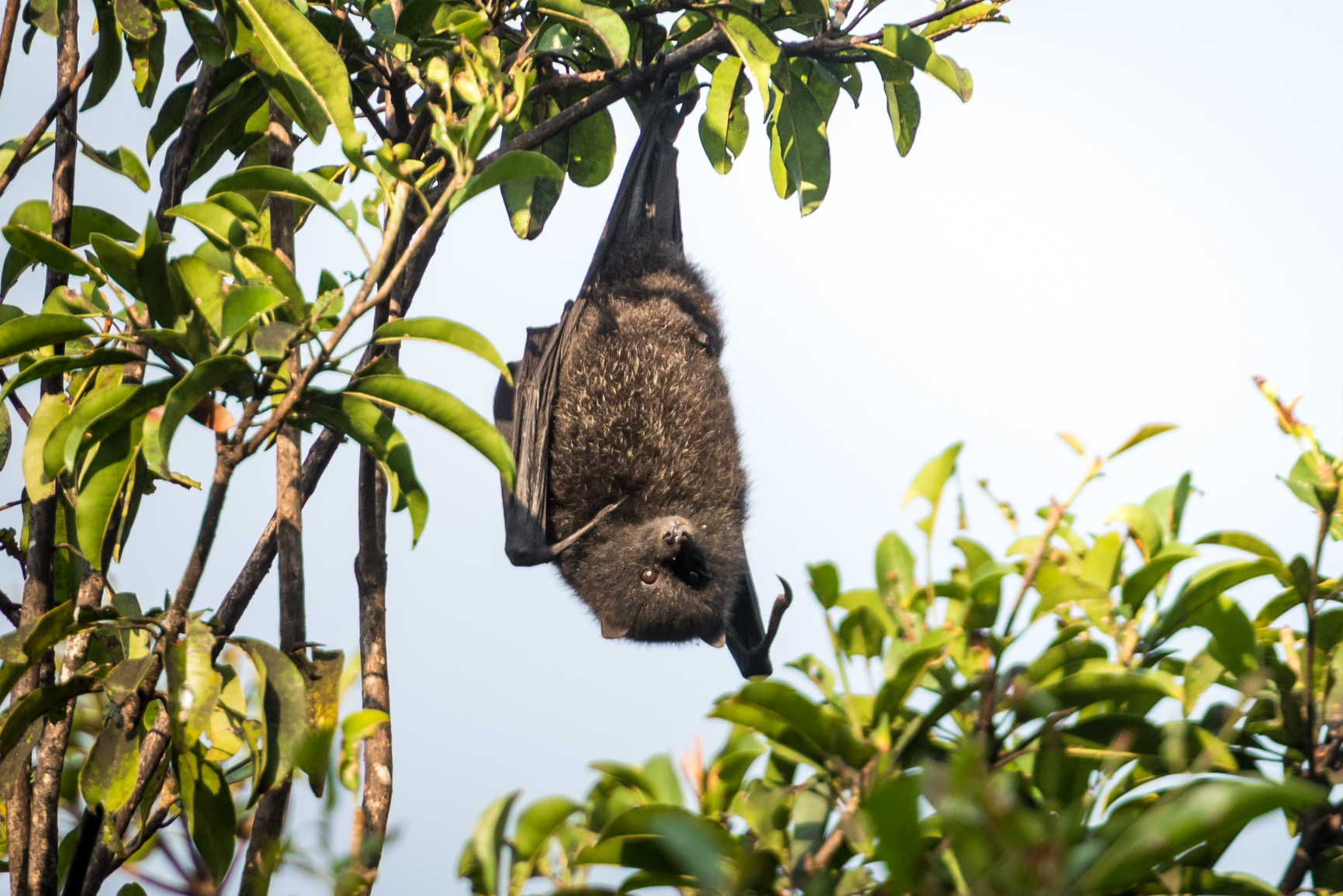

Conservation status
- Vulnerable (IUCN 3.1)

Scientific classification
- Kingdom: Animalia
- Phylum: Chordata
- Class: Mammalia
- Infraclass: Placentalia
- Order: Chiroptera
- Family: Pteropodidae
- Genus: Pteropus
- Species: P. melanotus
- Subspecies: P. m. natalis

Trinomial name
- Pteropus melanotus natalis Thomas, 1887
- Location of Christmas Island

Synonyms
- Pteropus natalis

= Christmas Island flying fox =

Species of mammal (bat)

The Christmas Island flying fox or Christmas Island fruit bat, as the name suggests, is a flying fox endemic to Christmas Island. It is unclear if it should be considered a distinct species (Pteropus natalis), or a subspecies of the black-eared flying fox (P. melanotus natalis).

The Christmas Island flying fox is medium-sized, averaging 400 g (14 oz). It has mainly black fur, but slight variations exist. It gives birth to one pup (generally during the wet season from December to March), which can fly by five or six months, and reaches sexual maturity by 27 or 28 months, which is one of the slowest maturation times of any bat. Life expectancy is thought to be 6 to 12 years. It forages across the island for fruit and nectar, and, being one of two animals on the island to do so, is likely a keystone species, important in seed dispersal and pollination. Unlike most other bats, it often starts foraging a few hours before sunset (partial diurnality).

Due to human activity, it is the sole remaining native mammal species on the island. The population has gone into sharp decline, reduced by 66–75% between 1984 and 2006, and by 35–39% from 2006 to 2012. Causes of the decline likely include development of the island, invasive species, and phosphate mining and resultant cadmium poisoning. The species is considered critically endangered, and if the population trend is maintained, Christmas Island flying foxes are likely to become extinct in the near future.

== Taxonomy ==
- - Flying foxes
    - Little red flying fox
    - - - - - Island flying fox
            - Christmas Island flying fox
          - - - Black flying fox
              - Spectacled flying fox
            - - Marianas flying fox
              - Insular flying fox
        - - - Grey-headed flying fox
            - Samoa flying fox
          - - Little golden-mantled flying fox
            - - - Ryukyu flying fox
                - - Comoro flying fox
                  - Pemba flying fox
              - - Rodrigues flying fox
                - - Indian flying fox
                  - Malaysian flying fox
                  - - Madagascan flying fox
                    - - Seychelles flying fox
                      - - Aldabra flying fox
                        - Mauritian flying fox

The relations of the Christmas Island flying fox with some other flying foxes

The Christmas Island flying fox was first described as Pteropus natalis in 1887 by British zoologist Oldfield Thomas, who sailed to Christmas Island on HMS Flying Fish, on the basis of two females and a newborn male.

In 1940, British zoologist Frederick Nutter Chasen demoted all Pteropus in the region to subspecies of the black-eared flying fox, though he expressed some doubts on the validity of P. melanotus natalis. This sentiment was shared with subsequent authors, and the Australian government,. The Christmas Island flying fox seems to maintain a fair degree of genetic diversity, and its restriction to an island could suggest sufficient genetic isolation to warrant separation. However, the authoritative Mammal Species of the World follows the subspecies classification.

Genetic mapping suggests the Christmas Island flying fox is closely related to other Oceanian flying foxes, and is part of the griseus species complex, along with the island, grey, Philippine grey, great, spectacled, black, insular, Kosrae, Admiralty, Geelvink Bay, Marianas, Pelew, Ontong Java, and Nicobar flying foxes.

The Christmas Island flying fox may descend from a population of island flying foxes from Pulau Panjang off the northeast coast of Java.

== Description ==
The Christmas Island flying fox is medium-sized, averaging about 129.5 mm (5.10 in) in forearm length, and 400 g (14 oz), up to a maximum in males of 553 g (19.5 oz), which would be achieved at an age of 38.5 months. On average, males are 3.6% heavier than females. Males reach peak body mass in May, possibly coinciding with the mating season. It has a broad snout, short and pointed ears, and short teeth (especially the canines).

It is generally covered in deep shining black fur, but the body has a slightly browner tinge than the head. The fur is thick and soft, especially on the head and neck, and grows sparser on the limbs. Some individuals have an indistinct reddish collar, giving the body a rounded appearance. In some (probably old) males, there is a brown band around the neck, most conspicuous on the sides, narrowing towards the nape without joining.

British paleontologists Charles William Andrews noted that it emits a loud, harsh screech.

== Life history ==
Illustration by British palaeontologist Charles William Andrews (1900)

=== Reproduction ===
Like other flying foxes, it is a K-selected species with a long lifespan and slow reproduction rate. Though pups can be born throughout the year, birth rates are highest from December to February (during the wet season), but especially in February. Generally only one pup is born, and given infant mortality, an individual, on average, has to breed for several years to avert sub-replacement fertility. Like most other flying foxes, gestation time is about five months, and the pup is weaned after four months. There are multiple roost sites on the island where females and their pups congregate for a portion of the year.

Since males seem to be defending mating territories with multiple females, and males are bigger than females, it is assumed to be polygynous, and males and females can mate multiple times. It is possible that males fight over females, and larger claws in males may be used in defending territories and harems. However, sexually mature males are unlikely to maintain harems until they reach full size at about 38.5 months. The average life expectancy is estimated to be 6 to 12 years, and, based on this, generation time is 5 to 9 years, though it could be as short as two years.

=== Development ===
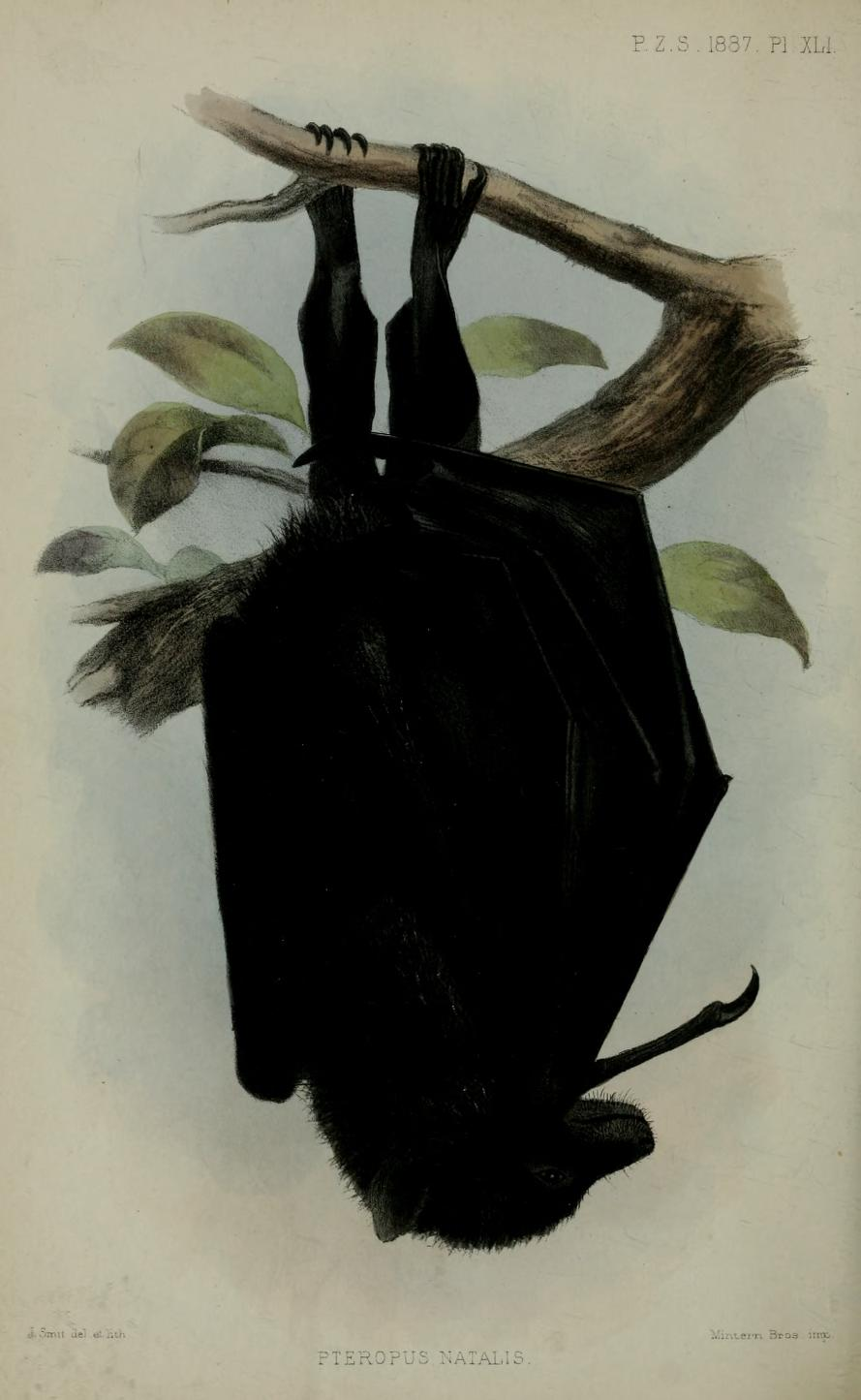
Illustration by bird illustrator John Gerrard Keulemans (1887)

A newborn has a forearm length about 49 mm (1.9 in) and weighs 55 g (1.9 oz). Its forearm length increases an estimated 0.029±0.005 mm each day, while its weight increases 0.33±0.7 g per day. This is appreciably slower than other flying foxes. The thumb does not increase much in size, only 1.2% bigger in adults than juveniles, suggesting the thumb is important in social interactions or moving in trees prior to flight-readiness. It becomes flight-ready after five or six months when it reaches an estimated forearm length of 112 mm (4.4 in) and weight of 163 g (5.7 oz), respectively 86.3% and 41.2% of their adult dimensions.

Males begin to mature at 15 months of age and are sexually mature by 27 months; females reach physical maturity at 24 months, and sexual maturity by 28 months. This is one of the oldest ages of maturation of any known bat. For example, the grey-headed flying fox reaches sexual maturity at 16 and 11 months for males and females respectively. This may be due to a lack of predators on the island and an overall low natural mortality rate, which would make it more beneficial to delay development in order to prolong lifespan. Development is mainly skeletal prior to maturation, and then focuses more on weight gain.

== Population ==
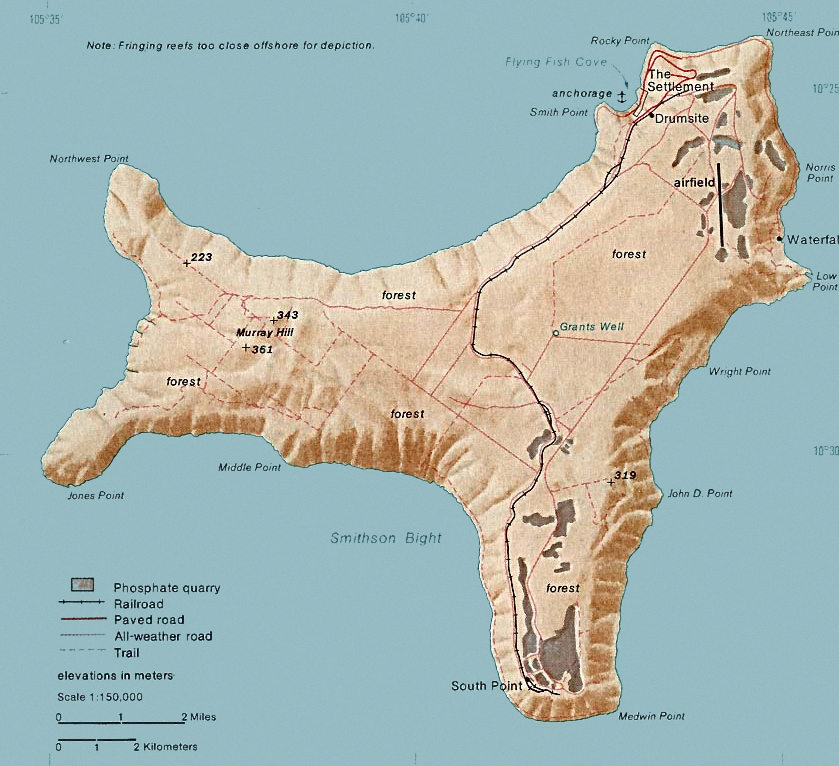
Map of Christmas Island

The Christmas Island flying fox is endemic to the 135 km^{2} (52 mi^{2}) Christmas Island, and was described by the first settlers in the 1890s as very common. British palaeontologist Charles William Andrews, on his 1897 visit to the island, reported hundreds of flying foxes covering a dead tree. In 1947, British naturalist Carl Alexander Gibson-Hill also reported the flying fox as plentiful, and described them as somewhat of a nuisance for destroying fruit crops, especially papaya.

A 1984 survey reported a population of about 6,000 individuals, and 3,500 of these roosted in six colonies along the coastline: Middle Point (assumed breeding colony), Daniel Roux Cave (assumed bachelor colony), Ethel Beach (assumed juvenile colony), Hosnies Spring (assumed breeding colony with a population of ~2,000), Greta Beach (assumed breeding and juvenile colony), and McMicken Point. Colonies may hug the coastline due to the greater amount of food resources there. It seasonally aggregates to certain roosts, possibly related to mating behavior, and most roosts may be seasonally occupied.

The remaining 2,500 individuals were scattered across the island, roosting either solitarily or in small groups of three or four individuals, and moved freely about the island rather than remaining sedentary. The Christmas Island flying fox has been observed roosting in 13 different tree species: the powder-puff tree, the black mangrove, the stinkwood Celtis timorensis, the Malayan banyan, the sea randa, the helicopter tree, the sea hibiscus, the guest tree, the dogbane Ochrosia ackeringae, the parasol leaf tree, the grand devil's-claws, Syzygium nervosum, and the beach almond. Roosts tend to be in the wind-exposed canopy to aid in take-off.

The population drastically declined by 2006; the reported population of 1,500–2,000 represented a 66–75% decline. The former three of the six colonies (Middle Point, Daniel Roux Cave and Ethel beach) seem to have been abandoned, and the remaining housed no more than 500–1,400 individuals. Anecdotal evidence suggests decline during the mid-1990s, possibly starting in 1988. Population continued to decline by 35–39% between 2006 and 2012, indicating the cause of decline has not been adequately dealt with yet. Colonies of flying-foxes have since been found to be roosting colonially in different places and near the abandoned colonies.

== Ecology ==
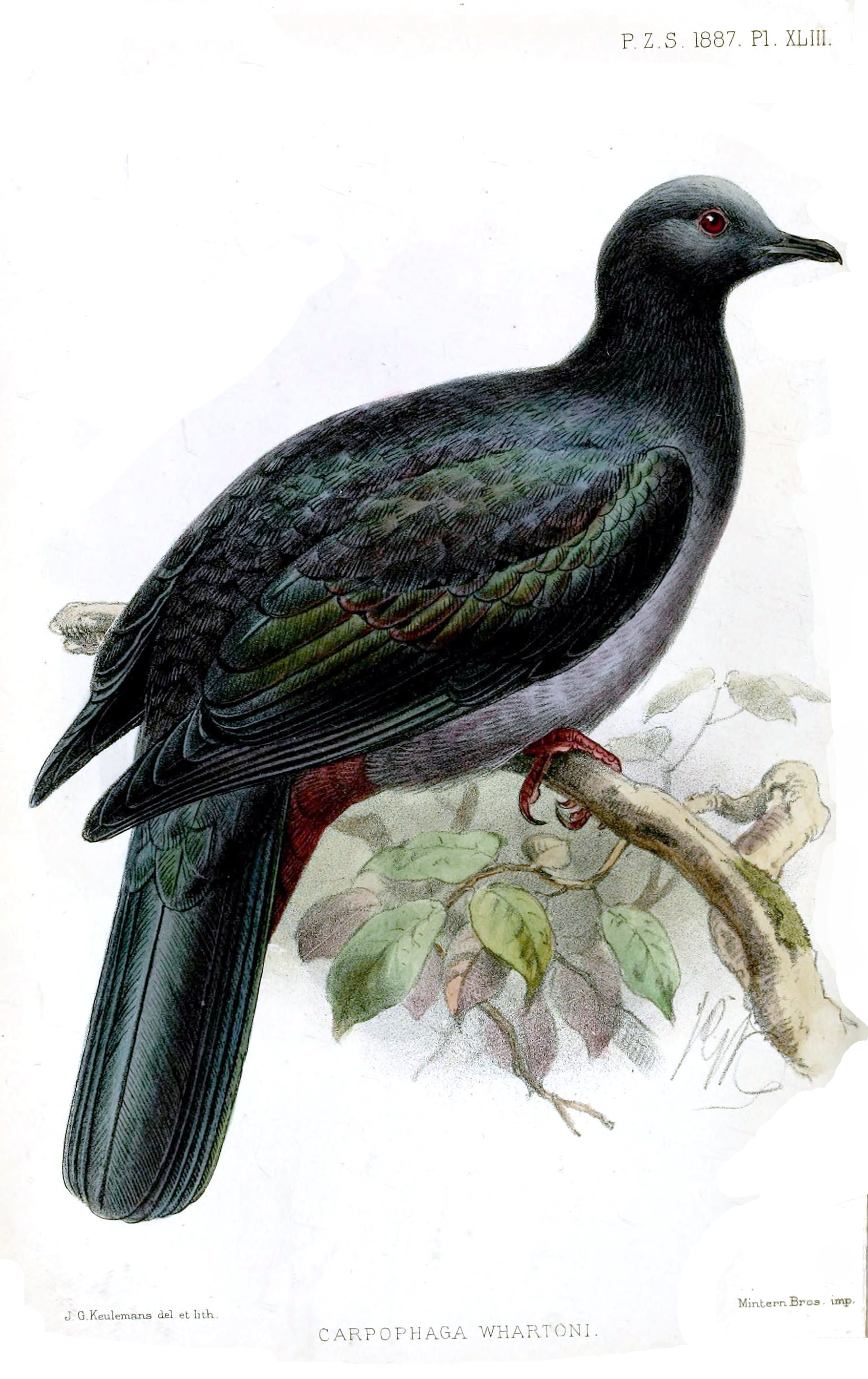
Illustration of the Christmas imperial pigeon by Dutch ornithologist Johannes Gerardus Keulemans (1887)

Unlike most other bats, the Christmas Island flying fox starts foraging a few hours before sunset (partial diurnality), and has been observed to leave roosts as early as 1:00 p.m. local time, though uncommonly before 4:00 p.m., and peak time between 5:45 and 6:15 p.m. It has been hypothesised that this behaviour could be facilitated by the lack of natural predators.

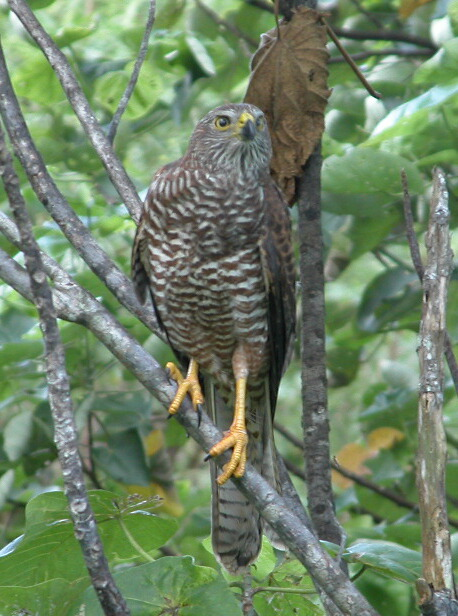
The Christmas Island goshawk

Individuals forage across the island. It primarily feeds on fruit (frugivory) and nectar (nectarivory), sourced from 35 native plants and 18 introduced, which increase productivity in the wet season from December to March. Inferred from their commonness on the island, the most important trees to their diet are the powder-puff tree, C. timorensis, ivory mahogany, common fig, Polynesian chestnut, the parasol leaf tree, cockspur thorn, Planchonella duclitan, S. nervosum, beach almond, and Tristiropsis acutangula. The introduced Muntingia calabura is also noted as a major component of its diet.

The Christmas Island flying fox and the Christmas imperial pigeon are the only major frugivores on the island. Island-dwelling flying foxes, in general, may be the only animals on their island responsible for pollination and seed dispersal for local plants, acting as keystone species.

The Christmas Island goshawk has been seen attacking and eating the Christmas Island flying fox. The nankeen kestrel, which established itself on the island around 1950, and the island's frigatebirds have been observed harassing it. Flying foxes are generally infested with spinturnicid mites, and the mite Meristaspis calcaratus was recorded on the Christmas Island flying fox, though in low density. There is a report of a nonpathogenic coccidia protozoan infection, which is only recorded in 15 other bat species, and an unidentified ascaridid roundworm, possibly the deadly Toxocara pteropidis.

== Interactions with humans ==
Since the initial settlement of Christmas Island in the 1890s, the fragile island ecology has been disrupted, with the extinction of every other native mammal: the Christmas Island pipistrelle, Maclear's rat, bulldog rat, and Christmas Island shrew. The Christmas Island flying fox was historically hunted, made easier by island tameness, but hunting was largely minimal and products (such as bushmeat and oil) only sold locally, and the practice has since become illegal. Jackfruit was wired to trees close to the ground and used as bait.

=== Threats ===
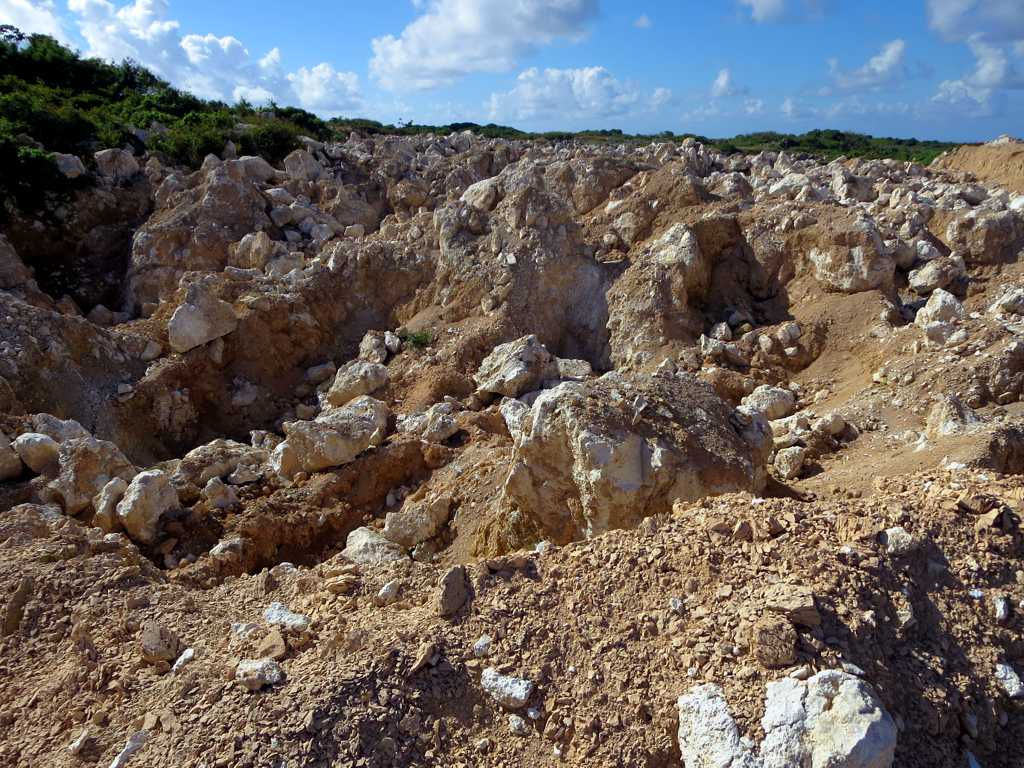
Phosphate quarry on Christmas Island

Though 63% of the island is a nature reserve, development could still harm flying fox populations. For example, the construction of a casino and possible losses to specific food resources is implicated in the abandonment of the Ethel Beach colony.

Several invasive species have been introduced to Christmas Island, including the barking gecko, Oriental wolf snake, African giant snail, black rat, feral cat, yellow crazy ants, Tanzanian blue ringleg centipede. The last three are especially implicated in harming flying foxes. However, though feral cats are known to consume the flying fox, there is no evidence they are actively hunting native wildlife; the yellow crazy ant, which sprays noxious formic acid, has formed destructive supercolonies, but while behaviour such as scratching increase in response to the presence of the ant, the flying-foxes do not relocate to different trees or different sites, indicating either minimal disturbance or maladaptive tolerance due to island tameness. Nonetheless, these invasive species have the potential to negatively impact the ecosystem via habitat alteration, outcompetition, over-predation, or acting as disease vectors. Ant supercolonies have been aerially bombed with the toxic insecticide Fipronil (but it has unknown effects on the flying fox)

Strong gale-force winds sweeping the island on 27 March 1988 coincided with the estimated start of population decline around 1988, and it was proposed that this destroyed colonies overnight and swept some bats off to sea.

Phosphate mining sends dust into the vicinity, which may contain traces of cadmium and suppress plant growth. Ingestion of sufficient quantity, possibly through licking off the dust while grooming or consuming dust-covered food, can lead to cadmium poisoning and liver problems. One roost near a phosphate drier was abandoned, and one Christmas Island flying fox liver was found to contain 0.69 mg/kg cadmium, which is higher than the 0.06–0.48 mg observed in various lab and wild animals, but lower than the toxic threshold, though even trace amounts can be harmful. The Daniel Roux Cave colony was likely abandoned due to phosphate mining activity.

=== Conservation ===
The Christmas Island flying fox population is listed as Vulnerable by the International Union for Conservation of Nature, but would be considered Critically Endangered if it is found to be a unique species (IUCN) Red List of Threatened Species as of 2008. It is considered critically endangered and protected by Australia's Environment Protection and Biodiversity Conservation Act 1999. and hunting was made illegal by the Christmas Island Act of 1958.

Whatever the case, if this rate continues, the flying fox has a 41 percent probability to go extinct in the near future by 2038. As of 2015, the management plan for the flying fox is a A$500,000 (~US$342,000) project eradicating cats, rats, and ants on the island.
