= Hosnies Spring =

Christmas Island wetland

Coordinates: 10°28′40″S 105°41′30″E

Designations

Ramsar Wetland
- Official name: Hosnie's Spring
- Designated: 11 December 1990
- Reference no.: 512

Hosnies Spring, formerly Hosnie's Spring or Hosnies Springs, is a wetland on Christmas Island, an Australian external territory in the eastern Indian Ocean. It has been recognised as being of international importance by designation under the Ramsar Convention on Wetlands.

== History ==
Hosnies Spring was known earlier but the unique ecosystem was noted in late 1980s. It was incorporated into the Christmas Island National Park in 1989, and listed on 11 December 1990 as Ramsar site 512, one of two such sites on the island. Justification for its Ramsar designation is because it:

- is an example of a type of highly unusual wetland unique to Christmas Island;
- supports a unique assemblage of flora locally restricted to the one location, and additionally several endemic and vulnerable species;
- is of special value for locally restricted species as well as several endemics.

It was initially only 0.33 hectares (0.82 acres) in area, but was expanded in 2010 to 202 hectares (500 acres) to better protect the mangrove stand, and now includes coral reefs and rocky shores.

== Description ==
The small 3,300-square-metre (36,000 sq ft) site comprises permanent freshwater streams and seepages emerging from the base of an inland cliff 200 metres (660 ft) inland which converge to form the wetland over gravel and soil with a high concentration of phosphorus on an uplifted marine terrace approximately 24–37 metres (79–121 ft) above sea level, averaging about 30 metres (98 ft), and 120 metres (390 ft) inland from the seaward cliff.

== Flora and fauna ==
The springs form a wetland supporting a unique stand of the mangroves Bruguiera gymnorhiza and Bruguiera sexangula that has probably existed at this spot for 120,000 years. The stand contains between 300 and 600 trees, including some of the largest Bruguiera ever recorded, several with trunks with diameters of more than 30 centimetres (12 in) and with a canopy 30–40 metres (98–131 ft) high. The grove lies on an inclined surface, with height varying by 13 metres (43 ft). It is composed of a few gigantic trees among many saplings.

Several species of birds and crabs endemic to the island reside on the site. Christmas Island red crabs live only on Christmas Island and the Cocos (Keeling) Islands; their numbers were estimated at 120 million in the 1980s and '90s, 40 million in 2001, but the accidental infestation of yellow crazy ants may have reduced that figure by a third. There are also robber and red (Cardisoma hirtipes) crabs.

Bird species include the Christmas Island imperial pigeon, Christmas Island emerald dove, Christmas Island goshawk, Christmas Island hawk owl and Christmas Island white-eye.
