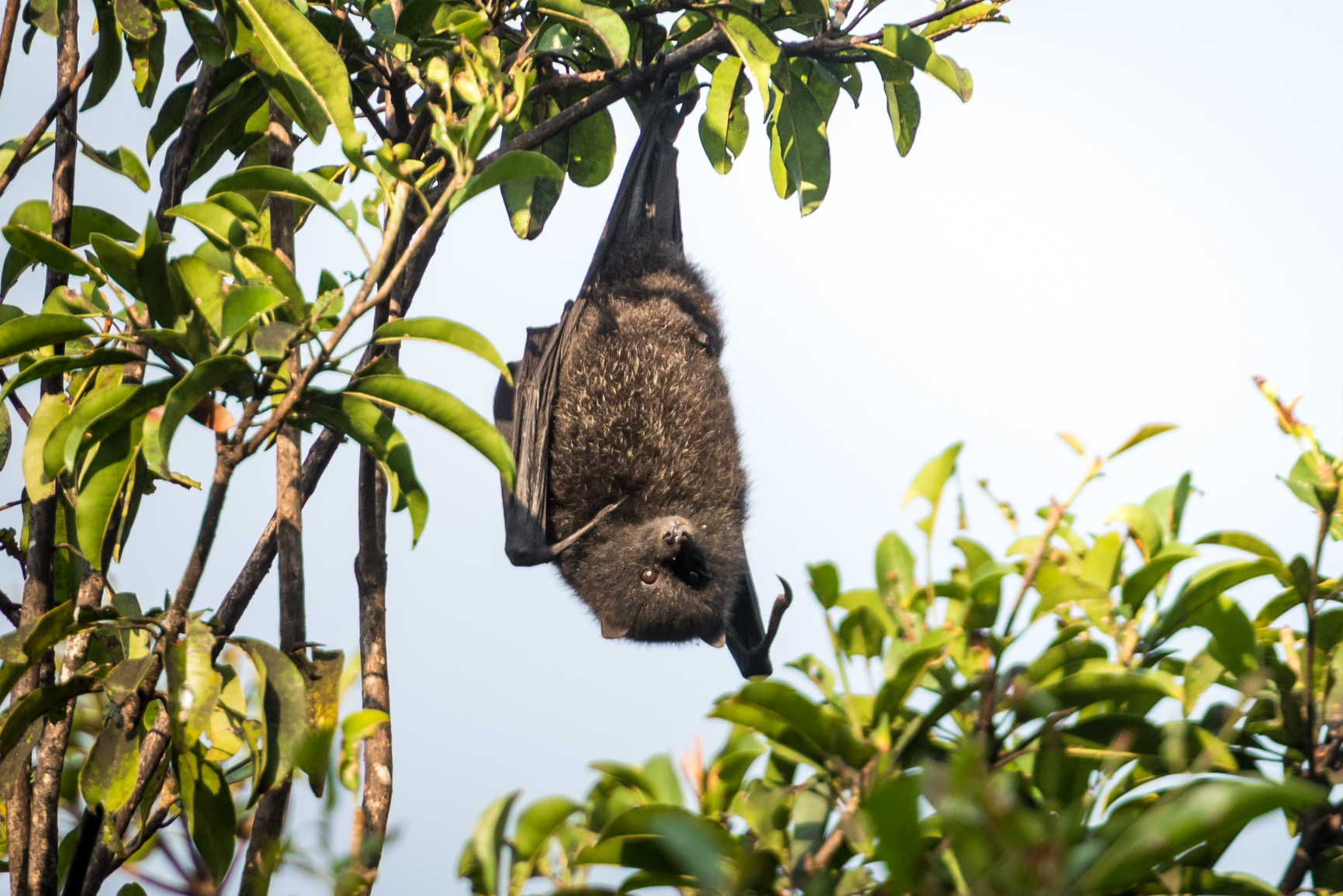

Conservation status
- Vulnerable (IUCN 3.1)

Scientific classification
- Kingdom: Animalia
- Phylum: Chordata
- Class: Mammalia
- Order: Chiroptera
- Family: Pteropodidae
- Genus: Pteropus
- Species: P. melanotus

Binomial name
- Pteropus melanotus Blyth, 1863
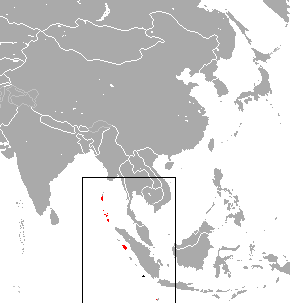
- Black-eared flying fox range: extant extinct

Synonyms
- Pteropus edulis Pteropus modiglianii Pteropus niadicus Pteropus nicobaricus Pteropus tytleri

= Black-eared flying fox =

Species of bat

The black-eared flying fox, species Pteropus melanotus, is a bat of the family Pteropodidae (megabats). Also known as Blyth's flying fox, it is found on the Andaman Islands and Nicobar Islands (India), and in Sumatra (Indonesia). A population on Christmas Island, which is critically endangered, has been placed as a subspecies of this population, although it may be a distinct species. Pteropus natalis.

== Distribution and habitat ==
The black-eared flying fox is native to various island groups in the Indo-Pacific. These include the Andaman Islands, the Nicobar Islands, the Mentawai Islands. It mostly roosts in large colonies in forests near the coast, especially in mangrove areas.

== Biology ==
The black-eared flying fox is more diurnal than most bats, emerging from its roosts before dusk and feeding on the fruits and flowers of at least twenty-six species of forest trees at least ten of which are introduced species. A single young is born annually.

== Status ==
The black-eared flying fox faces a number of threats. Destruction of its forest habitat reduces the availability of roosting sites and the animal is hunted by man for food. The crushed bones of this species are used in traditional medicine to relieve asthma symptoms. However, it has proved adaptable to changes in diet and now feeds on a number of introduced species of plant. The IUCN has rated this species as "Vulnerable".
