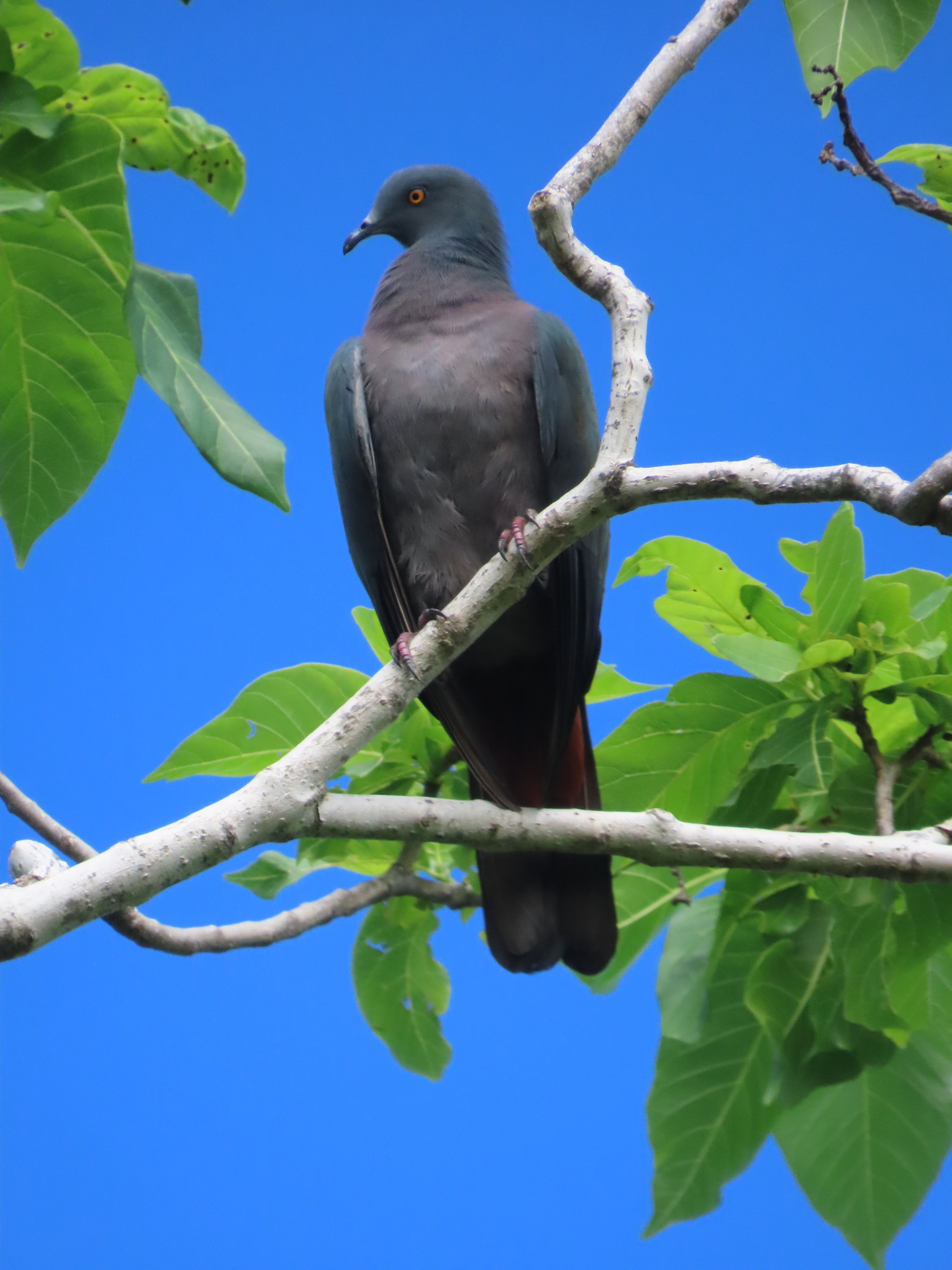
- 2026 live specimen on the northeast tip of Christmas Island

Conservation status
- Least Concern (IUCN 3.1)

Scientific classification
- Kingdom: Animalia
- Phylum: Chordata
- Class: Aves
- Order: Columbiformes
- Family: Columbidae
- Genus: Ducula
- Species: D. whartoni

Binomial name
- Ducula whartoni (Sharpe, 1887)

Synonyms
- Carpophaga whartoni Sharpe, 1887; Ducula rosacea whartoni Chasen, 1933

= Christmas imperial pigeon =

Species of bird

The Christmas imperial pigeon or Christmas Island imperial pigeon (Ducula whartoni), also known as Black imperial pigeon, Dusky imperial pigeon, Wharton's imperial pigeon, or burong pergam, is a large imperial pigeon endemic to Christmas Island in the northeastern Indian Ocean. It has an overall grey-blue colouration, and juveniles are duller than adults. It makes a soft purring coo sound and a deeper whoo sound comparable to a cow mooing. It lays one glossy white egg per brood, and is possibly somewhat colonial.

Other than the Christmas Island flying fox, the Christmas imperial pigeon is the only fruit-eating (frugivorous) animal on the island, and the pigeon feeds and nests in the dense canopy. It mainly inhabits the tropical inland plateau, and widespread non-native Jamaican cherry forests. It was previously thought to be in danger of extinction due to habitat loss and invasive species (specifically the yellow crazy ant), but it is now considered to be rather common, with a breeding population of about 5,000.

== Taxonomy ==
The Christmas imperial pigeon was first described by English ornithologist Richard Bowdler Sharpe in 1887 based on an adult male specimen collected by Captain John Maclear of HMS Challenger. The species name whartoni honours British admiral Sir William Wharton. It is unclear how Sharpe and Wharton are affiliated, but Wharton was made a Fellow of the Royal Society in the previous year, possibly somehow affecting Sharpe's thinking. Sharpe first classified it into the now-defunct genus Carpophaga. In 1933, English zoologist Frederick Nutter Chasen considered the Christmas imperial pigeon to be a subspecies of pink-headed imperial pigeon as D. rosacea whartoni. In 1937, American ornithologist James L. Peters synonymised Carpophaga with Drucula, and disagreed with Chasen, classifying the Christmas imperial pigeon as a distinct species, D. whartoni.

The Christmas imperial pigeon is a species of imperial pigeon (Ducula), which is widely spread out across Oceania, however it is the only imperial pigeon in the Indian Ocean. Likewise, its affinities are unclear. However, the Christmas imperial pigeon could be placed into the D. aenea species complex along with the green (nominate), island, grey, and pink-headed imperial pigeons. The latter is sometimes considered synonymous with the Christmas imperial pigeon.

== Description ==
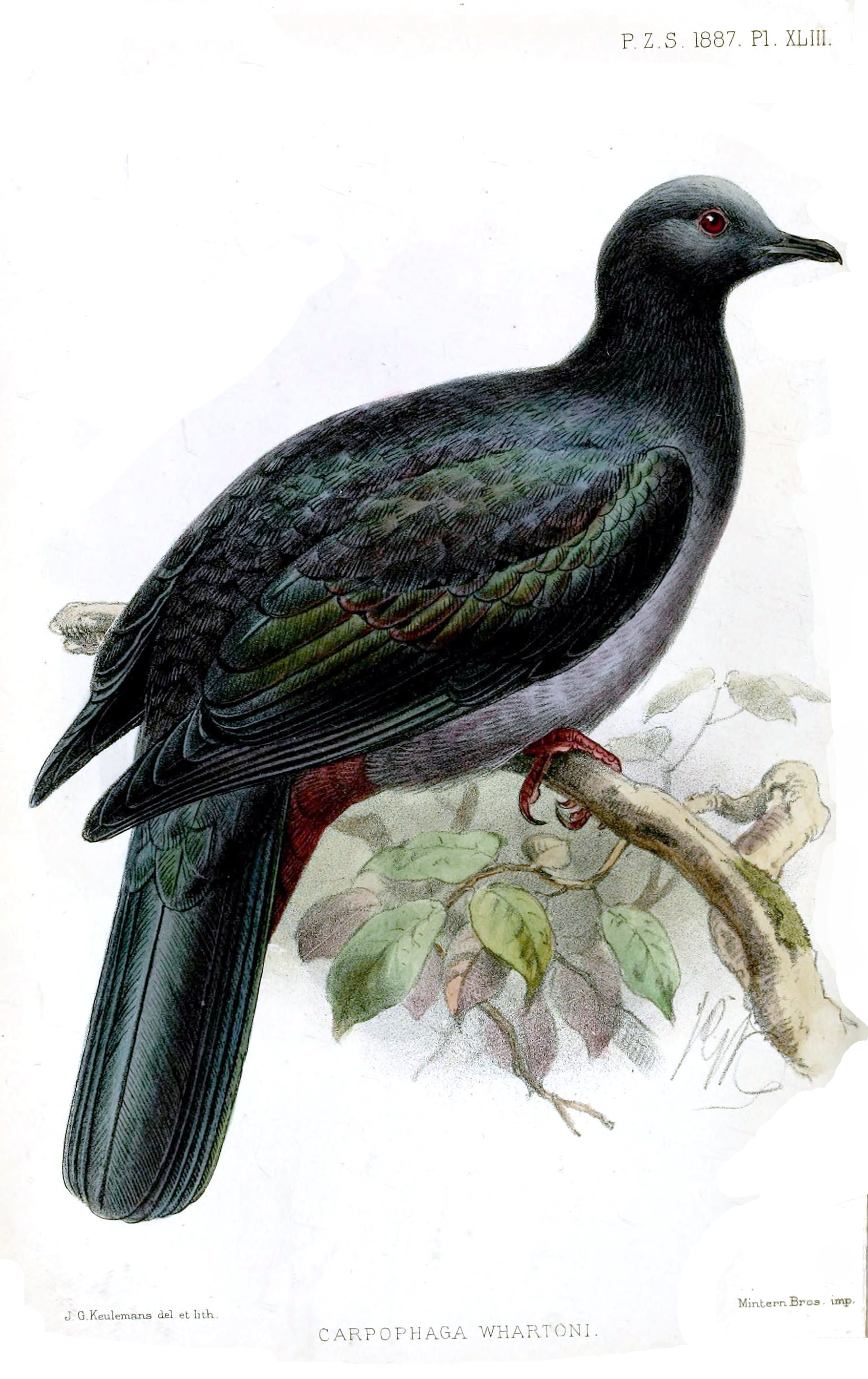
1887 illustration by Dutch bird illustrator John Gerrard Keulemans

An adult Christmas imperial pigeon male measures on average 435–470 mm (17.1–18.5 in), and females 440–460 mm (17–18 in). In males, the wing averages 250–264 mm (9.8–10.4 in), and in females 231–258 mm (9.1–10.2 in). The average male weighs 383–700 g (0.84–1.54 lb), and female 406–575 g (0.90–1.27 lb). It is rather large for imperial pigeons, though relatively lightly built.

It has an overall grey-black colour, with darker feathers on the top portion, and lighter feathers on the breast and belly with a burgundy tinge. The beak is black. There is a narrow white band on the base of the upper beak. The eye colour ranges from yellow to orange. The nape and back have a glossy oil-green colour. The wings have glossy bluish-green tips, and are greyish-brown nearer the base. The tail has broad, greenish-brown tips with a somewhat scalloped appearance, and the legs and underside of the tail have reddish-brown feathers. The feet are purple-red.

Juveniles look similar to adults, but have a duller colouration without the oil-green gloss from the lower back to the tail coverts, with a brown breast and belly, a dull grey crown, and grey-brown feet. Eye colour is dark brown.

The Christmas imperial pigeon is known to make a soft gurgling or purring coo sound. It can also make a deep whoo or croo-croo-croo sound which has also been compared to a cow mooing in the distance. It sometimes makes loud clapping sounds with its wings, but in flight, it is largely quiet.

== Breeding ==
Males have been observed to engage in a courtship display, a "perch coo". A male will slightly puff up its chest, press his bill against it, hold his wings close, and will emit a loud coo before lowering his body to an almost horizontal position. It will rhythmically repeat this motion.

The Christmas imperial pigeon generally constructs nests in the dense forest canopy. One nest was observed to have been 200 mm (7.9 in) in diameter, 60 mm (2.4 in) thick, and constructed using only dead twigs 8 m (26 ft) off the ground in a non-native white leadtree. Peak breeding season may be from November to April. Breeding season is from at least August to April, though predominantly November to March, and the pigeon may be somewhat colonial. It lays a single egg per brood—on rare occasions two—and may lay two broods per year.

One observed chick, probably 10–13 days old, was measured to be 200 mm (7.9 in) long, with developing covert and secondary feathers, and emerging primary feathers. By age 22 days, the chick resembled a small adult, except with remnants of down feathers on the breast and belly, brown feet and irises, and duller plumage. It fledged (became capable of flight) upon reaching 70% of full size at age 24–27 days, and remained dependent on parental care for 17 more days. The chick was fed over a period of 5 to 15 minutes. The chick prodded its parent's throat, and then inserted its beak for about 12 seconds, and did this twice per minutes. Feeding was observed between 9–10 A.M., but probably occurred again in the evening or nighttime. Outside of feeding, it was left alone in the nest, but may have been accompanied through the night.

An egg taken in 1914 was observed to be a broad-elliptical shape, white, slightly glossy, and measured 41.1 mm × 29.8 mm (1.62 in × 1.17 in).

== Habitat and distribution ==
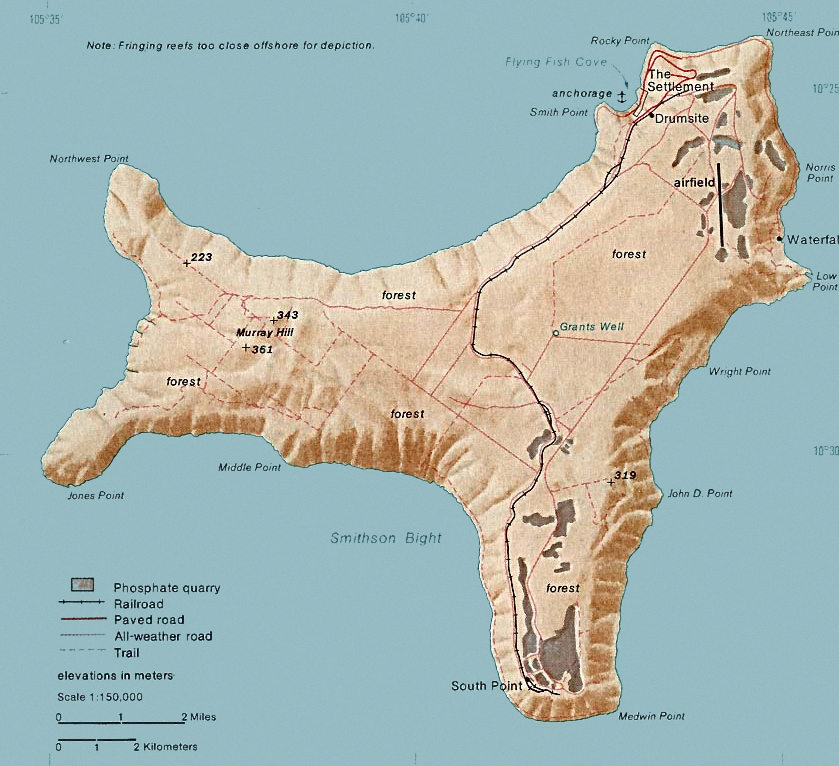
Map of Christmas Island

The species is endemic to the tropical 135 km^{2} (52 mi^{2}) Christmas Island in the eastern Indian Ocean. It predominantly inhabits the evergreen inland plateau, but is found throughout the island. Though about a third of this was cut down for phosphate mining, introduced Jamaican cherry trees have recolonized many areas.

The Christmas imperial pigeon was introduced to the Coco Islands (probably Horsburgh Island) sometime between November 1888 and August 1890, with the last sighting made in 1906.

== Ecology ==
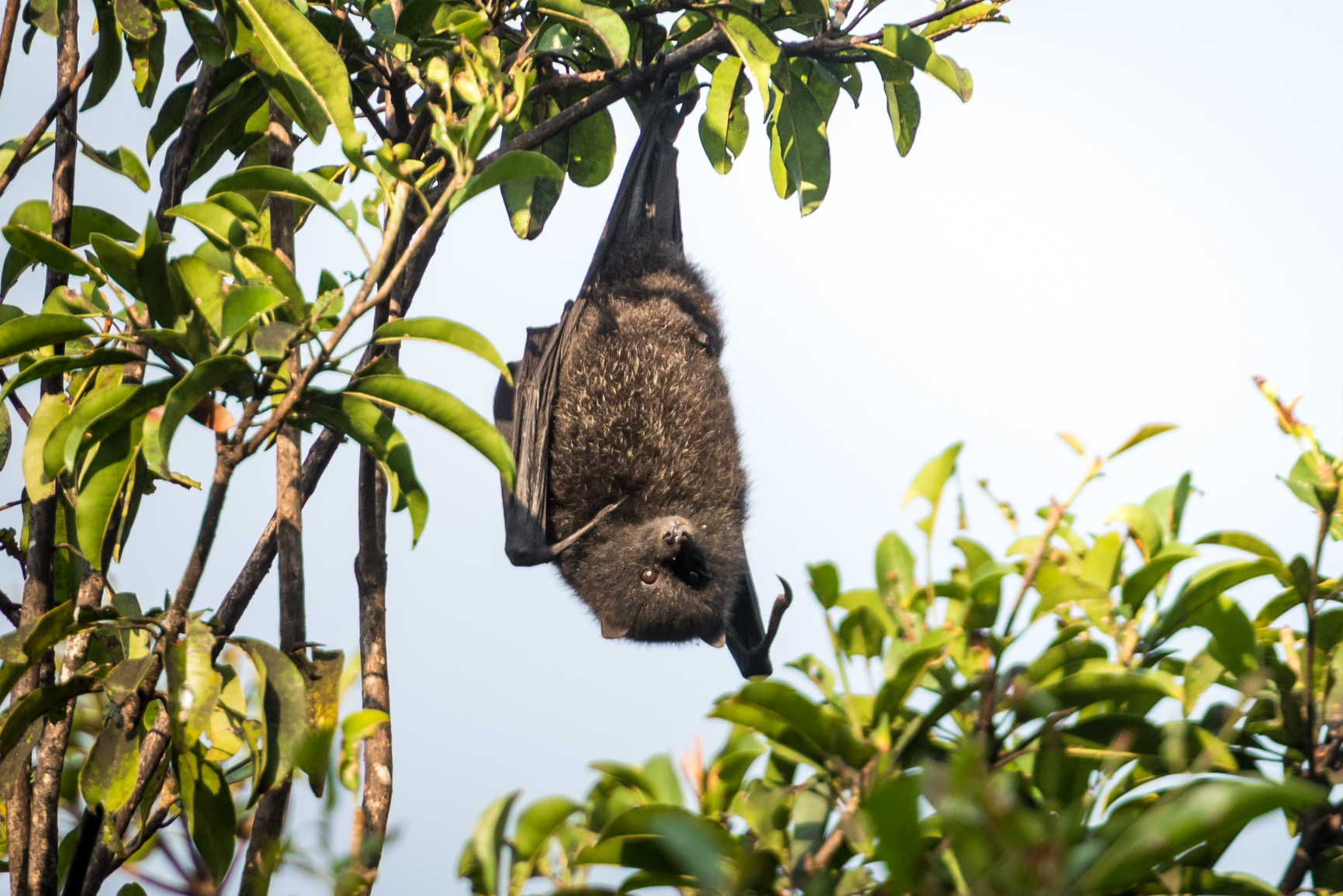
The Christmas Island flying fox is the only other major frugivore on the island.

The Christmas imperial pigeon, along with the Christmas Island flying fox, are the only 2 major fruit-eating (frugivorous) animals on the island. As such, the pigeon plays an important role in seed dispersal, seeds swallowed whole and remaining intact (imperial pigeons are able to stretch the base of the jaw to eat larger food items.) They have been reported feeding on smaller seeded plants such as the stinkwood Celtis timorensis, the common fig, the chinaberry tree, Syzygium nervosum, Tristiropsis acutangula, and the introduced Jamaican cherry. The latter has become a very important food source, with sightings of several hundreds of pigeons where the plant is common.

It generally feeds in flocks in the canopy, isolated trees, or shrubs, and descends to drink from springs or puddles. It has also been observed feeding singly or in pairs. Though frugivorous, the pigeon has been observed repeatedly consuming the leaves of the introduced papaya plant (folivory), which may have been caused by an island-wide shortage of fruit or, less likely, for some therapeutic reason. Peak foraging time appears to be just before dusk.

The Christmas goshawk has been observed preying on a Christmas imperial pigeon chick.

== Conservation ==
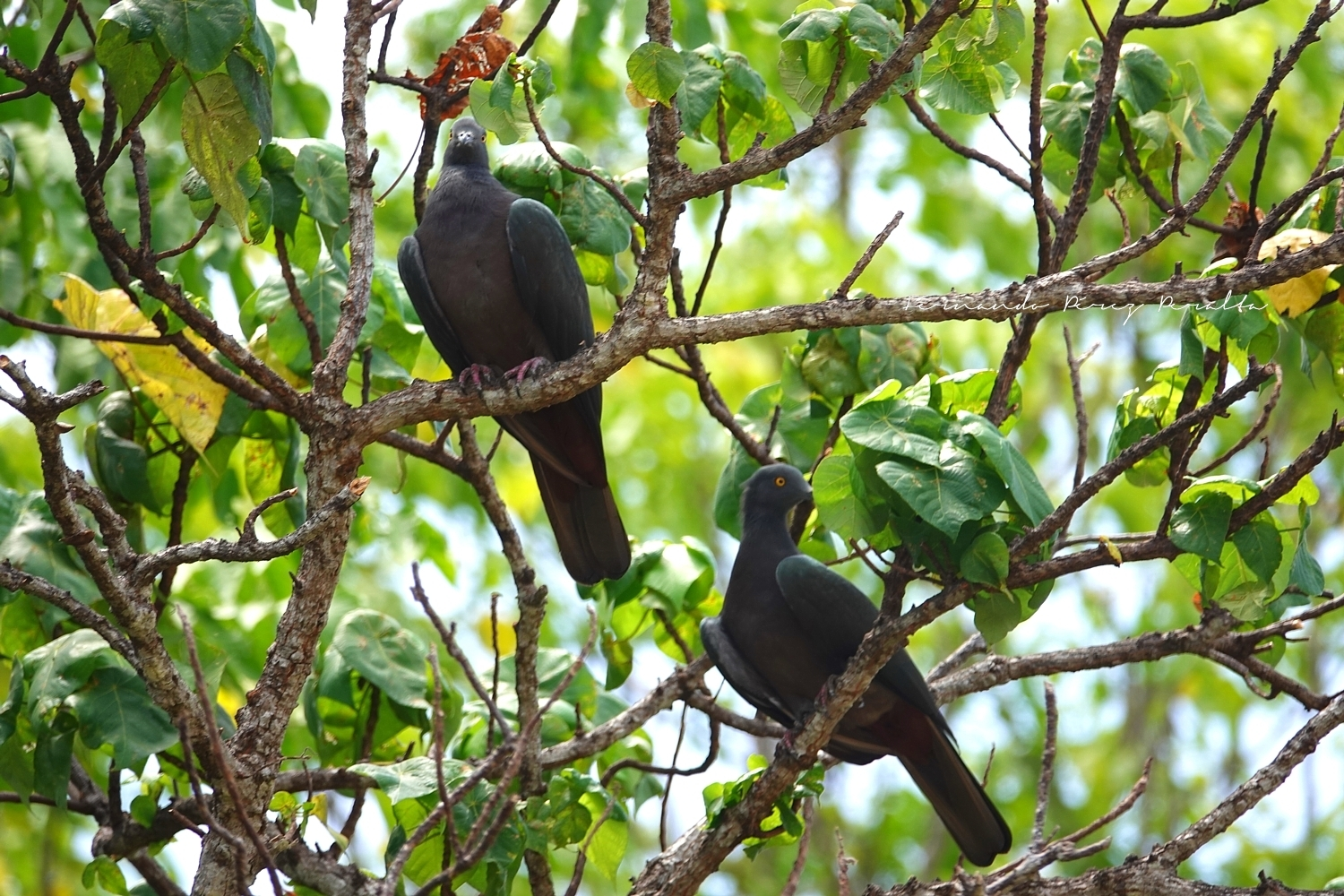
Two live specimens

The Christmas imperial pigeon is classified as least concern by the IUCN Red List of Threatened Species and is not protected by the Australian Environment Protection and Biodiversity Conservation Act 1999 because, though its moderately small population is restricted to an island, it appears to be stable with no indication of significant future decline. It is possible that the population fluctuated from the initial settlement of the island in 1888 to the 1970s, with reports of a minor decline. In 1975, ornithologist Gerard Frederick van Tets guessed the total population to be 20 to 200 birds. A 2000 survey estimated the breeding population to be 1,000, and predicted that, due to the rapid spread of the invasive yellow crazy ant, there would be an 80% decline in the pigeon's population over the next 12 years, making it critically endangered. Conversely, a 2003 survey estimated 35,000–66,000 individuals. The International Union for Conservation of Nature (IUCN) lists the population as 5,000 mature individuals, and the pigeon is considered to be common with no major concerns of decline.

=== Threats ===
Hunting was, historically, the main threat to the Christmas imperial pigeon, and the seeding of Japanese cherry trees along roadsides made it easier game, but the practice was made illegal in 1977.

A 1994 survey found the diet of feral cats consisted predominantly of Christmas imperial pigeon, Christmas Island flying fox, and invasive rats. However, these were more likely scavenged than hunted.

Though there is no quantitative evidence, there are anecdotal reports of yellow crazy ants attacking birds or disturbing nests. Infestations of scale insects, caused by their mutualistic relationship with the ants, has negatively impacted the canopy, and, in the long-term, could lead to decline of the habitat's health. The reduction of the Christmas Island red crab population due to the ants has led to the germination of plants which otherwise would have been eaten by the crabs, which could eventually dramatically alter forest structure.

The yellow crazy ant population is controlled by placing bait laced with the insecticide Fipronil. Surveys from spring 2002 and fall 2003 indicate a reduction in imperial pigeon populations in baited areas, though this may simply be due to seasonal differences in habitation. Nonetheless, ingestion of Fipronil is known to affect feeding behaviour, reproduction, and egg viability in other birds in the long term.

== See also ==
- Birds of Christmas Island
