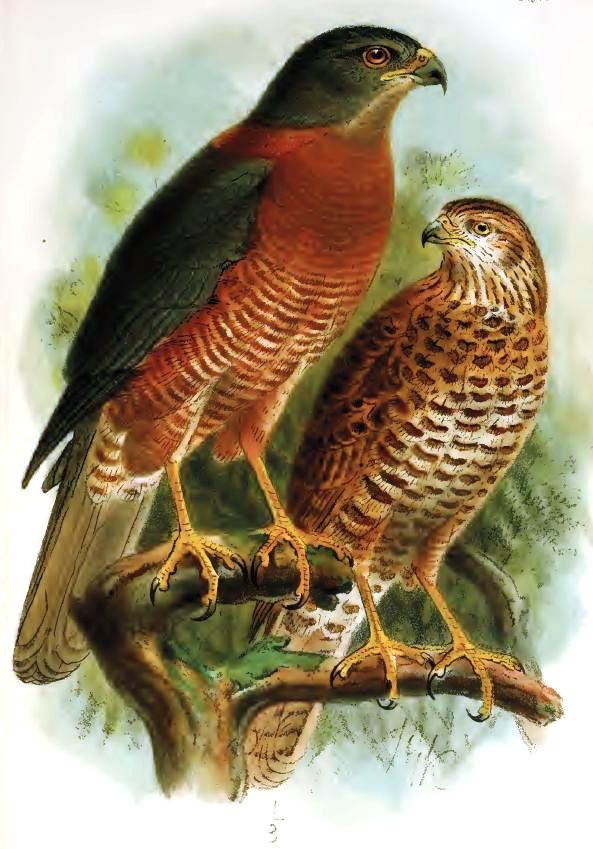

Conservation status
- Endangered (EPBC Act)

Scientific classification
- Kingdom: Animalia
- Phylum: Chordata
- Class: Aves
- Order: Accipitriformes
- Family: Accipitridae
- Genus: Tachyspiza
- Species: T. fasciata
- Subspecies: T. f. natalis

Trinomial name
- Tachyspiza fasciata natalis (Lister, 1889)

Synonyms
- Accipiter natalis; Accipiter novaehollandiae natalis; Accipiter hiogaster natalis; Accipiter fasciatus natalis

= Christmas goshawk =

Subspecies of bird

The Christmas goshawk (Tachyspiza fasciata natalis) or Christmas Island goshawk is a bird of prey in the goshawk and sparrowhawk family Accipitridae. It is a threatened endemic of Christmas Island, an Australian territory in the eastern Indian Ocean.

== Taxonomy ==
The taxon was described in 1889 by Lister as a full species, Accipiter natalis. Since then there has been debate as to whether its affinities lie with the brown goshawk or the grey goshawk (A. novaehollandiae). In the 2004 national recovery plan for the taxon it is treated as a subspecies of the brown goshawk, though the possibility has been raised of elevating it to the species level again. Christidis and Boles (2008) treat it as a subspecies of the variable goshawk (A. hiogaster). Here it is treated as a subspecies of the brown goshawk pending further study of its genome.

== Description ==
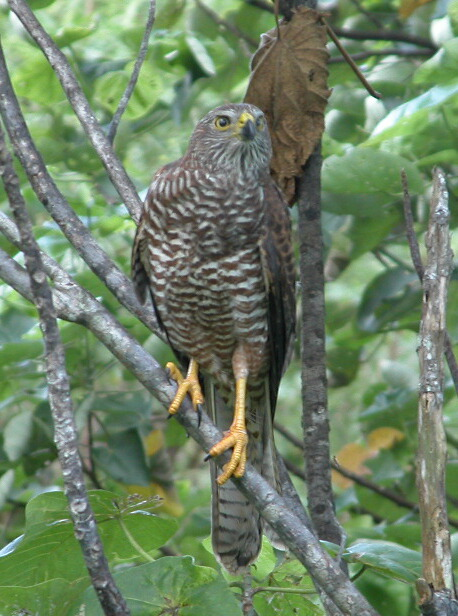
Christmas goshawk

The Christmas goshawk is smaller and has more rounded wings than the nominate subspecies. Colouration is broadly similar, differing in that the hindneck, cap and ear coverts are dark grey, lacking a brown tinge. Females are distinctly larger than males.

== Distribution and habitat ==
The goshawk is restricted to the 135 km^{2} Christmas Island where it is found in the tropical rainforest that covers 75% of the island, as well as in other habitats there such as regrowth forest and the edges of clearings.

== Behaviour ==
=== Feeding ===
The goshawk feeds on a wide range of vertebrates and invertebrates, including birds, mammals, reptiles and insects. It takes its prey from the ground or in flight. It will hunt from a perch or chase birds through the forest. It is known to hunt native birds such as emerald dove, island thrush and Christmas Island white eye, as well as introduced birds including red junglefowl and Java sparrow.

=== Enemies and Competitors ===
There is a known instance of a Christmas goshawk preying upon a 5–6 week old Abbott's booby chick on 5 September 2005, in which an adult female goshawk knocked the booby chick off its nest and caused it to fall to its death. The raptor attempted to drag its prey away but as the chick was heavier than the goshawk, she could only drag her prey about a meter away. About 20 minutes afterwards a robber crab was seen approaching the goshawk and dead chick, and after a tug-of-war lasting approximately 8 minutes the raptor retreated, allowing the robber crab to successfully steal the carcass and escape with it into a hole under a log.

== Status and conservation ==
The goshawk is listed as endangered under the Environment Protection and Biodiversity Conservation Act 1999. There are no detailed population statistics for the goshawks, though the population is small and it has been estimated that there are no more than 100 mature birds, or 50 breeding pairs, on the island. The principal threat comes from yellow crazy ants which were accidentally introduced to the island. The threat is not only that of ant predation of goshawk nestlings, but also indirectly from potentially massive changes to the ecology of the island caused by the ants.
