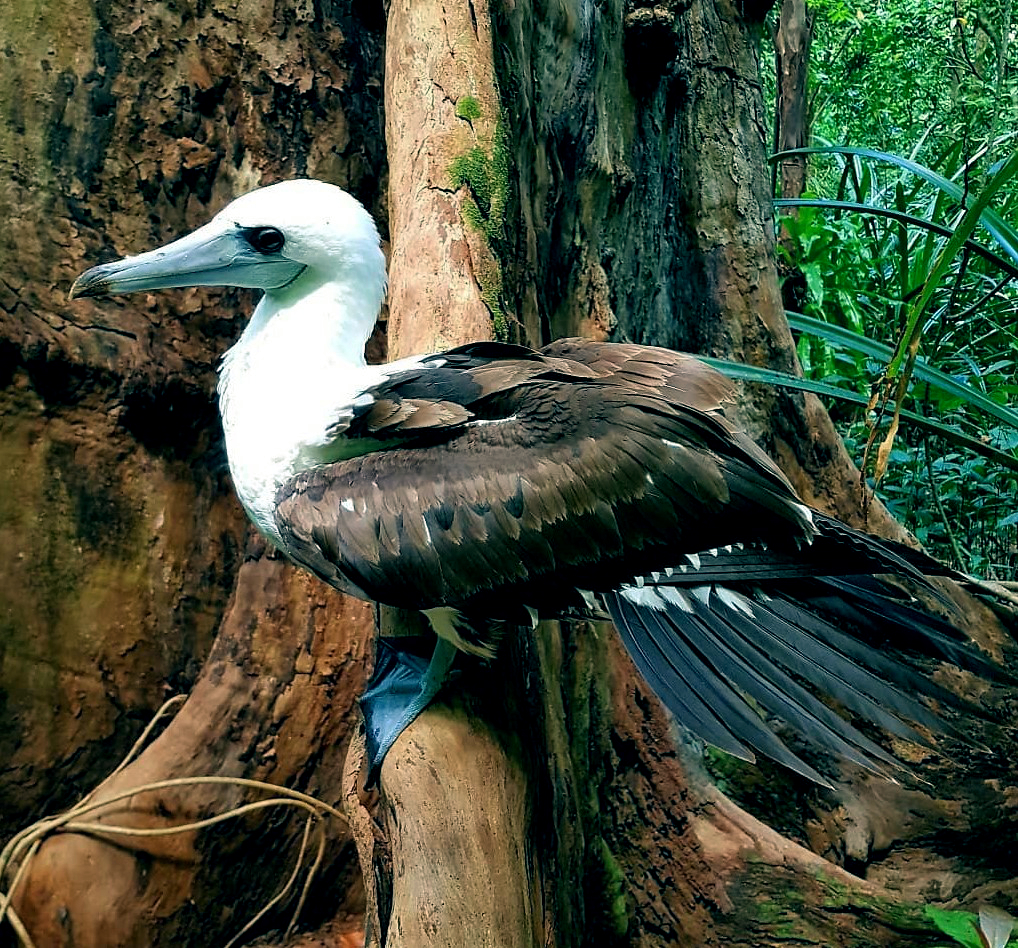

Conservation status
- Endangered (IUCN 3.1)
- CITES Appendix I

Scientific classification
- Kingdom: Animalia
- Phylum: Chordata
- Class: Aves
- Order: Suliformes
- Family: Sulidae
- Genus: Papasula; Olson & Warheit, 1988
- Species: P. abbotti

Binomial name
- Papasula abbotti (Ridgway, 1893)
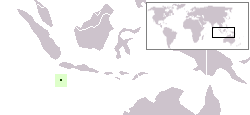
- Christmas Island in green

Synonyms
- Sula abbotti (Ridgway, 1893)

= Abbott's booby =

Species of bird

Abbott's booby (Papasula abbotti) is an endangered seabird of the sulid family, which includes gannets and boobies. It is a large booby and is placed within its own monotypic genus. It was first identified from a specimen collected by William Louis Abbott, who discovered it on Assumption Island in 1892.

Abbott's booby breeds only in a few spots on the Australian territory of Christmas Island in the eastern Indian Ocean, although it formerly had a much wider range. It has white plumage with black markings, and is adapted for long-distance flight. It forages around Christmas Island, often around nutrient-rich oceanic upwellings, although individuals can travel for thousands of kilometres. Pairs mate for life and raise one chick every two or three years, nesting near the top of emergent trees in the rainforest canopy.

The population is decreasing. Historically, much of its former habitat was logged to make way for phosphate mining. Some logging continues, and the effects of the former logging continue to adversely affect the current population. Another threat has been caused by the introduction of yellow crazy ants, which decrease habitat quality. Minimal habitat declines have a significant effect on the bird population. All nesting areas have been included in a national park.

== Taxonomy ==
The first specimen was collected from Assumption Island in 1892 by American naturalist William Louis Abbott, northwest of Madagascar, although debate exists as to whether he actually collected it from the nearby Glorioso Island. It was described by Robert Ridgway in 1893. In 1988, it was placed in its own genus by Olson & Warheit 1988.

A 2011 study of multiple genes indicated that Papasula is the sister group to all other gannets and boobies, and likely diverged from them around 22 million years ago. Previously, some characters present in this species were thought to indicate that Papasula diverged from other sulid lineages prior to the split between gannets and other boobies. In 1997, analysis of the mitochondrial cytochrome b gene indicated that Abbott's booby sister to the gannets, rather than being most closely related to the other boobies. This inference may stem from incomplete lineage sorting or from long branch attraction problems.

A subfossil subspecies from the Mascarene Islands of Mauritius and Rodrigues was named P. a. nelsoni in 2023. Another subfossil subspecies named P. a. costelloi lived on Hiva Oa, one of the Marquesas Islands in the South Pacific, and became extinct in the Late Quaternary Period.

The subspecies are:

- P. a. abbotti (Christmas Island booby)
- † P. a. nelsoni (Mascarene booby)
- † P. a. costelloi (Hiva Oa booby)

== Description ==
Abbott's booby is the largest of all booby species, and is adapted to long-distance flight. Individuals can reach 80 cm (31 in) from beak to tail, and weigh about 1.5 kg (3.3 lb). It is distinguished from other sulids in the region by its black and white plumage; the only other bird with similar coloration and shape is the masked booby, which has an all-white body with black wings only. They have an off-white plumage, which contrasts with black eye patches, black wings and tails, and black flank marks. Their feet are blue and webbed, with black outer ends. Males have pale grey bills with a black tip, whereas females have pink bills with a black tip. Chicks have white down and a cape of black scapular feathers.

Juvenile birds have plumage similar to adults, unlike other species of boobies.

== Distribution and habitat ==
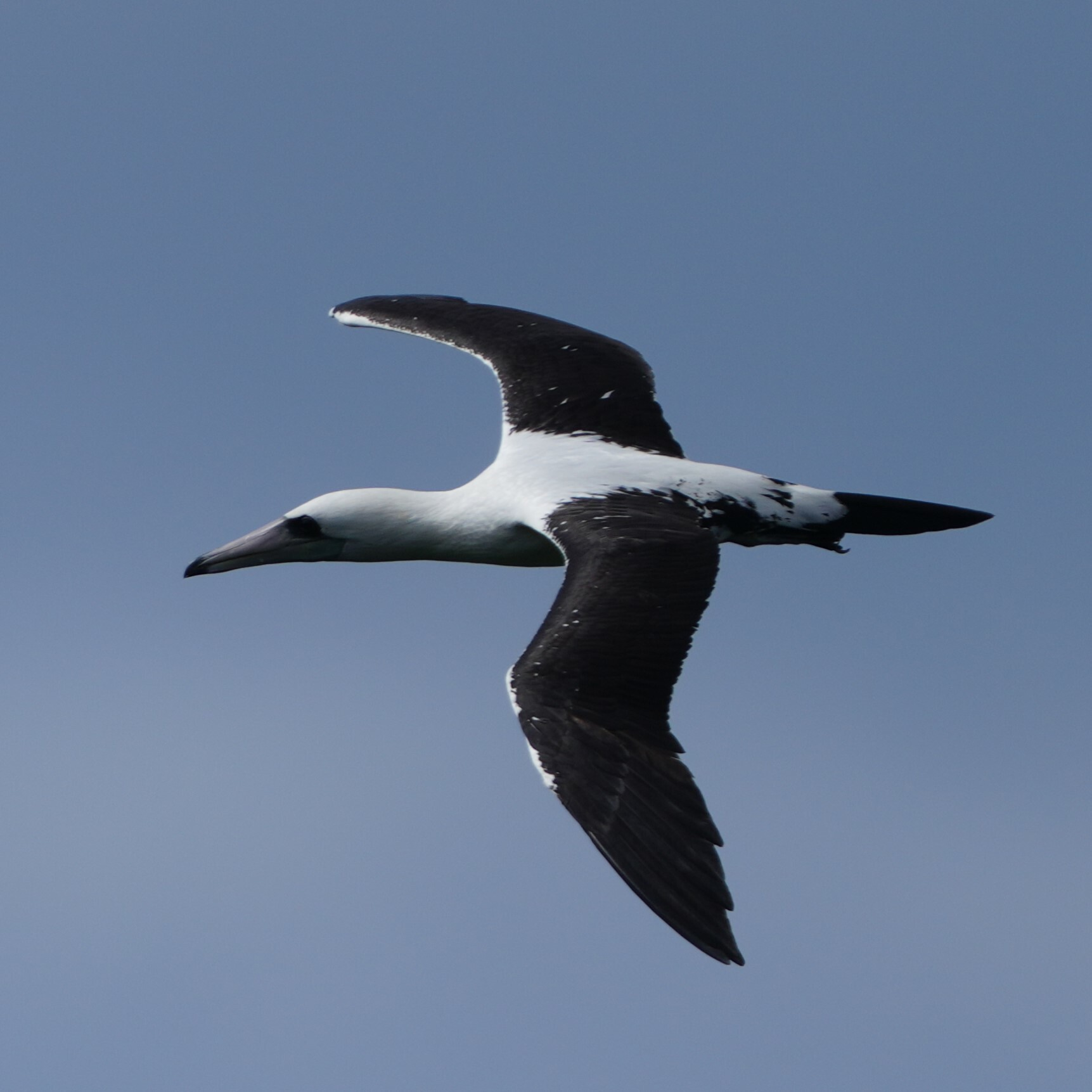
On Christmas Island

Abbott's booby is the only booby restricted to a single location, although its former distribution covered much of the Indian and Pacific Oceans. Fossil evidence indicates its former presence in the South Pacific, and eyewitness reports of it formerly breeding on the Mascarene Islands. In April 2007, an individual of this species was photographed at a booby colony on Rota in the Pacific Ocean, and the same individual has been seen off-and-on in the red-footed booby colony there through at least 2024.

It breeds in tall trees in the plateau forests of the central and western areas of Christmas Island, and in the upper terrace forests of the north coast. Nest distribution is patchy, based on topography, with the majority of nests in trees on uneven terrain. Nests are usually built on Syzygium nervosum and Planchonella nitida trees, although emergent Tristiropsis acutangula trees are sometimes used. Due to the trade winds flowing south-east from April to November, trees that can be approached from the northwest are favoured.

Its foraging range usually reaches 40–100 km (25–62 mi) from Christmas Island, although individuals are often seen in Indonesia and vagrants reach as far as mainland Australia. A single female was recently observed on Rota, northeast of Guam in the Pacific, and some records from the Banda Sea indicate either an even larger range or unknown breeding colonies.

== Population ==
The Abbott's booby population is the best documented, and smallest, of all sulid populations. It was first assessed in 1967, resulting in an estimate of 2,300 breeding pairs. By 1983, the number of breeding pairs had declined to 1,900. The most comprehensive survey was made in 1991, and included new breeding sites that were unknown in previous surveys. It brought the estimate of breeding pairs up to 2,500, with the total number of mature individuals being placed at 6,000. A helicopter survey in 2002 noted 1,500 nest sites. The population was stable from 1991 to 2002.

The population size is estimated to decrease more than 80% over the next three generations, or 120 years. The current decline is attributed to a low recruitment rate and the negative effects of wind turbulence on a breeding population. Due to its small population, limited habitat, low fecundity, and limited distribution, Abbott's booby is at high risk of extinction if further habitat disturbance occurs.

== Ecology ==
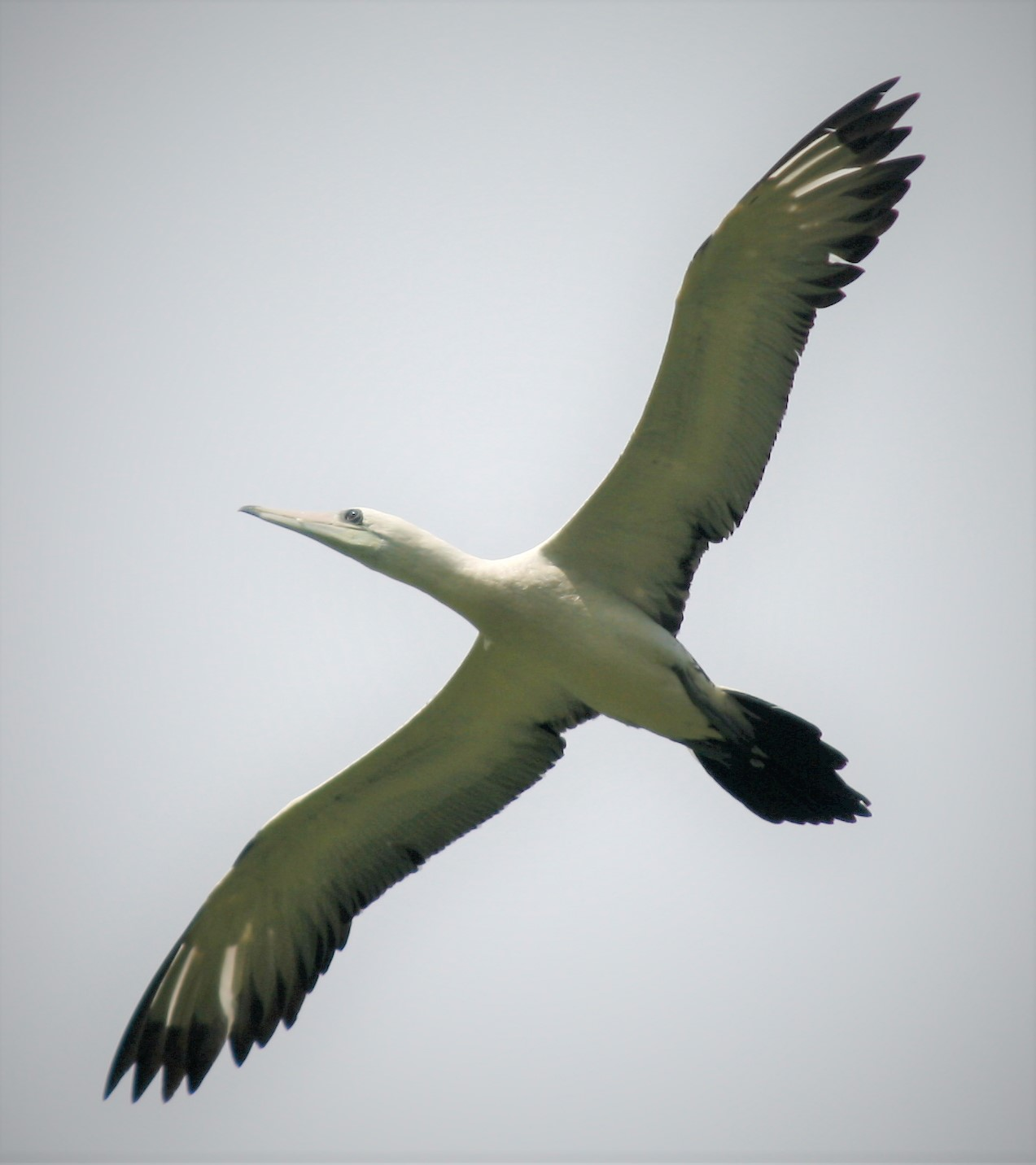
In flight

Individuals are solitary, long-distance travellers that can range thousands of kilometres from Christmas Island. They are very vocal, with a wide range of calls. Due to their size, they require a large clear space to take off. So, they nest near the tops of trees. If an individual falls to the forest floor, it will starve unless it can climb high enough to be able to catch the wind and take off. Adults rarely fight owing to the risk of falling. Fledglings must succeed in their first attempt at flight; unsuccessful attempts rarely result in the fledgling's survival.

Adults forage at sea from October to April, although they return if they have a chick that is dependent on them. They forage in offshore waters, eating fish and squid. No feeding patterns are known, although they are thought to forage in an ocean upwelling off Java, 300 km (186 mi) northwest of Christmas Island. Chicks are fed through complete regurgitation for the first two weeks, then incomplete regurgitation. Both parents feed the young.

=== Breeding ===
Courtship takes the form of a face-to-face display. Partners mate for life, and maintain the same nest site throughout their lives. Nests are made near the top of rainforest trees, 10–40 m (33–131 ft) off the ground, usually at elevations of 150 m (492 ft) or higher. Breeding cycles last 15–18 months, and only one egg is laid during each cycle. Successful pairs can nest once every two years, but often take rest years between attempts to raise a chick. These rest years are taken even if the couple is unsuccessful in raising their chick. Most pairs only breed once every three years.

Mating usually takes place in April, and eggs are laid between April and July. Eggs are equal to 8% of the female's body weight. They are incubated under the webbed feet of the parents, which become vascularised and warm. Incubation is undertaken by both parents, which take shifts of up to two days. Eggs are incubated for about 56 days, which is 30 days longer than in other sulids. Chicks hatch from June to November, after the eggs are incubated around 56 days. They take 170 days to fully fledge, and an additional 200 days to become fully independent. Most chicks make their first flight in December or January. Fledglings reach maturity around eight years of age, and can live up to 40 years.

== Threats and conservation ==
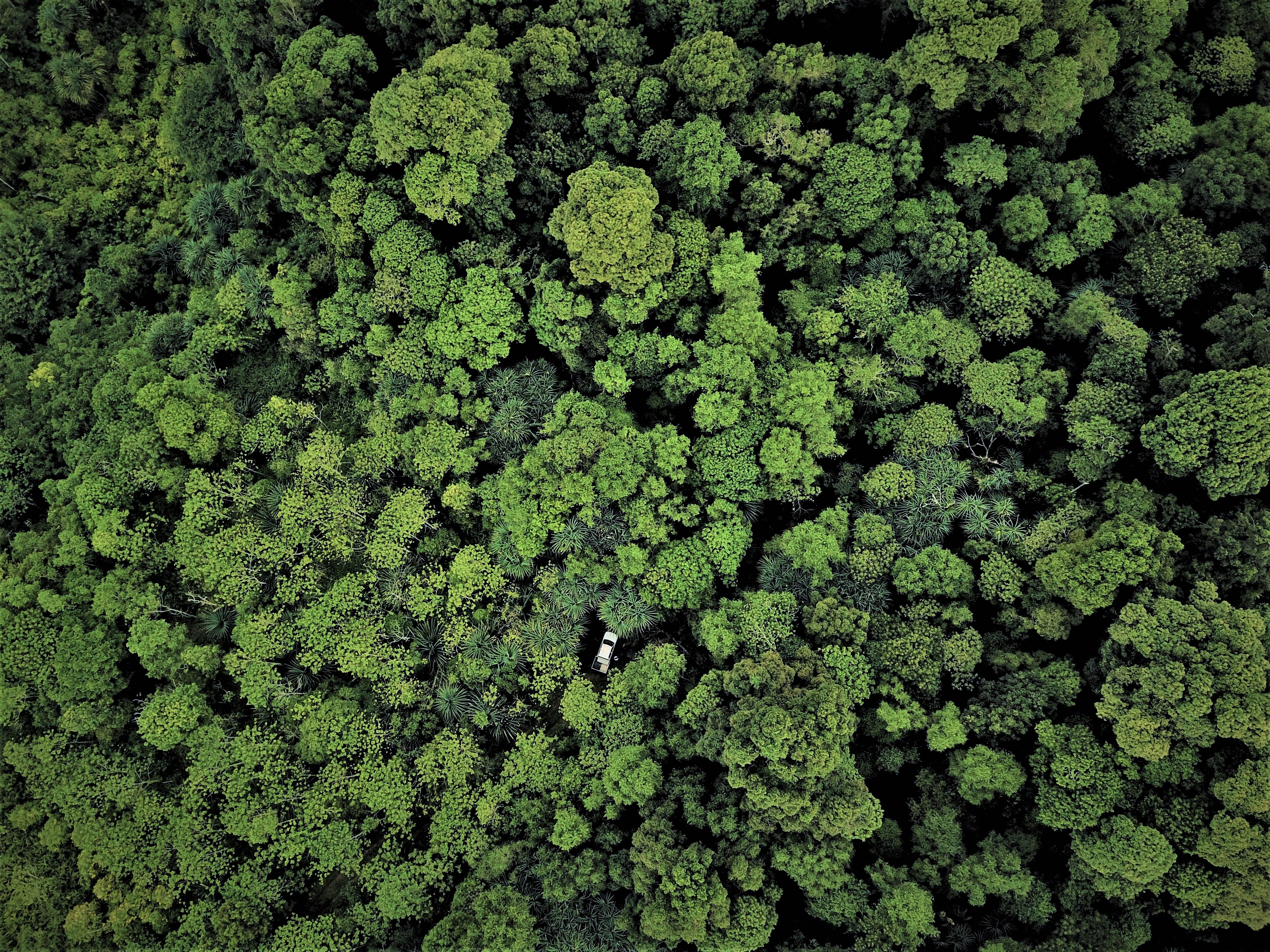
Conservation work for the Abbott's Booby on Christmas Island. A drone is launched from the gaps within the canopies to explore for potential nesting sites. The birds can be detected through their predominantly white color against green foliage.

Even a minimal decline in habitat quality can have a significant impact on these birds. During 1965–1987, phosphate mining destroyed one-third of the Abbott's booby's nesting habitat. Degeneration has continued, with the health of individual trees decreasing. Clearings left over from logging have increased wind in the canopy, generating turbulence up to 300 m (984 ft) downwind of the clearings. This causes lower breeding success due to chicks being dislodged and not surviving their first flight. Adult survival is also reduced due to increased risk of them falling to the ground when landing. This affects 36% of the current population.

Introduced plants are foiling habitat rehabilitation in abandoned mining sites and pose a risk if they invade primary forest. Continued mining remains an issue, with mature secondary forest cleared for mining in 2007. A request to mine in what is currently 250 half of forest was turned down in 2007, but is under appeal. Christmas Island Phosphates Pty Ltd. may not clear primary forest, and requires a permit to clear regrowth.

Christmas Island National Park includes all known Abbott's booby nest sites. It was created in 1980 and was subsequently expanded to cover 60% of the island. The population was monitored from 1982 to 1993, and in 1984, 20% of mined areas next to nesting sites had been replanted. The Environment Australia Abbott's Booby Recovery Plan aims to regenerate forests and help prevent further decline in the species. Forest rehabilitation has now been attempted in about 30% of abandoned mining areas, with a focus on areas close to primary forest where new growth could act as a wind break. Most of the planted trees are foundation species, with non-native species being used if they do not invade the environment. Part of the forest regeneration project is financed by the phosphate mining company as part of their lease agreement.

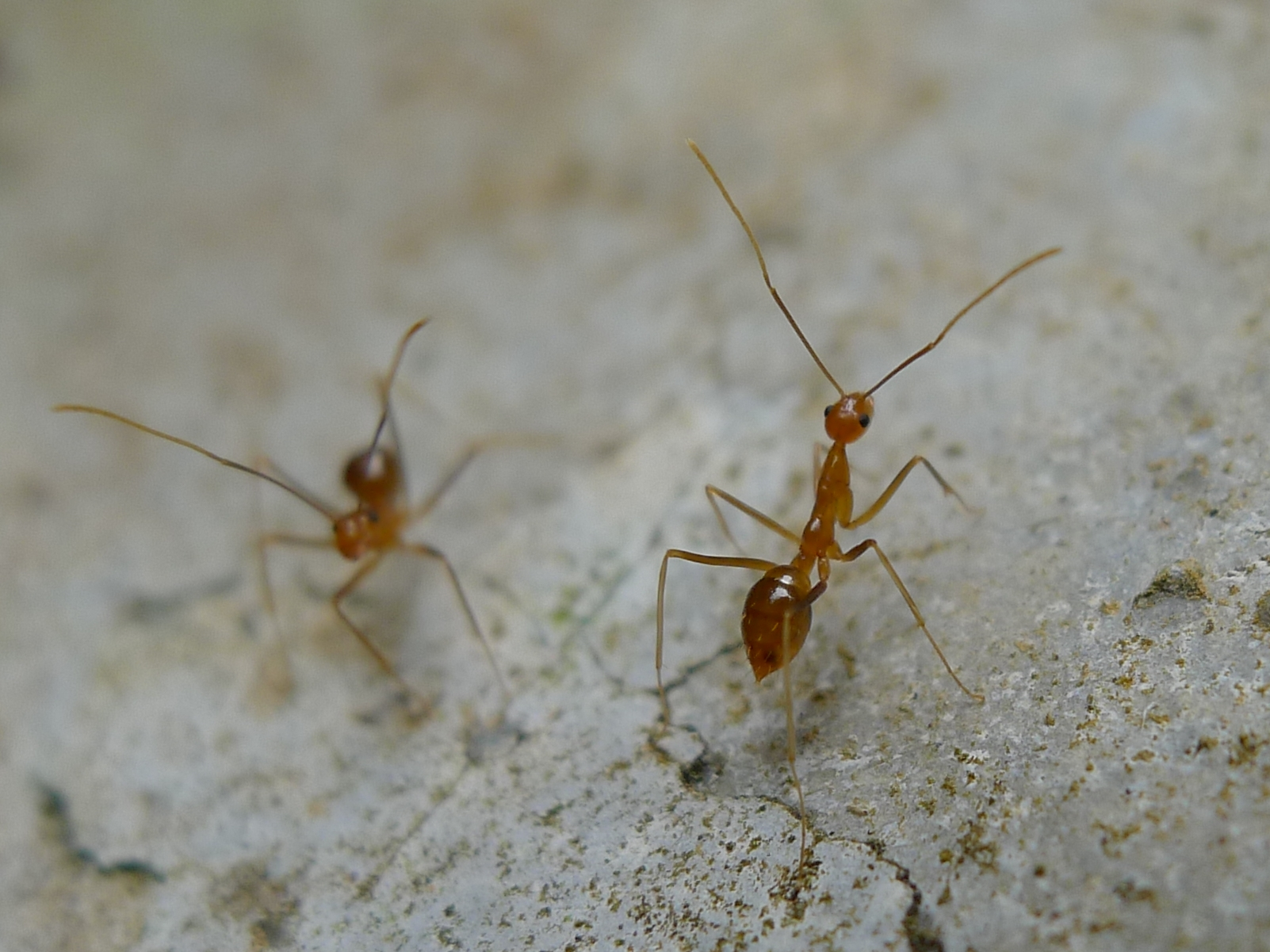
Yellow crazy ants

An invasion of the yellow crazy ant poses continued risk for the booby population. Yellow crazy ants formed supercolonies in the 1990s and spread throughout 28% of the island's forest. Starting in 2000, efforts to control it eliminated it from 2,800 ha of forest, resulting in a 95% reduction of its range. The range was 300 ha in 2005, at much lower densities than originally, although it has slightly recovered since then. The ants could prey on nestlings and cause nest abandonment, although this has not been observed. They do, however, disrupt the ecosystem by killing red crabs, and farm scale insects that damage the trees where the boobies nest.

Overfishing and marine pollution pose additional problems for the population. The birds may be directly hunted or caught as bycatch in longline fishing, as they may come into contact with Indonesian and Taiwanese fisheries. This has not been documented.

Plans for a satellite launch pad to be built on the island have been discussed, but are not currently being put into action.

In 1988, a cyclone destroyed a third of all nests and fledglings. Climate change resulting in increased sea surface temperatures, changes in rainfall patterns, and changes in the El Niño Southern Oscillation may further damage the population due to changing weather patterns. The increase in sea temperatures reduces breeding success, as the best feeding is found in cold water caused by nutrient-rich upwellings.

Abbott's booby is listed under CITES Appendix I, and is classified as endangered in the IUCN Redlist. It is also classified as endangered under the Australian Environment Protection and Biodiversity Conservation Act 1999. Many Abbott's boobies are in the National Park, so their nests are monitored.
