= Planchonella duclitan =

Conservation status
- Least Concern (IUCN 3.1)

Scientific classification
- Kingdom: Plantae
- Clade: Embryophytes
- Clade: Tracheophytes
- Clade: Spermatophytes
- Clade: Angiosperms
- Clade: Eudicots
- Clade: Asterids
- Order: Ericales
- Family: Sapotaceae
- Genus: Planchonella
- Species: P. duclitan

Binomial name
- Planchonella duclitan (Blanco) Bakh.f.

Synonyms
- List: *Beccariella balitbitan (Blanco) Pierre; *Beccariella celebica Pierre; *Beccariella duclitan (Blanco) Pierre; *Chrysophyllum rhodoneurum Hassk.; *Chrysophyllum sundaicum Miq.; *Planchonella celebica (Pierre ex Burck) Dubard; *Planchonella nitida (Blume) Dubard; *Planchonella sundaica (Burck) Dubard; *Pouteria duclitan (Blanco) Baehni; *Sideroxylon balitbitan Blanco; *Sideroxylon celebicum Pierre ex Burck; *Sideroxylon duclitan Blanco; *Sideroxylon nitidum Blume; *Sideroxylon ramiflorum Merr.; *Sideroxylon sundaicum Burck; *Xantolis nitida (Blume) Baehni

Species of plant

Planchonella duclitan is a species of plant in the family Sapotaceae. This tree can reach up to a height of 40 meters (130 ft), presenting glossy leaves and orange fruit. It is common on Christmas Island, dominating up to 20% of the upper leaf canopy, as a tree to 30 meters (98 ft), in established forest or around 40% in regenerating habitat where it may attain the maximum height.

The species has been described as Planchonella nitida (Blume) Dubard, later regarded as a synonym for this treatment. The tree is used as a nest site by Abbott's booby, a sea-bird species Papasula abbotti, and its fruit and flowers provide food for the fruit bat Pteropus natalis.
