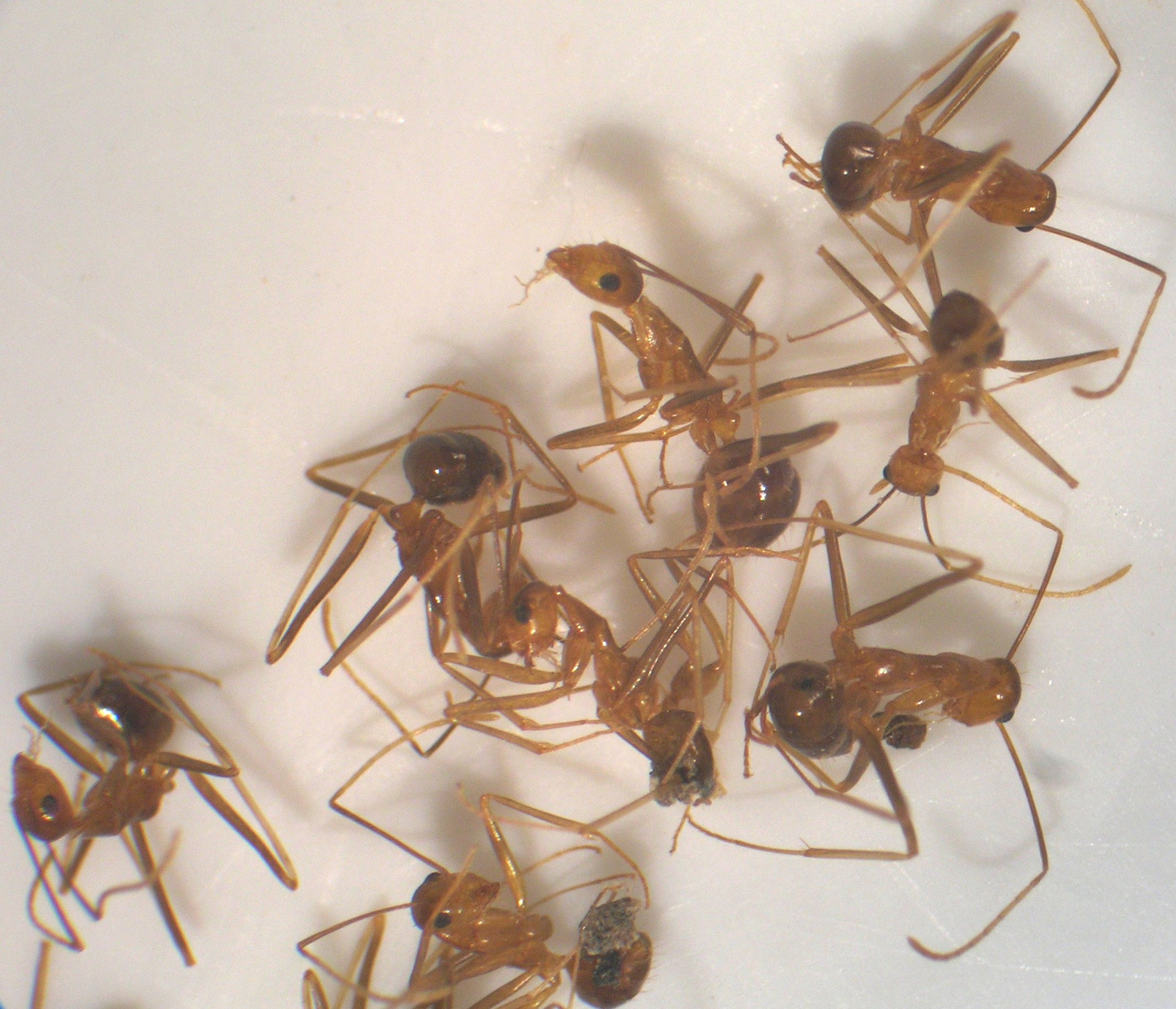

Scientific classification
- Kingdom: Animalia
- Phylum: Arthropoda
- Clade: Pancrustacea
- Class: Insecta
- Order: Hymenoptera
- Family: Formicidae
- Subfamily: Formicinae
- Genus: Anoplolepis
- Species: A. gracilipes

Binomial name
- Anoplolepis gracilipes F. Smith, 1857

Synonyms
- Formica longipes Plagiolepis longipes Anoplolepis longipes

= Yellow crazy ant =

Anoplolepis gracilipes

Species of ant (Anoplolepis gracilipes)

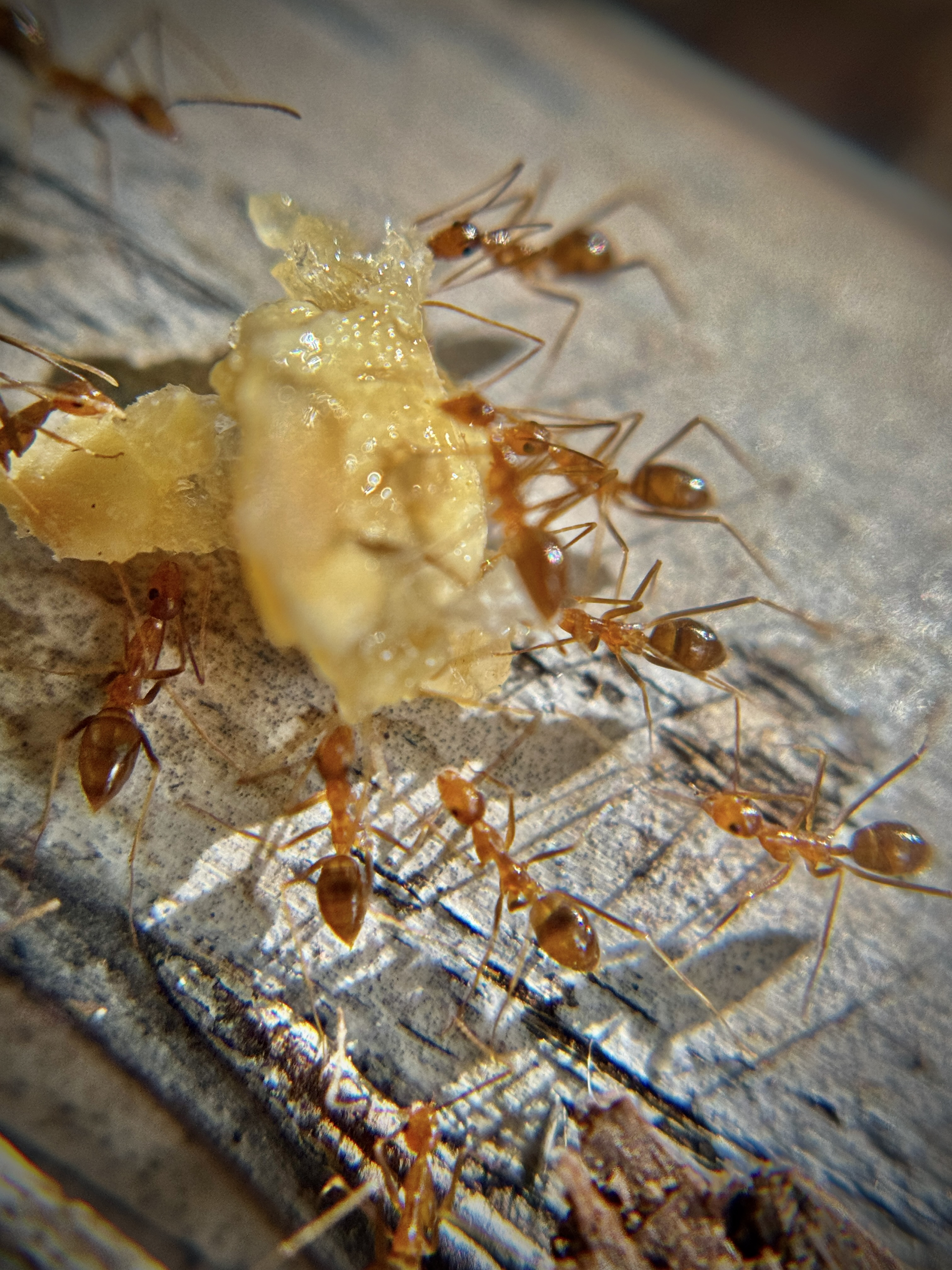
Yellow crazy ants baited with peanut butter on Maui Island, Hawai'i - U.S.A. (2025).

The yellow crazy ant (Anoplolepis gracilipes), also known as the long-legged ant or Maldive ant, is a species of ant, thought to be native to Asia. They have been accidentally introduced to numerous places in the world's tropics.

The yellow crazy ant has colloquially been given the modifier "crazy" on account of the ant's erratic movements when disturbed. Its long legs and antennae make it one of the largest invasive ant species in the world.

Like several other invasive ants, such as the red imported fire ant (Solenopsis invicta), the big-headed ant (Pheidole megacephala), the little fire ant (Wasmannia auropunctata), and the Argentine ant (Linepithema humile), the yellow crazy ant is a "tramp ant", a species that easily becomes established and dominant in new habitat due to traits such as aggression toward other ant species, little aggression toward members of its own species, efficient recruitment, and large colony size.

It is on a list of "one hundred of the world's worst invasive species" formulated by the International Union for Conservation of Nature (IUCN), having invaded ecosystems from Hawaii to the Seychelles, and formed supercolonies on Christmas Island in the Indian Ocean.

In 2023, a scientific article postulated a unique reproductive cycle for A. gracilipes, suggesting that males are obligate chimeras.

== Physiology ==
Anoplolepis gracilipes is a relatively large, yellow to orange ant with long legs, large eyes and extremely long antennal scapes.

Although A. gracilipes is the only invasive species in the genus Anoplolepis, there are several other genera for which it can be mistaken. Both Leptomyrmex and Oecophylla can be confused with Anoplolepis because of their similar sizes and very long limbs. Anoplolepis can be distinguished from Leptomyrmex by the presence of an acidopore, while Anoplolepis can be distinguished from Oecophylla by the more compact petiole. Although both of these genera occur in the Pacific, neither contain any invasive species.

Several species of invasive ants belonging to the genera Camponotus and Paratrechina can appear similar to A. gracilipes. Although several invasive species of Pheidole can also be slender-bodied with long legs and long antennal scapes, they can be separated from A. gracilipes by their two-segmented waists.

A. gracilipes is widespread across the tropics, and populations are especially dense in the Pacific region. The species is most infamous for causing the ecological "meltdown" of Christmas Island. Although widespread across the Pacific, A. gracilipes can cause significant damage to native biological diversity. Strong quarantine measures are encouraged to keep it from spreading to new localities.

== Geographical range and dispersal ==
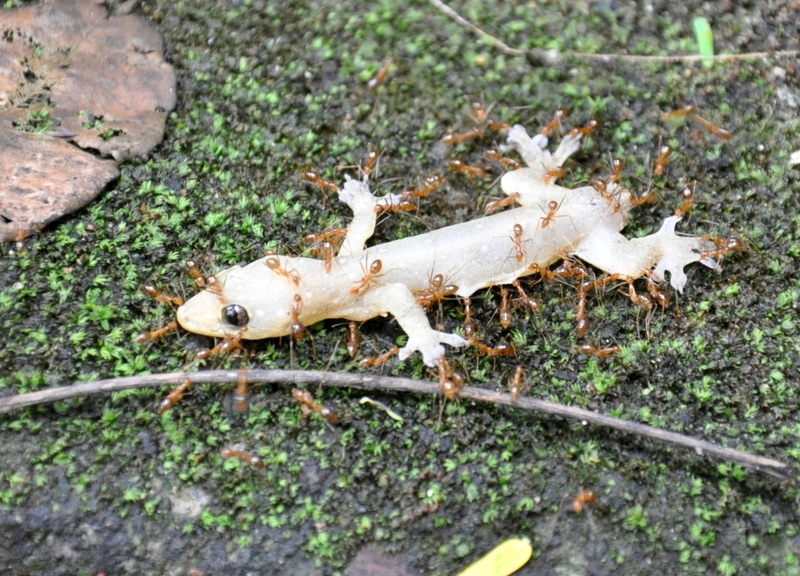
A dead gecko being dragged by yellow crazy ants in India

The yellow crazy ant's natural habitats are the moist tropical lowlands of Southeast Asia, and surrounding areas and islands in the Indian and Pacific Oceans. It has been introduced into a wide range of tropical and subtropical environments including northern Australia, some of the Caribbean islands, some Indian Ocean islands (Seychelles, Madagascar, Mauritius, Réunion, the Cocos Islands and the Christmas Islands) and some Pacific islands (New Caledonia, Hawaii, French Polynesia, Okinawa, Vanuatu, Micronesia, Johnston Atoll, and the Galapagos archipelago). The species has been known to occupy such agricultural systems as cinnamon, citrus, coffee and coconut plantations. Because yellow crazy ants have generalized nesting habits, they are able to disperse via trucks, boats and other forms of human transport.

Crazy ant colonies naturally disperse through "budding", i.e. when mated queens and workers leave the nest to establish a new one, and only rarely through flight via female winged reproductive forms. Generally, colonies that disperse through budding have a lower rate of dispersal, requiring human intervention to reach distant areas. It has been recorded that A. gracilipes moves as much as 400 m (1,300 ft) a year in the Seychelles. A survey on Christmas Island, however, yielded an average spreading speed of 3 meters (9.8 ft) per day, the equivalent of one km (0.6 mi) per year.

== Diet ==
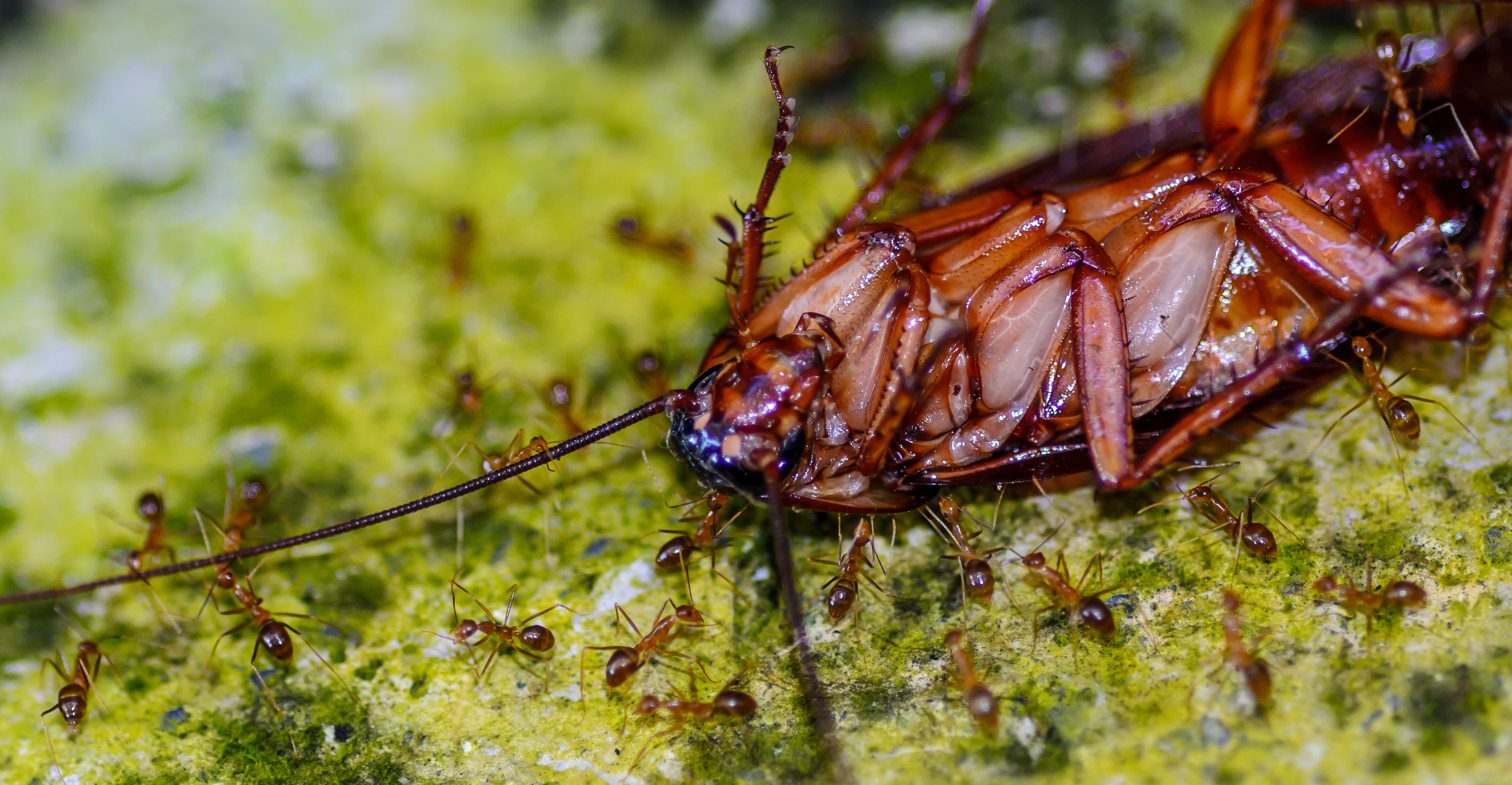
A. gracilipes moving a dead American cockroach (Periplaneta americana) toward their nest in Pohnpei, Federated States of Micronesia

A gracilipes has been described as a "scavenging predator" exhibiting a broad diet, a characteristic of many invasive species. It consumes a wide variety of foods, including grains, seeds, arthropods, and decaying matter such as vertebrate corpses. They have been reported to attack and dismember invertebrates such as small isopods, myriapods, molluscs, arachnids, land crabs, earthworms and insects.

Like all ants, A gracilipes requires a protein-rich food source for the queen to lay eggs and carbohydrates as energy for the workers. They get their carbohydrates from plant nectar and honeydew producing insects, especially scale insects, aphids, and other Sternorrhyncha. Studies indicate that crazy ants rely so much on scale insects that a scarcity of them can actually limit ant population growth.

== Reproduction ==
Similar to other ants, the queen produces eggs which are fertilized by male sperm that are stored in sperm stores. When an egg is fertilized, there are three distinct events that can happen: (i) the resulting diploid organism develops into a queen if the egg is fertilized by an R sperm or (ii) into an infertile diploid worker if the egg is fertilized by a W sperm. However, a third outcome has been described in a 2023 scientific study: (iii) the egg is fertilized by a W sperm but the parental nuclei bypasses the fusion of the two gametes and divide separately within the same egg, leading to a haploid male that is chimeric with a portion of cells carrying the W genome and a portion of cells carrying the R genome. Interestingly, not all tissues have equal proportions of each cell line, with sperm cells mostly carrying the W genome and thus providing the W alleles with a fitness advantage. This is the first known case of obligate chimerism in animals.

== Mutualism ==
Crazy ants obtain much of their food requirements from scale insects, which are plant pests that feed on sap of trees and release honeydew, a sugary liquid. Ants eat honeydew, and in return protect the scale insects from their enemies and spread them among trees, an example of mutualism. The honeydew not eaten by the ants drips onto the trees and encourages the growth of mold over the leaves and stems.

The ants protect the insects by "nannying" the mobile crawler stages and protecting them against their natural enemies. Experiments have shown that this connection is so strong that, in environments where A. gracilipes was removed, the density of scale insects dropped by 67% within 11 weeks, and to zero after 12 months.

== In Australia ==
In Australia, yellow crazy ants have been found at more than 30 sites in Queensland, and in Arnhem Land in the Northern Territory, where a large scattered population exists. A single New South Wales infestation was detected and eradicated, and, in Western Australia, yellow crazy ants have been intercepted in shipping freight arriving at Fremantle.

Queensland's main infestation is 830 hectares (2,100 acres) in and around Wet Tropics of Queensland rainforest, a World Heritage Site. The Northern Territory infestation covers 2,500 square kilometres (970 sq mi), an area larger than the Australian Capital Territory.

Climate modelling indicates yellow crazy ants could spread across northern Australia from Queensland to Western Australia, across much of Queensland and into coastal and inland parts of New South Wales. Areas with the most ideal habitat and climatic conditions, such as the Wet Tropics of Queensland rainforests, are likely to experience the highest impacts.

A cost–benefit analysis by the Queensland government undertaken in 2012 found that yellow crazy ants could cost Australia's economy over A$3 billion if the ants were not treated. This analysis did not take potential impacts on Australia's biodiversity into account. The known impacts of crazy ants in tropical rainforests overseas may provide useful insights into these impacts, bearing in mind that the most significant impacts are associated with relatively small islands, such as Christmas Island.

== Impact on Christmas Island ==
Crazy ants have had a profound impact on the biodiversity of Christmas Island.

The crazy ant has a significant destructive impact on the island's ecosystem, killing and displacing crabs on the forest floor. The supercolonies also devastate crab numbers migrating to the coast. This has seen a rapid depletion in the number of land crabs — killing up to 20 million of them — which are vital to Christmas Island's biodiversity; land crabs are a keystone species in the forest ecology: they dig burrows, turn over the soil, and fertilize it with their droppings.

Seedlings that were previously eaten by crabs started to grow and, as a result, changed the structure of the forest. Weeds have spread into the rainforest because there are no crabs to control them. One of the most noticeable changes in the forest is the increased numbers of the stinging tree Dendrocnide peltata, which now flourishes in many areas frequently visited by humans. The forest canopy also changed as the scale insects tended by yellow crazy ants multiplied and killed mature trees.

Christmas Island red crabs are completely wiped out in infested areas. Populations of other ground and canopy dwelling animals, such as reptiles and other leaf litter fauna, have also decreased. During crab migrations, many crabs move through areas infested with ants and are killed. Studies show that the ant has displaced an estimated 15–20 million crabs by occupying their burrows, killing and eating resident crabs, and using their burrows as nest sites. This factor has greatly depleted red crabs, and made their annual land migrations far more perilous.

Although crazy ants do not bite or sting, they spray formic acid as a defence mechanism and to subdue their prey. In areas of high ant density, the movement of a land crab disturbs the ants and, as a result, the ants instinctively spray formic acid as a form of defence. The high levels of formic acid at ground level eventually overwhelm the crabs, and they are usually blinded then eventually die from dehydration (while attempting to flush off the formic acid) and exhaustion. As the dead crabs decay, the protein becomes available to the ants.

Crazy ants kill fauna, but encourage scale insects. Increased densities of scale insects cause forest dieback, and even the death of large forest trees. These changes create a cascade of negative impacts, including weed invasion, significantly altering the forest landscape.

=== Supercolonies ===
Christmas Island is a focal point for international control efforts. These supercolonies spread farther and cause more damage than single colonies, and they pose the single greatest known threat to the island's biodiversity.

Staff from Christmas Island National Park have worked in recent years to keep ant numbers in check. With help from the Christmas Island Crazy Ant Scientific Advisory Panel and support from the Australian Government they are holding ground.

Another supercolony nearly devastated the bird fauna of Johnston Atoll in the Pacific Ocean. The single massive colony was found to occupy nearly a quarter of the island, with up to 1,000 queens in a plot of land 6 metres (20 ft) wide. The infestation is thought to have been eradicated.

=== Control measures ===
To reduce the impacts of crazy ants on red crabs and Christmas Island's ecosystems the Parks Australia carried out a major aerial baiting program in 2009, to follow up the first aerial baiting conducted in 2002. The first step was conducting an extensive island-wide survey to determine the exact locations of the supercolonies. For several months, staff traversed the island surveying over 900 sites. The result was a map of crazy ant supercolonies and red crab burrow densities, together with other biodiversity data.

In September 2009, a helicopter was used to precisely bait crazy ant supercolonies, which covered 784 hectares (1,940 acres) of the island. A very low concentration of fipronil bait (0.1%) was used to control the ants. Monthly monitoring of these baited supercolony sites shows that crazy ant densities were reduced by 99%.

Park staff placed a high emphasis on minimising non-target impact of baiting. Food lures were dropped from a helicopter to attract robber crabs away from areas that were about to be baited. This technique, combined with the low concentration fipronil bait, proved to be highly successful with extremely low numbers of robber crabs and no red crabs known to be killed by the baiting.

While baiting has slowed the decline of the red crab, its effects on the crazy ant populations are only temporary, as escaping colonies invade the treated areas again, and it is expensive, requiring much man power. In an effort to find a better control, after research, Australian Parks in December 2016 imported Tachardiaephagus somervillei, a small (2 millimetres (5/64 in)) wasp and began breeding them for release. The wasp, which attacks only scale insects, is a voracious predator of what is believed to be one of the crazy ant's largest source of honeydew on Christmas Island, the yellow lac scale insect.

Researchers from La Trobe University in Melbourne, funded by Parks Australia, began looking for biological controls in 2009. While the ants are omnivores, studies have shown honeydew is an important part of the diet of Christmas Island crazy ants. Samples of ants taken from colonies that are growing rapidly have more honeydew in their diet than when the colonies decline. Further, restricting access to honeydew, by binding trees where the scale insects feed, dramatically reduced the colony as ant activity on the ground fell by 95% in just four weeks. In the laboratory, colonies with limited sources of sugar were compared to colonies with access to abundant sugar. Those with abundant sugar had more fertile queens and lower death rates among workers. The workers were also more aggressive toward other ant species and explored their environments more. This is believed to show why the ants decline when deprived of access to scale insects in the field, and confirm reduced honeydew will greatly reduce the ants' ability to form supercolonies.

While controlling the scale insect is expected to control the yellow crazy ant on Christmas Island, on mainland Australia it is thought this would not help. There are at least a dozen honeydew-producing insects as well as extrafloral nectar from native acacia trees, all of which fuel yellow crazy ants.

Experts continue to call for a fully funded, long-term baiting program on mainland Australia.
