= Christmas Island National Park =

National park in Christmas Island

- IUCN category II (national park)
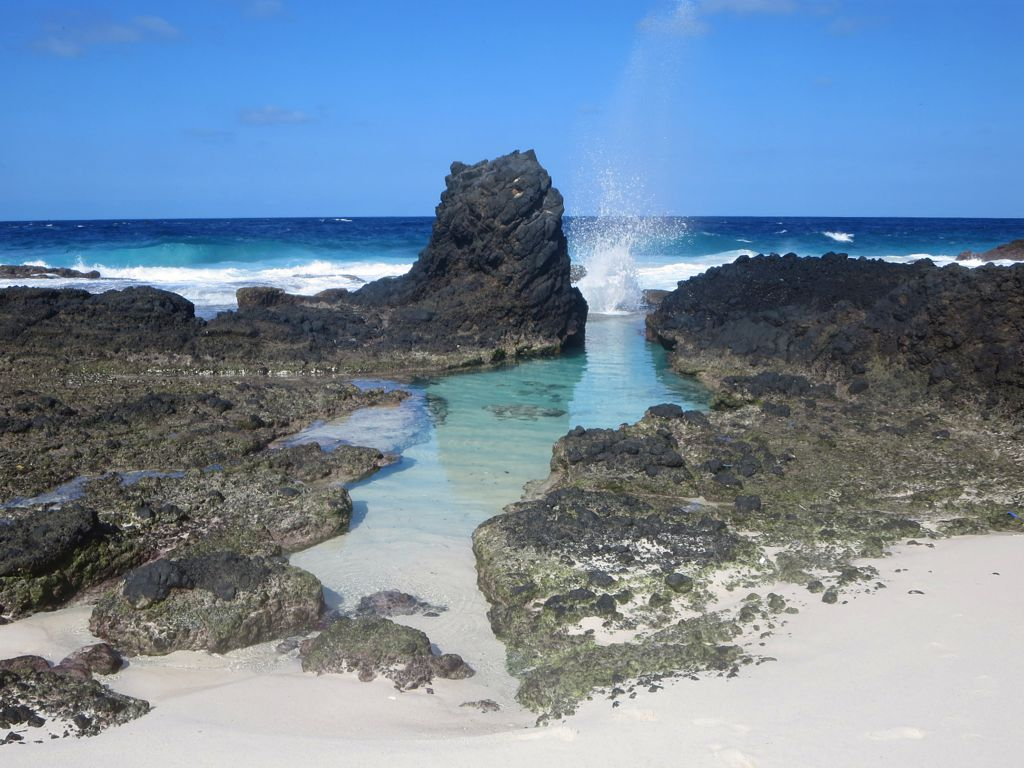
- Dolly Beach in Christmas Island National Park, Australia
- Interactive map of Christmas Island National Park
- Location: Australia
- Nearest city: Flying Fish Cove
- Coordinates: 10°25′S 105°40′E
- Area: 85 km^{2} (33 sq mi)
- Established: 1980
- Governing body: Director of National Parks
- Website: christmasislandnationalpark.gov.au

Christmas Island National Park is an Australian national park that includes most of Christmas Island, an Australian territory in the Indian Ocean southwest of Indonesia. The park is home to many species of animal and plant life, including the eponymous Christmas Island red crab, whose annual migration sees around 100 million crabs move to the sea to spawn. Christmas Island is the only nesting place for the endangered Abbott's booby and critically endangered Christmas Island frigatebird, and the wide range of other endemic species makes the island of significant interest to the scientific community.

== History ==
Concerns were expressed in the early 1970s about the effect of phosphate mining on the flora and fauna of Christmas Island. A particular focus was on the habitat of Abbott's booby (Papasula abbotti), which appeared in danger of extinction. In 1974, a governmental committee examined the environmental impact of mining and other commercial activities and advised on measures to protect the island. The committee's recommendation that an area of the island be set aside for conservation was implemented in a series of measures culminating in the establishment of the Christmas Island National Park on 21 February 1980 under the terms of the National Parks and Wildlife Conservation Act 1975.

The park initially covered the south-west corner of the island, and was extended in 1986 and 1989 to include most of the rainforest on the island. Today the park covers approximately 85 km^{2} (33 mi^{2}), or 63% of the island.

== Geology and geography ==
Christmas Island consists of an uplifted limestone cap metamorphosed from coral reefs overlying more ancient volcanic andesite bedrock. The underlying seamount lies some 500 km (310 mi) southwest of Indonesia, and the isolation by the abyssal zone has led to endemism amongst the marine ecosystem. The park's boundaries extend 50 m (160 ft) beyond the low water line. Approximately 46 km (29 mi) of the island's 73 km (45 mi) shoreline is within the park limits.

Many stretches of the shoreline are marked by rock platforms, which are filled by wave splashes to create rock pools. Sea cliffs, up to 60 m (200 ft) high in places, rise steeply from the sea and form a series of stepped terraces, the lower cliffs of which are higher and steeper. Soil on the island is generally poor, punctuated by limestone pinnacles, and tends to dehydrate during the dry season. The limestone is fractured and has created a substantial cave system. There are both water-filled and dry caves.

Christmas Island's two Ramsar sites, The Dales and Hosnies Spring, are contained within the park.

== Flora and fauna ==
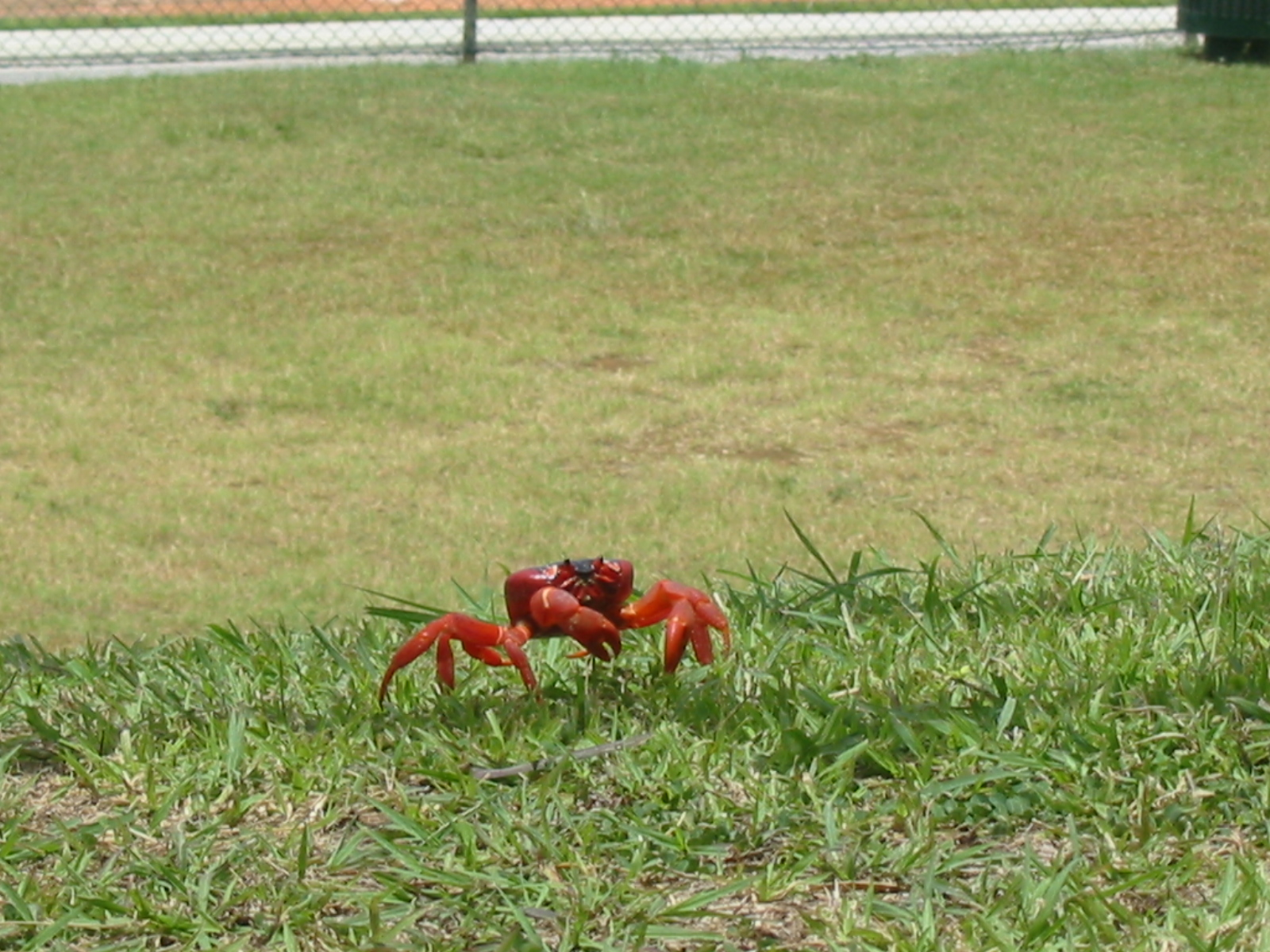
Gecarcoidea natalis, the Christmas Island red crab

Both the waters surrounding the island and its land surface are fecund, and the park exhibits a high level of biodiversity with many endemic species.

=== Fauna ===
==== Crabs ====
The island is particularly noted for its prodigious populations of Christmas Island red crabs (Gecarcoidea natalis), whose mass migrations at spawning time may number over a hundred million individuals. The bright red carapaces and sheer density of crabs make their routes to the sea observable from the air. Nonetheless, the populations of red crabs are threatened by the arrival of the invasive yellow crazy ant (Anoplolepis gracilipes). The ant was accidentally introduced between 1915 and 1934, and without any native ant species to compete against, rapidly formed 'supercolonies' of extremely high density. Populations of the ant have been observed bringing down red crabs over a hundred times their combined biomass. A. gracilipes is thought responsible for killing up to 30 million of the park's crabs.

While the red crab is Christmas Island's most numerous crab, the island also hosts the world's largest population of coconut crab (Birgus latro), the world's largest land invertebrate. There may be as many as one million coconut crabs on Christmas Island. It is also home to several species each of hermit crab, grapsids and gecarcinucoidea.

==== Reptiles ====
There are six species of reptile native to the park, of which five are endemic: the giant gecko (Cyrtodactylus sadlieri), the Christmas Island gecko (Lepidodactylus listeri), the forest skink (Emoia nativitatis), the blue-tailed skink (Cryptoblephanus egeriae) and the Christmas Island blind snake (Ramphotyphlops exocoeti). The foreshore skink (Emoia atrocostata) is native to the park, but is also to be found on other islands of the Indian Ocean. All have been showing decline in recent years.

A further five species of reptile have been reported, but all were introduced by human activity: the barking gecko (Hemidactylus frenatus), house gecko (Gehyra mutilata), black blind snake (Ramphotyphlops braminus), wolf snake (Lycodon aulicus capucinus) and grass skink (Subdoluseps bowringii).

==== Mammals ====
There are three species of mammal native to the park: the Christmas Island shrew (Crocidura trichura), listed as critically endangered, and possibly extinct; the small Christmas Island pipistrelle (Pipistrellus murrayi), listed as endangered and showing a rapid decrease in numbers; and the Christmas Island flying fox (Pteropus melanotus). The black rat (Rattus rattus) and house mouse (Mus musculus) have been introduced. Feral cats and dogs are also common, and stray into park territory.

==== Birds ====
There are over 100 species of birds, of which ten are endemic. Many birds are passing vagrants, such as the great cormorant (Phalacrocorax carbo). Others, like the lesser frigatebird (Fregata ariel), are more regular visitors. Bird populations are threatened due to the invasive yellow crazy ant, and reports have suggested that the ant has attacked hatchlings and harassed adults in their nests. All endemic bird species have been placed on the critically endangered list.

=== Flora ===
The dominant vegetation on the island is rainforest. Approximately 200 species of native flowering plant are to be found on Christmas Island. There are no mangroves on the park's coast. However, a stand of the normally estuarine mangrove species, Bruguiera gymnorhiza and B. sexangula, is found approximately 50 m (160 ft) above sea level, at Hosnies Spring.

== Park management ==
The park is managed by the Director of National Parks whose duties include protection of the park's natural areas, its lifeforms and genetic resources, to maintain ecological diversity, and to manage visitor access for educational, cultural and recreational purposes. It latest management plan (2002) listed control of the yellow crazy ant as its highest priority.

The park administration has a staff of 17, and operates out of an office in Drumsite on the northern side of the island.

== See also ==
- Protected areas managed by the Australian government
