= List of reptiles of Christmas Island =

This is a list of the reptile species recorded on Christmas Island. At the time of human settlement in the late 19th century, the island had five native species of lizard and one native snake. However, additional species were introduced during the 20th century, resulting in dramatic declines in the island's native reptile populations.

== Lizards ==
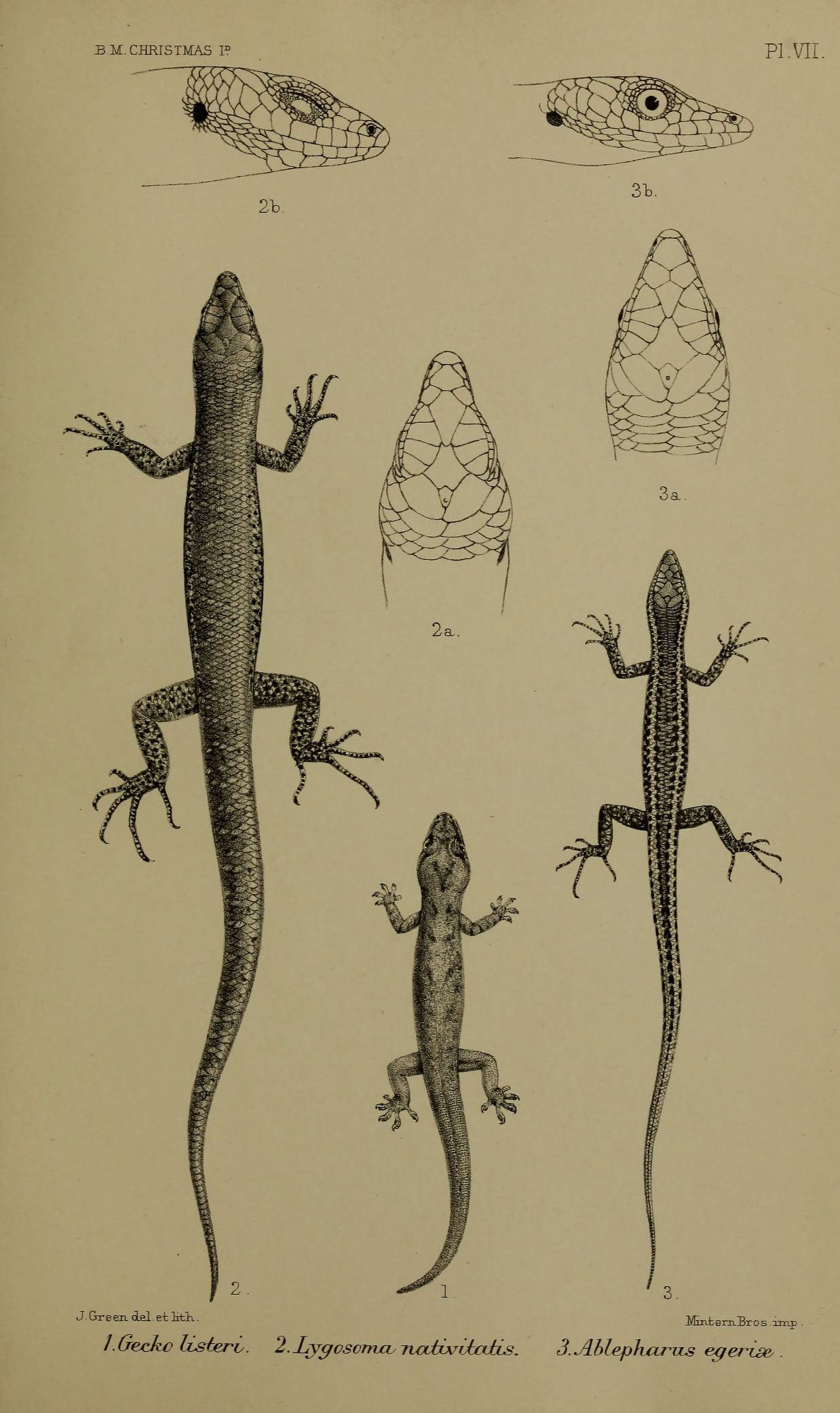
1900 monograph featuring three Christmas Island reptiles: (from left to right) Lister's gecko, Christmas Island forest skink, blue-tailed skink.

Christmas Island had five native lizard species at the time of human settlement, although the Christmas Island forest skink (Emoia nativitatis) is now considered extinct, and the blue-tailed skink (Cryptoblepharus egeriae) and Lister's gecko (Lepidodactylus listeri) are extinct in the wild. Three additional species were introduced during the 20th century.

Common name	Scientific name	Notes	Red List	Ref
Christmas Island blue-tailed shining-skink	Cryptoblepharus egeriae	endemic		
Christmas Island forest skink	Emoia nativitatis	endemic, last known individual died 31 May 2014		
Lister's gecko	Lepidodactylus listeri	endemic		
Sadleir's bow-fingered gecko	Cyrtodactylus sadleiri	endemic		
Coastal skink	Emoia atrocostata	native		
House gecko	Hemidactylus frenatus	introduced by 1940		
Stump-tailed gecko	Gehyra mutilata	introduced after the mid-1940s		
Grass skink	Lygosoma bowringii	introduced; first recorded around 1979		

== Snakes ==
Christmas Island has one endemic snake species, the Christmas Island blind snake (Ramphotyphlops exocoeti). The flowerpot blind snake (Ramphotyphlops braminus) had been introduced to the island by 1940, and the Oriental wolf snake (Lycodon capucinus) was introduced in the 1980s.

Common name	Scientific name	Notes	Red List	Ref
Christmas Island blind snake	Ramphotyphlops exocoeti	endemic		
Oriental wolf snake	Lycodon capucinus	introduced; first recorded around 1987		
Flowerpot blind snake	Ramphotyphlops braminus	introduced by 1940		

== Turtles ==
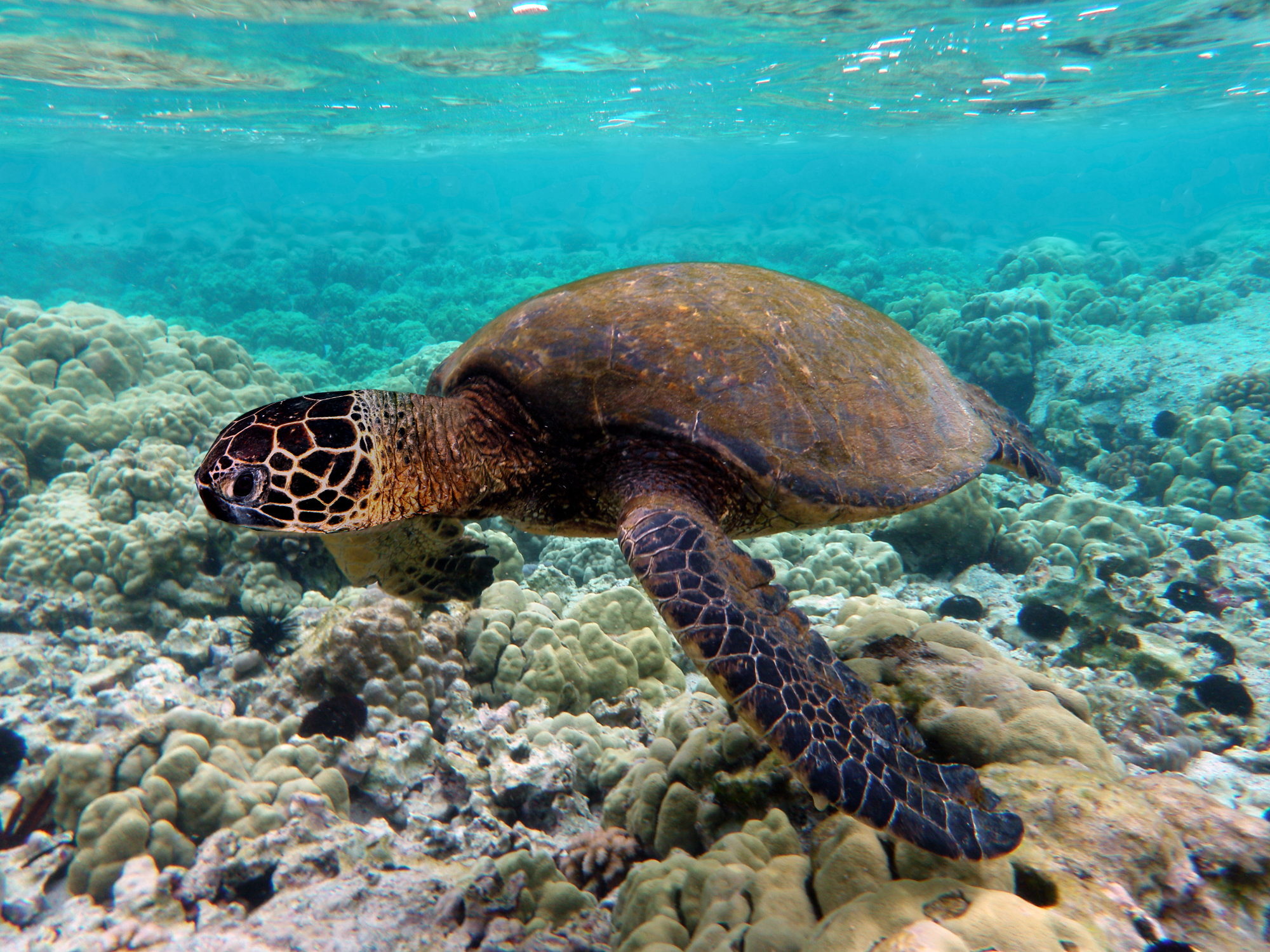
Green turtles are known to nest on Christmas Island.

Green turtles (Chelonia mydas) and, more rarely, hawksbill turtles (Eretmochelys imbricata) have been documented to nest on Christmas Island. Sea turtle nesting occurs on Dolly Beach, on a small area of sand above the high tide level, and occasionally at Greta Beach.

Common name	Scientific name	Notes	Red List	Ref
Green turtle	Chelonia mydas	nests on Christmas Island; considered uncommon		
Hawksbill turtle	Eretmochelys imbricata	nests on Christmas Island; rarely documented		
Loggerhead turtle	Caretta caretta	may forage in waters off Christmas Island		
Leatherback turtle	Dermochelys coriacea	may forage in waters off Christmas Island		

== See also ==
- List of birds of Christmas Island
- List of mammals of Christmas Island
