= Murray Hill, Christmas Island =

Mountain in Christmas Island

Murray Hill
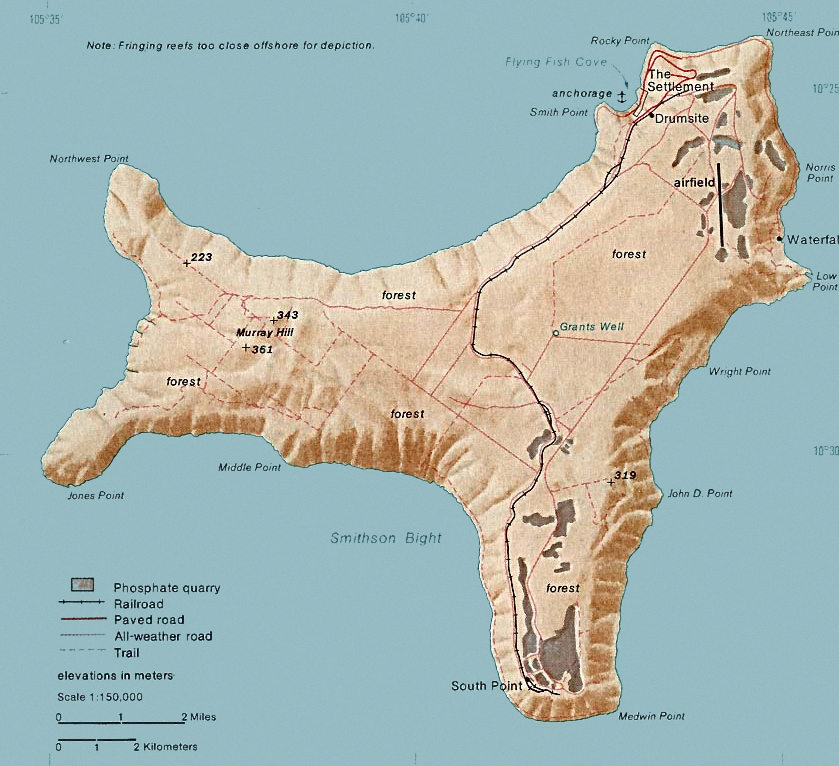
- Christmas Island; Murray Hill is in the western part

Highest point
- Elevation: 357 m (1,171 ft)
- Prominence: 357 m (1,171 ft)
- Coordinates: 10°29′0″S 105°34′51″E

Geography
- Location within Indonesia
- Location: Christmas Island

Murray Hill is the highest point of Christmas Island, at 357 metres (1,171 ft) above sea level. It was first scaled in 1887 even though the island had been located in 1615.

The plateau around the summit is dense and evergreen, although the biodiversity of trees is limited compared to similar areas of continental rainforest. Murray Hill is an integral part of the Christmas Island National Park covering an area of 85 square kilometres (33 sq mi) of the island's southwest corner; the island's total area is approximately 135 square kilometres (52 sq mi).

== History ==
Christmas Island was first discovered on in 1615 by Captain John Milward of the East India Company ship, and it was named Christmas Island on 25 December 1643. However, it was only 272 years later, in 1887, that detailed exploration of the topographical features and geological formations of the island was performed. This was an effort by a small group of people from HMS Egeria. They were the first to scale the highest mountain of the island, which is named as Murray Hill, though in earlier centuries some hills closer to the coast line and dense forest areas had been discovered. The detailed exploration also led to the finding of pure phosphate of lime which ensured the development of the island in the next century. Its control initially came under the British Dominion (from 1888), then as the British Colony of Singapore (after World War II), and finally as a sovereign part of Australia from 1 October 1958.

== Geography and geology ==
In the saddle-shaped Christmas Island, the Murray Hill rises to a height of 357 metres (1,171 ft). It is situated in the western central part of the island. It is 3.25 miles (5.23 km) to the southeast of Northwest Point where the Headridge Hill rises to a height of 335 metres (1,099 ft). West White Beach occurs on the southwest side of the hill. At 3.5 miles (5.6 km) in width, the most narrow point of Christmas Island is a line drawn north–south through Murray Hill.

The entire island including Murray Hill has been formed out of submarine mountain formations. It is conjectured to be an ancient atoll, with lime formation dominating the terrain, with phosphates of alumina and iron recorded on the hills. The entire island is geologically identified as an isolated limestone-capped volcanic island with hill formations rising to a height of 4.5 kilometres (2.8 mi) above the sea floor. Geological formations recorded are mainly-basaltic volcanic rocks interspersed with tertiary limestones and occasional inter-bedded volcanics overlaid by phosphate-rich soils on the surface in some areas. Along with the highest elevations of Phosphate Hill and Flying Fish Cove, the rocks from Murray Hill summit are characterized as dolomitic limestones, containing between 34 and 41 percent carbonate of magnesia. Analyses of the rocks has shown that the fossils are mostly obliterated, though there are remains of foraminifera, Lithothamnion, and possibly coral. The small, brown spherules of phosphatic matter which occur on the hill in a bed of rock may be explained because of phosphatic fossilization of volcanic rock. Murray Hill has an outcrop of many rocks subject to weathering. Recent ^{40}Ar/^{39}Ar geochronology study by Taneja et al. (2015) on the volcanic rocks from Christmas Island have shown that the experienced a renewed volcanism in the Eocene (43 - 37 Ma) and then a minor phase of volcanism in the Pliocene (4.2 Ma).

== Ecology ==
The plateau around the summit is dense and evergreen, although the biodiversity of trees is limited compared to similar areas of continental rainforest. One of the main fauna is the red land crab, Gecarcoidea natalis, which feeds on small seedlings. Vertebrates include geckos such as Cyrtodactylus and Lepidodactylus listeri, and skinks, specifically the Cryptoblepharus egeriae (Blue-tailed Skink), and Emoia nativitatis (Christmas Island forest skink); major invertebrates are also present, such as the robber crab, and the little nipper Geograpsus grayi.

Murray Hill is an integral part of a reserve area which covers the entire southwest corner of the island. Initially, it was declared as the Christmas Island National Park declared by Proclamation under the National Parks and Wildlife Conservation Act 1975, on 21 February 1980, covering an area of 85 km^{2} (out of total area of 135 km^{2} of the island). On 16 July 2000, the Environment Protection and Biodiversity Conservation Act 1999 came into effect and the park is now a Commonwealth Reserve under this Act. As of 2010, the national park makes up 63 percent of Christmas Island.
