= List of mammals of Christmas Island =

This is a list of the mammal species recorded on Christmas Island. The island had five native and endemic land mammal species, of which three are now presumed to be extinct. In addition, five wild mammals have been introduced to Christmas Island since settlement.

== Carnivora ==
Introduced cats and dogs are a threat to native wildlife on Christmas Island and can carry potentially dangerous pathogens, such as Leptospira. In 2014, the Australian Government announced a $500,000 investment to help eradicate stray and feral cats on the island, with the aim of complete eradication by 2020. As of 2016, all pet cats on Christmas Island have been registered and de-sexed and no further cats will be permitted onto the island.

Name	Species authority	Order	Family	Notes
Feral cat	Felis catus Linnaeus, 1758	Carnivora	Felidae	introduced
Feral dog	Canis lupus familiaris Linnaeus, 1758	Carnivora	Canidae	introduced

== Chiroptera ==
Christmas Island was once home to two native bat species, of which only one is extant. The Christmas Island pipistrelle was endemic to the island until 2009, when the last individual was recorded. In 2016, the species was assessed as extinct by the International Union for Conservation of Nature. The remaining native bat species Pteropus natalis (Christmas Island flying fox) is classified as critically endangered.

Name	Species authority	Order	Family	Notes	Red List
Christmas Island pipistrelle	Pipistrellus murrayi Andrews, 1900	Chiroptera	Vespertilionidae	endemic, extinct – last reported in 2009	
Christmas Island flying fox	Pteropus natalis Thomas, 1887	Chiroptera	Pteropodidae	endemic	

== Eulipotyphla ==
The Christmas Island shrew, once abundant on the island, has been very rare since the early twentieth century. Since 1909, only four confirmed individuals have been recorded: two in 1958, and two in 1985.

Name	Species authority	Order	Family	Notes	Red List
Christmas Island shrew	Crocidura trichura Dobson, 1889	Eulipotyphla	Soricidae	endemic – possibly extinct – last observed in 1985	

== Rodentia ==
At the time of human settlement, Christmas Island hosted two endemic rodents, the bulldog rat and Maclear's rat. However, both species were extinct by 1908. There is evidence that black rats, introduced to the island in 1899, carried the infectious parasite Trypanosoma lewisi, which was fatal to the native rodents.

Name	Species authority	Order	Family	Notes	Red List
House mouse	Mus musculus Linnaeus, 1758	Rodentia	Muridae	introduced	
Polynesian rat	Rattus exulans Peale, 1848	Rodentia	Muridae	introduced	
Maclear's rat	Rattus macleari Thomas, 1888	Rodentia	Muridae	endemic – extinct	
Bulldog rat	Rattus nativitatis Thomas, 1888	Rodentia	Muridae	endemic – extinct	
Black rat	Rattus rattus Linnaeus, 1758	Rodentia	Muridae	introduced in 1899	

== Cetacea ==
Name	Species authority	Order	Family	Notes	Red List
Humpback whale	Megaptera novaeangliae Gray, 1846	Cetacea	Balaenopteridae	native migrant	
Blue whale	Balaenoptera musculus Linnaeus, 1758	Cetacea	Balaenoptiidae	migrant	
Southern fin whale	Balaenoptera physalus quoyi Linnaeus, 1758	Cetacea	Balaenoptiidae	native migrant or resident	
Sei whale	Balaenoptera borealis schlegelii Linnaeus, 1758	Cetacea	Balaenoptiidae	native migrant	
Bryde's whale	Balaenoptera brydei Olsen, 1913	Cetacea	Balaenoptiidae	native migrant or resident	
Antarctic minke whale	Balaenoptera bonaerensis Linnaeus, 1758	Cetacea	Physeteridae	native migrant	
Sperm whale	Physeter macrocephalus Linnaeus, 1758	Cetacea	Physeteridae	native migrant or resident	
Short-finned pilot whale	Globicephala macrorhynchus Gray, 1846	Cetacea	Globicephala	native migrant or resident	
Killer whale	Orcinus orca Linnaeus, 1758	Cetacea	Delphinidae	native migrant or resident	
Spinner dolphin	Stenella longirostris Gray, 1828	Cetacea	Delphinidae	native migrant or resident	
Short-beaked common dolphin	Delphinus delphis Linnaeus, 1758	Cetacea	Delphinidae	native migrant or resident	
Common bottlenose dolphin	Tursiops truncatus Montagu, 1821	Cetacea	Delphinidae	possible migrant	

== Sirenia ==
Name	Species authority	Order	Family	Notes	Red List
Dugong	Dugong dugon Lacépède, 1799	Sirenia	Dugongidae	possible vagrant	

== See also ==
- List of birds of Christmas Island
- List of mammals of the Cocos (Keeling) Islands
