= Cyrtodactylus sadleiri =

Conservation status
- Endangered (IUCN 3.1)

Scientific classification
- Kingdom: Animalia
- Phylum: Chordata
- Class: Reptilia
- Order: Squamata
- Suborder: Gekkota
- Family: Gekkonidae
- Genus: Cyrtodactylus
- Species: C. sadleiri

Binomial name
- Cyrtodactylus sadleiri Wells & Wellington, 1985

Synonyms
- Cyrtodactylus sadleiri Wells & Wellington, 1985; Gonydactylus sadleiri — Kluge, 1991; Cyrtodactylus sadleiri — Cogger, 2000

Species of lizard

Cyrtodactylus sadleiri, also known commonly as Sadleir's bow-fingered gecko and the Christmas Island forest gecko, is a species of lizard in the family Gekkonidae. The species is endemic to Christmas Island, Australia.

== Etymology ==
The specific name, sadleiri, is in honour of "Dr. R. Sadleir". The species has the common names giant gecko, Christmas Island giant gecko, Sadleir's bow-fingered gecko, and Christmas Island forest gecko.

== Distribution and habitat ==
The preferred natural habitat of C. sadleiri is forest, at altitudes from sea level to 300 m (980 ft).

== Reproduction ==
Cyrtodactylus sadleiri is oviparous.

== Conservation ==
Cyrtodactylus sadleiri is considered to be endangered by the IUCN on the IUCN Red List. It is endemic to a single island where it is vulnerable to the threats posed by invasive species and habitat degradation. The populations of native reptiles on Christmas Island have declined precipitously since the introduction of the Asian wolf snake in the 1980s, and the consequent extinctions of several of these species may further increase pressure on Cyrtodactylus sadleiri as the snake has fewer other options for prey. The gecko also faces the threat of predation by several other invasives, such as the black rat, feral cats, yellow crazy ants, and the giant centipede Scolopendra subspinipes. The other major threat to the gecko is the degradation of its habitat by mining and deforestation. The combination of these threats means that the gecko, although still common across vegetated areas on the island, has probably suffered a significant decline in its population over the past three generations.

== See also ==
- List of reptiles of Christmas Island
