= Christmas Island shrew =

- A 1985 historical field sketch of the extinct Christmas Island shrew (Crocidura trichura)

Conservation status
- Extinct (1985) (IUCN 3.1)

Scientific classification
- Kingdom: Animalia
- Phylum: Chordata
- Class: Mammalia
- Order: Eulipotyphla
- Family: Soricidae
- Genus: Crocidura
- Species: †C. trichura

Binomial name
- †Crocidura trichura Dobson, 1889
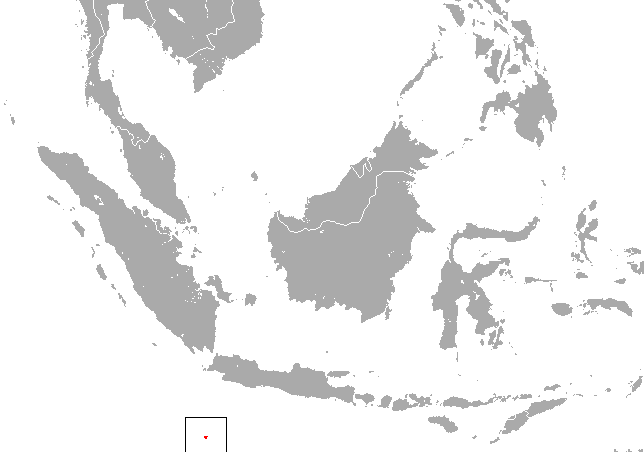
- Christmas Island shrew range

Synonyms
- Crocidura fuliginosa trichura Crocidura attenuata trichura

Species of mammal

The Christmas Island shrew (Crocidura trichura), also known as the Christmas Island musk-shrew, is an extinct species of shrew from Christmas Island. It was variously placed as subspecies of the Asian gray shrew (Crocidura attenuata) or the Southeast Asian shrew (Crocidura fuliginosa), but morphological differences and the great distances between the distribution of these species indicate that the Christmas Island shrew was a distinct species.

== Description ==
The Christmas Island shrew, like other members of the genus Crocidura, is a small short-legged mammal with a distinct pointed muzzle. It has a dark grey to reddish brown colouring. Like all other shrews, the Christmas Island shrew resembles a mouse, and weighs between 4.5–6 g (0.16–0.21 oz). The Christmas Island shrew varies from other forms of the species in that it is beset with long fine hairs, and its tail is much greater in length. The typical lifespan for its genus is approximately one year, but Crocidurine shrews have been reported to live for up to two years in the wild.

=== Habitat ===
The Christmas Island shrew was a terrestrial animal that occupied tall plateau rainforests with deep soil, as well as the shallow soil of terrace rainforests. It remains unknown if the species could live in secondary growth. This shrew fed primarily on small beetles and used holes in rocks and tree roots for shelter.

=== Status ===
The Australian Government adopted a recovery plan for the Christmas Island shrew consisting of two stages of objectives.

The most recent specimens of C. trichura were found in 1985, and a survey conducted fifteen years later failed to find any individuals. Its status was classified as extinct by the IUCN in 2025.

== Extinction ==
There is conclusive evidence that Crocidura trichura populations declined dramatically since 1900, yet the reason is unproven. After an unconfirmed sighting in 1958, it was rediscovered in 1985 when two specimens were caught. The two individuals later died. Several unconfirmed reports occurred between 1996 and 1998 but a survey undertaken in 2000 failed to find any individuals. The reasons for the population's reduction are unknown but potential threats included disease, habitat loss, habitat alteration due to invasive weeds, predation from species such as cats and black rats, small population size, and mortality from road traffic. Its disappearance in recent times might be caused by the accidentally introduced yellow crazy ant (Anoplolepis gracilipes), which is a dangerous threat for many terrestrial animals on Christmas Island. Crocidura trichura was declared extinct by the IUCN in 2025.

=== Trypanosoma disease ===
The theory of Durham (1908) and Pickering and Norris (1996) report that the decline of two endemic rats may be attributed to the infection of the Christmas Island shrew, according to local researchers. This forest dwelling mammal was at first thought to have vanished by 1908, probably due to a trypanosoma disease carried by introduced black rats, which is also considered a likely cause of the extinctions of Maclear's rat and the bulldog rat. The initial drop in C. trichura's population size occurred around the same time as the introduction of the Rattus rattus (the black rat), which carried a murid trypanosome. Evidence of the black rat and/or the parasite causing the Christmas Island shrew's population decline is not solid.

=== Gecarcoidea natalis ===
Another theory on the decline of Crocidura trichura is linked to the demise of the two endemic rats, and the competition left amongst the Christmas Island shrew and the Christmas Island red crab (Gecarcoidea natalis) for leaf litter resources. The decline of predator rat species allowed for the quickened rise of G. natalis, a usual prey of the rats. This could have forced C. trichura into new habitats such as tree canopies, or sites with low crab abundances. The population of C. trichura may have been pressured by their vulnerability during weaning.
