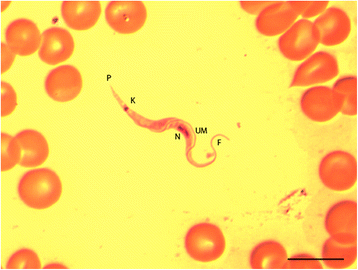

Scientific classification
- Domain: Eukaryota
- Clade: Discoba
- Phylum: Euglenozoa
- Class: Kinetoplastea
- Order: Trypanosomatida
- Family: Trypanosomatidae
- Genus: Trypanosoma
- Subgenus: Herpetosoma
- Species: T. lewisi

Binomial name
- Trypanosoma lewisi (Kent, 1880)

= Trypanosoma lewisi =

Species of parasitic protozoan

Trypanosoma lewisi is a globally distributed parasite of Rattus species and other rodents such as mice, and of kangaroo rats in America. Among these host species were two endemic species of rats: Rattus macleari and Rattus nativitatis. Both are now believed to be extinct. It is not very clear whether or not the same parasite infected both species. However, both parasites are very similar. The northern rat flea (Nosopsyllus fasciatus) acts as the vector for the parasite, harboring the epimastigote stage in its midgut. The trypomastigote is the stage that is present in the main host, the rodent. The epimastigote form attaches itself to the rectum of the insect using its flagella to burrow through the rectal walls. The parasites also appear in the flea's feces. Ingestion of either the flea or its feces during grooming infects the host rodent with the parasites. T. lewisi is normally non-pathogenic but is known to have produced fatal infections in rats.

== History ==
Trypanosomes in the blood of rats were first noted and described by Timothy Richards Lewis from Calcutta and the species was named after him. In the 1900s, a parasitologist noticed that Rattus macleari, a species of rat endemic to Christmas Island, were becoming sick. The suspected cause was a species of trypanosomes. There was no proof that this was actually correct until scientists from the American Museum of Natural History deposited some rats that had been collected from Christmas Island as specimens into museums. Scientists argue that Trypanosoma lewisi is partially or wholly responsible for the subsequent extinction of Rattus macleari. The parasites were transmitted from fleas infesting the then recently introduced black rats (Rattus rattus).

== Research ==
T. lewisi can be cultured in various media including in vivo in rat serum and in vitro in mammalian cell culture media. The parasite can also be grown in mice if the host is supplemented with a controlled diet and intraperitoneal injection of rat serum. Ablastin, an antibody that arises during an infection in the host's body, prevents the parasite from reproducing although they remain in adult form.

A research paper suggests that the data on the aftermath of introduction of a Trypanosoma lewisi to immunologically naïve murine hosts on Christmas Island around 1900 matches reports of complete extinction within the range of 1–9 years. This gives some more information on the first pathogen introduction to a species to have caused species extinction.

Although rare, there were also many cases in which human beings and primates were infected with Trypanosoma lewisi. In a recent study comparing Brazilian isolates in rats and primates, it was found the DNA sequences were the same when considering Trypanosoma lewisi. This further proves the potential of Trypanosoma lewisi's ability to infect human beings, despite being rare in most cases.

Life cycle of Trypanosoma lewisi

== Life cycle ==
A flea bites an infected rodent and ingests its blood. Within six hours, the parasites migrate and reproduce in the epithelial cells of their host flea's stomach. They then go further into the lumen of the stomach and finally move into the insect's rectum. The parasite's metacyclic trypomastigote infects a rat after it eats the host flea or the flea's feces. Once inside the rat's body, the parasite will then begin reproducing epimastigotes in the blood capillaries of the host. After about five days, trypanosomes will begin appearing in the peripheral blood of the host, with the appearance of thick worms. These parasites are usually attacked by ablastin, a trypanocidal IgG antibody produced by their host's immune system beginning 2–4 days postinfection. After a few weeks, the trypanosomes stop growing and disappear from the bloodstream. The rat then develops immunity against re-infection.
