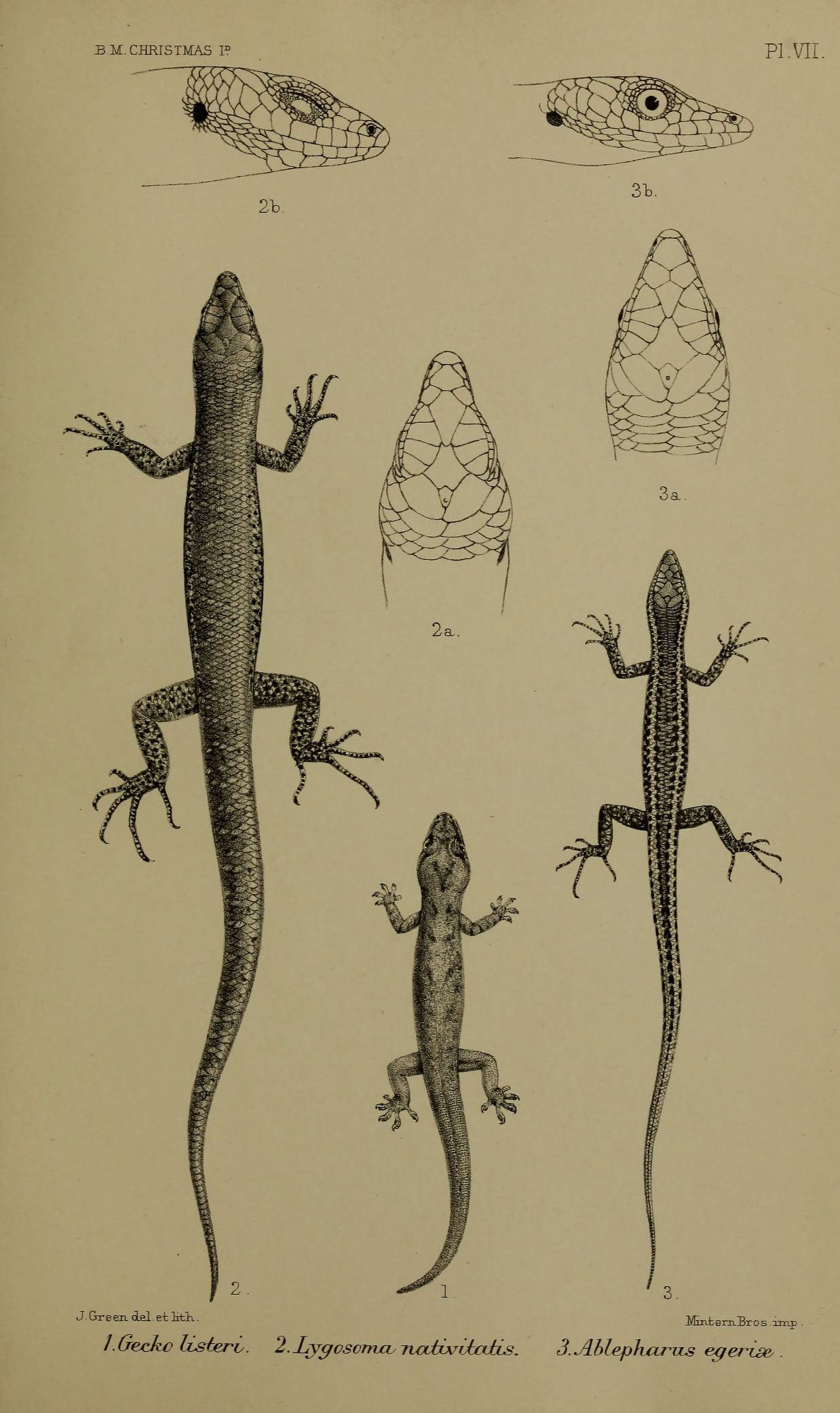
- 1900 monograph of three Christmas Island reptiles, with the forest skink in the centre

Conservation status
- Extinct (2017) (IUCN 3.1)

Scientific classification
- Kingdom: Animalia
- Phylum: Chordata
- Class: Reptilia
- Order: Squamata
- Family: Scincidae
- Genus: Emoia
- Species: †E. nativitatis

Binomial name
- †Emoia nativitatis (Boulenger, 1887)
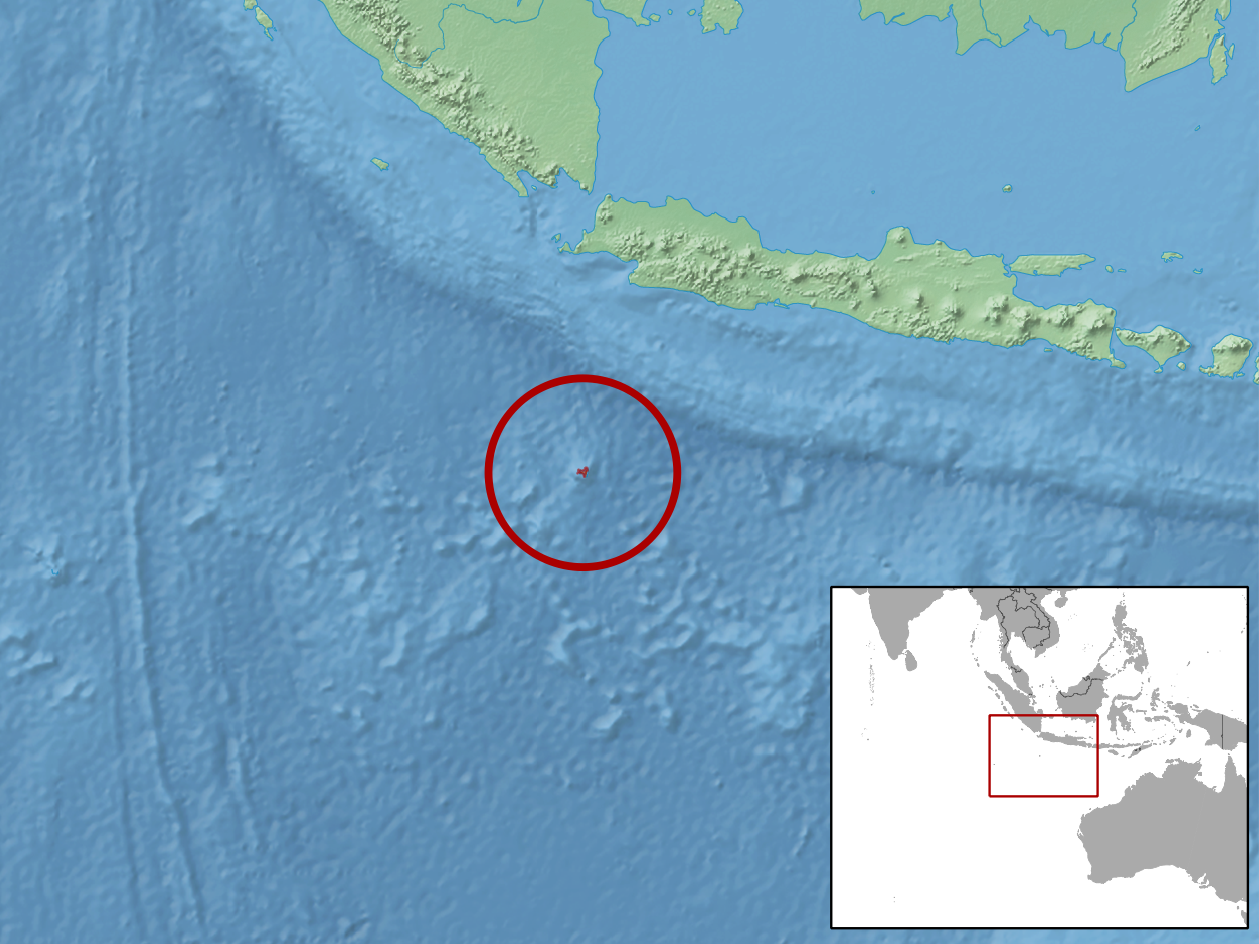

Synonyms
- Lygosoma nativitatis Boulenger, 1887

= Christmas Island forest skink =

Species of lizard

The Christmas Island forest skink (Emoia nativitatis), also known as the Christmas Island whiptail skink, is an extinct species of skink formerly endemic to Australia's Christmas Island. As of 2017, it is listed as extinct on the IUCN Red List. The last known forest skink, a captive individual named Gump, died on 31 May 2014.

== Description ==
The Emoia skinks are a large group with marked radiation on islands in the Pacific. The forest skink is about 20 cm long, thickset, ground-dwelling, and active during the day. Its body is a chocolate-brown colour and unpatterned. The species was found in forest clearings, usually in leaf litter.

== Discovery ==
The Christmas Island forest skink was described by George Albert Boulenger in 1887 based on a single tailless specimen. Subsequently, eight specimens were collected by naturalist Joseph Jackson Lister.

== Decline and extinction ==
The Christmas Island forest skink was common and widespread on Christmas Island during most of the twentieth century. It was considered abundant in 1979. As recently at 1998, herpetologist Hal Cogger observed more than 80 forest skinks basking and foraging around a single fallen tree. However, populations plummeted during the 1990s and 2000s by up to 98%. In 2003, the species was limited to fragmented pockets in remote parts of the island, and a targeted survey in 2008 found the species at only a single site.

The cause of the species' rapid decline is still unknown, although possibilities include predation by yellow crazy ants, giant centipedes, wolf snakes, and cats; competition with five introduced reptile species; poisoning from insecticides; and disease.

In the late 2000s, Christmas Island researchers tried to capture forest skinks for a captive breeding program, but only three females were ever found. On 3 January 2014, the species was added to the EPBC Act List of Threatened Fauna. The last surviving captive female was nicknamed Gump, and she died on 31 May 2014.

Following Gump's death, herpetologists John Woinarski and Hal Cogger wrote that: "For the Forest Skink, the trajectory of decline and the fruitlessness of dedicated searches provide reasonable grounds to presume extinction, although this conclusion may take some years to be officially recognised." If true, this would represent Australia's first reptile extinction since European colonisation. In 2017, the Christmas Island forest skink was listed as Extinct on the IUCN Red List.

== Evolutionary relationships ==
A 2018 genetic analysis found that it was most closely related within Emoia to Emoia boettgeri, native to Micronesia in the Pacific, over 4000 kilometers away, with an estimated divergence around 13 million years ago, during the Late Miocene. The clade containing these two taxa in turn formed a clade with the atrocostata group.

== See also ==
- List of reptiles of Christmas Island
