= List of mammals of the Cocos (Keeling) Islands =

This is a list of the mammal species recorded in the Cocos (Keeling) Islands, a small Indian Ocean archipelago approximately midway between Australia and Sri Lanka. There are two non-marine mammal species in the Cocos (Keeling) Islands, neither of which is believed to be threatened.

The following tags are used to highlight each species' conservation status as assessed by the International Union for Conservation of Nature:

EX	Extinct	No reasonable doubt that the last individual has died.
EW	Extinct in the wild	Known only to survive in captivity or as a naturalized populations well outside its previous range.
CR	Critically endangered	The species is in imminent risk of extinction in the wild.
EN	Endangered	The species is facing an extremely high risk of extinction in the wild.
VU	Vulnerable	The species is facing a high risk of extinction in the wild.
NT	Near threatened	The species does not meet any of the criteria that would categorise it as risking extinction but it is likely to do so in the future.
LC	Least concern	There are no current identifiable risks to the species.
DD	Data deficient	There is inadequate information to make an assessment of the risks to this species.

Some species were assessed using an earlier set of criteria. Species assessed using this system have the following instead of near threatened and least concern categories:

LR/cd	Lower risk/conservation dependent	Species which were the focus of conservation programmes and may have moved into a higher risk category if that programme was discontinued.
LR/nt	Lower risk/near threatened	Species which are close to being classified as vulnerable but are not the subject of conservation programmes.
LR/lc	Lower risk/least concern	Species for which there are no identifiable risks.

== Order: Chiroptera (bats) ==
The bats' most distinguishing feature is that their forelimbs are developed as wings, making them the only mammals capable of flight. Bat species account for about 20% of all mammals.

- Family: Molossidae
  - Genus: Chaerephon
    - Wrinkle-lipped free-tailed bat, Chaerephon plicata LC
- Family: Vespertilionidae
  - Subfamily: Vespertilioninae
    - Genus: Pipistrellus
      - Least pipistrelle, Pipistrellus tenuis LR/lc

== Order: Cetacea (whales and dolphins and porpoises) ==
The order Cetacea includes whales, dolphins and porpoises. They are the mammals most fully adapted to aquatic life with a spindle-shaped nearly hairless body, protected by a thick layer of blubber, and forelimbs and tail modified to provide propulsion underwater.

- Suborder: Mysticeti
  - Family: Balaenopteridae
    - Subfamily: Balaenopterinae
      - Genus: Balaenoptera
        - Omura's whale, Balaenoptera omurai (possible)DD
- Suborder: Odontoceti
  - Superfamily: Platanistoidea
    - Family: Ziphidae
      - Subfamily: Hyperoodontinae
        - Genus: Mesoplodon
          - Blainville's beaked whale, Mesoplodon densirostris DD
    - Family: Delphinidae (marine dolphins)
      - Genus: Feresa
        - Pygmy killer whale, Feresa attenuata DD

== Order: Sirenia (sea cows) ==
The dugong is not a native species to the Cocos (Keeling) Islands, however, a solitary animal started to inhabit the southern lagoon in 2002.

- Family: Dugongidae
  - Subfamily: Dugonginae
    - Genus: Dugong
      - Dugong, D. dugon VU

== See also ==
- Fauna of the Cocos (Keeling) Islands
- List of mammals of Christmas Island
- List of chordate orders
- Lists of mammals by region
- List of prehistoric mammals
- Mammal classification
- List of mammals described in the 2000s
