= Encephalartos brevifoliolatus =

Conservation status
- Extinct in the Wild (IUCN 3.1)
- CITES Appendix I

Scientific classification
- Kingdom: Plantae
- Clade: Tracheophytes
- Clade: Gymnospermae
- Division: Cycadophyta
- Class: Cycadopsida
- Order: Cycadales
- Family: Zamiaceae
- Genus: Encephalartos
- Species: E. brevifoliolatus

Binomial name
- Encephalartos brevifoliolatus Vorster

Species of cycad

Encephalartos brevifoliolatus, the escarpment cycad, is a cycad in the African genus Encephalartos. It is extinct in the wild. The escarpment cycad was found in short grasslands in the very open Protea savanna on the northern Drakensberg escarpment in South Africa's Limpopo Province.

== Description ==
This plant grows as a dioecious small tree with a single, unbranched stem that often produces suckers at the base, forming clumps of up to 6 stems. The stem is erect, but may lean or hang down from cliffs, reaching heights of up to 2.5 meters and thicknesses of 250–300 millimeters. It is covered by small remains of leaf bases that are often charred from fires in its grassland habitat. Its crown is felt-like, but the initial coverings of the leaf bases are thin, and whitish. The leaves are 800–900 millimeters long, rigid, straight, or slightly curved near the tips. The leaf stalks are somewhat cylindrical, initially covered in a whitish felt-like covering becoming smooth as they mature, yellowish, 90–200 x 7–10 millimeters. The rachis is yellowish, and the basal leaflets are slightly reduced in size. The median leaflets overlap somewhat, spaced 8–10 millimeters apart, pointing toward the leaf's tip at a 45° angle. Opposing leaflets are set at a 135° angle to each other, dark green, narrowly ovate, with pointed tips. On the underside they have fine ribs with 12–16 veins, 60–80 millimeters long and 10–12 millimeters wide.

It is a species of which only male specimens have been described in nature. There are up to 6 male cones per stem that are sessile, very narrowly egg-shaped, pedunculated, coarsely cylindrical, about 30 cm long and 6–7 cm in diameter. The central facet is rhombic, smooth, 7–9 millimeters wide, and 3–5 millimeters high.
