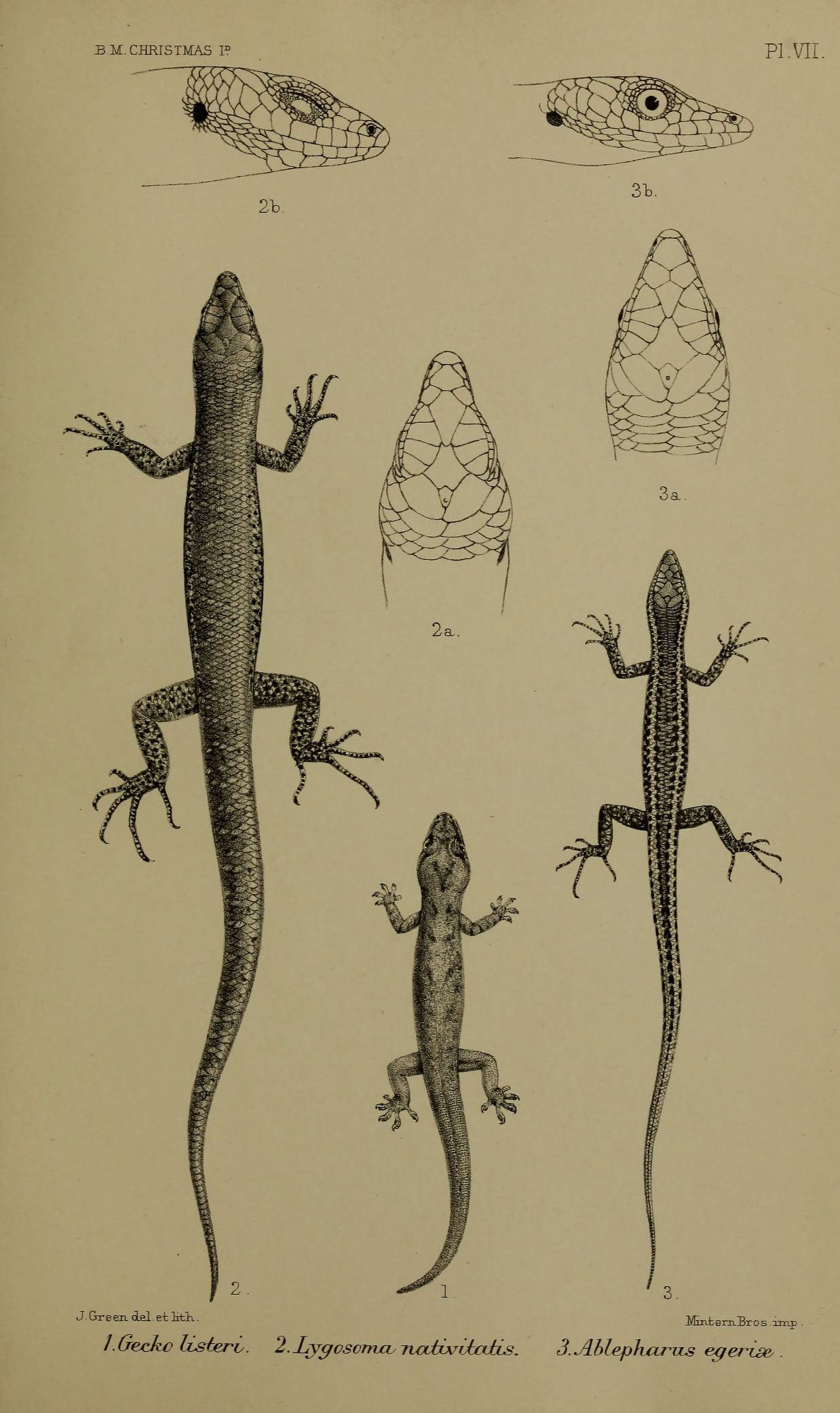
- 1900 monograph of three Christmas Island reptiles, with the Christmas Island blue-tailed shinning-skink at right.

Conservation status
- Extinct in the Wild (IUCN 3.1)

Scientific classification
- Kingdom: Animalia
- Phylum: Chordata
- Order: Squamata
- Family: Scincidae
- Genus: Cryptoblepharus
- Species: C. egeriae

Binomial name
- Cryptoblepharus egeriae (Boulenger, 1888)

Synonyms
- Ablepharus egeriae Boulenger, 1888; Ablepharus boutonii egeriae — Mertens, 1931; Cryptoblepharus egeriae — Greer, 1974

= Cryptoblepharus egeriae =

Christmas Island blue-tailed shining-skink

Species of reptile

Cryptoblepharus egeriae, also known commonly as the blue-tailed shinning-skink, the Christmas Island blue-tailed shinning-skink, and the Christmas Island blue-tailed skink, is a species of lizard in the family Scincidae that was once endemic to Christmas Island. The Christmas Island blue-tailed skink was discovered in 1888. It was formerly the most abundant reptile on the island, and occurred in high numbers particularly near the human settlement. However, the Christmas Island blue-tailed skink began to decline sharply outwardly from the human settlement by the early 1990s, which coincided with the introduction of a predatory snake and also followed the introduction of the yellow crazy ant (Anoplolepis gracilipes) in the mid-1980s. By 2006, the Christmas Island blue-tailed skink was on the endangered animals list, and by 2010 the Christmas Island blue-tailed skink was extinct in the wild. From 2009 to 2010, Parks Australia and Taronga Zoo started a captive breeding program, which has prevented total extinction of the species.

== Etymology ==
The specific name, egeriae, is in honor of HMS Egeria.

== Description ==
The Christmas Island blue-tailed skink typically grows to a snout-to-vent length (SVL) of 4–5 cm (1.6–2.0 in). It can be identified by its small black body with two yellow stripes running down the skink's back and onto its vibrant blue tail. The skink can use its blue tail to draw a predator's attention away from its body by separating its tail from its body. The bright color of the skink's tail means predators are much more likely to notice the tail than the skink's black body.

== Diet ==
The Christmas Island blue-tailed skink is a forager known as an insectivore. Its diet primarily consists of crickets, beetles, flies, grasshoppers, spiders, and earthworms. It will occasionally eat some vegetation, though insects remain its primary source of food. Because of its small size, the Christmas Island blue-tailed skink forages for its food on the ground, over exposed rocks and low-lying vegetation, and will generally only eat prey that are slower moving.

== Reproduction ==
For the Christmas Island blue-tailed skink, the first breeding season occurs when males and females are approximately one year old. The Christmas Island blue-tailed skink typically lives for seven years in the wild, six of which are active breeding years. The male Christmas Island blue-tailed skink will demonstrate courtship behaviour when trying to find a mate. The female Christmas Island blue-tailed skink will emit biochemicals for the males to smell, letting them know that the female is in her fertile stage of reproduction. Male Christmas Island blue-tailed skinks will often fight each other to win a female mate during breeding season. These skinks are polygamous which increases their chance of having offspring. Once the female Christmas Island blue-tailed skink has been fertilized, being oviparous, it will generally lay two eggs at a time, with a 75-day incubation period.

== Distribution ==
Until the late 1990s, the Christmas Island blue-tailed skink was endemic to Christmas Island and could be found all over the island. It currently exists in captive populations on Christmas Island, at Taronga Zoo, and on a small island (Pulu Blan) in the Cocos (Keeling) Islands where it has been released as part of an assisted colonization trial.

== Conservation efforts ==
The threat of extinction is largely attributed to introductions of invasive species, including a predatory wolf snake and the yellow crazy ant which were unintentionally brought to the island in the 1980s. The Christmas Island blue-tailed skink is now extinct in the wild. However, Taronga Zoo currently has an active breeding program hosted by Taronga Conservation Society, which originated from 66 skinks that were brought into captivity before their population was wiped out. The breeding program has been running for over a decade, with the goal of releasing some of the skinks back into their native habitat. Since the Taronga Conservation Society conservation efforts began, 300 skinks have been introduced to the Cocos Islands.

The genome of the blue-tailed skink (along with the Lister's gecko) was sequenced in 2022, marking the first high quality skink reference genome. Analysis of this genome revealed high genetic diversity, reflective of large historical population sizes. However, regions of the genome also showed signs of recent inbreeding, likely because skinks used to found the captive population were somewhat related.

== Evolutionary relationships ==
C. egeriae is most closely related to the metallicus group of Cryptoblepharus, native to Australia, with the estimated divergence of C. egeriae from the group taking place around seven million years ago. It has an XY sex determination system, which is likely shared across all major skink lineages.

== See also ==
- List of reptiles of Christmas Island
