= Extinct in the wild =

IUCN conservation category

A species that is extinct in the wild (EW) is one that has been categorized by the International Union for Conservation of Nature as only consisting of living members kept in captivity or as a naturalized population outside its historic range. Classification requires exhaustive surveys conducted within the species' known habitat with consideration given to seasonality, time of day, and life cycle. Once a species is classified as EW, the only way for it to be downgraded is through reintroduction.

Not all EW species are rare. An example is the Brugmansia genus, where all seven species are widely cultivated, but none are found in the wild.

== Examples ==
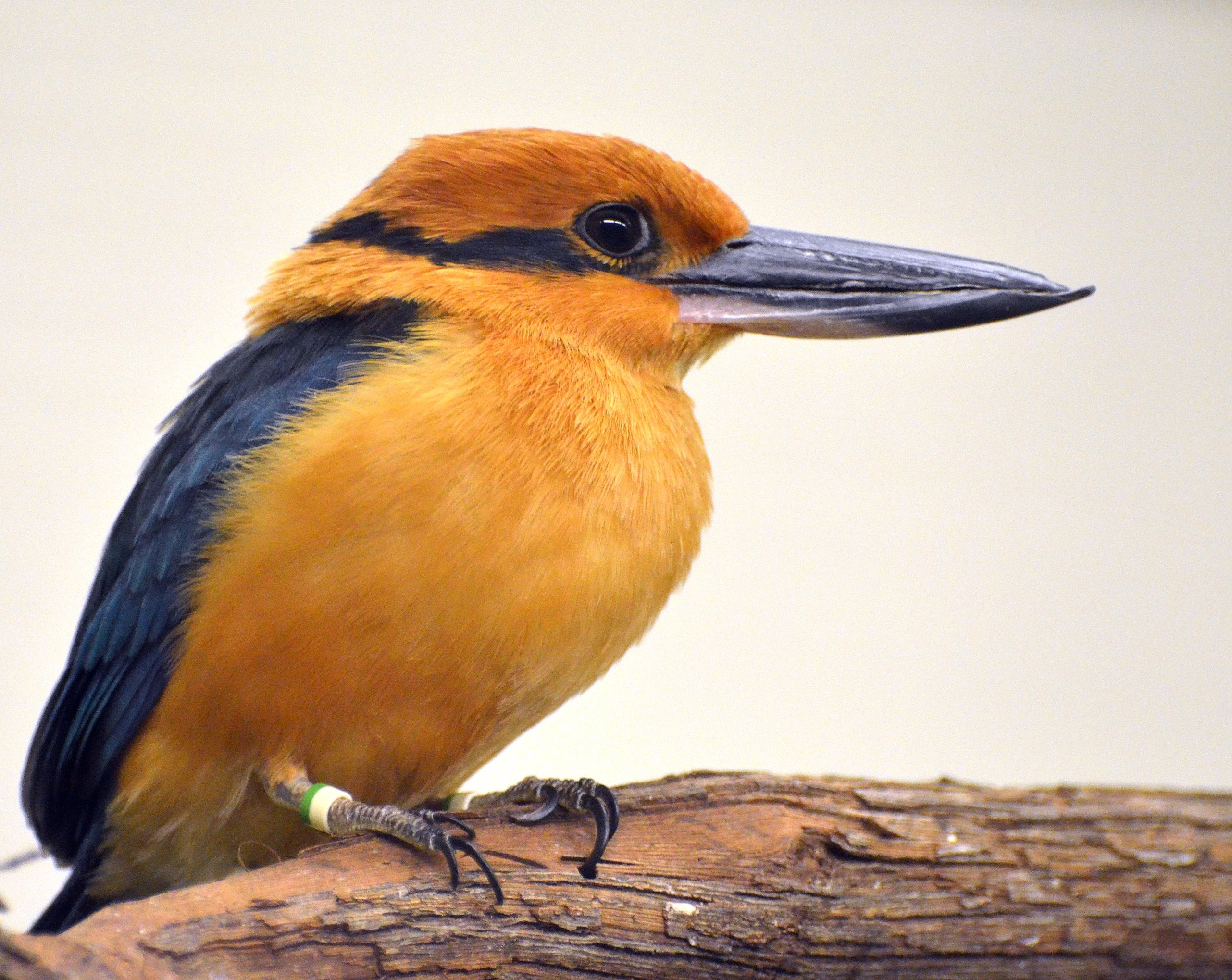
The Guam kingfisher has been listed as extinct in the wild since 1986.

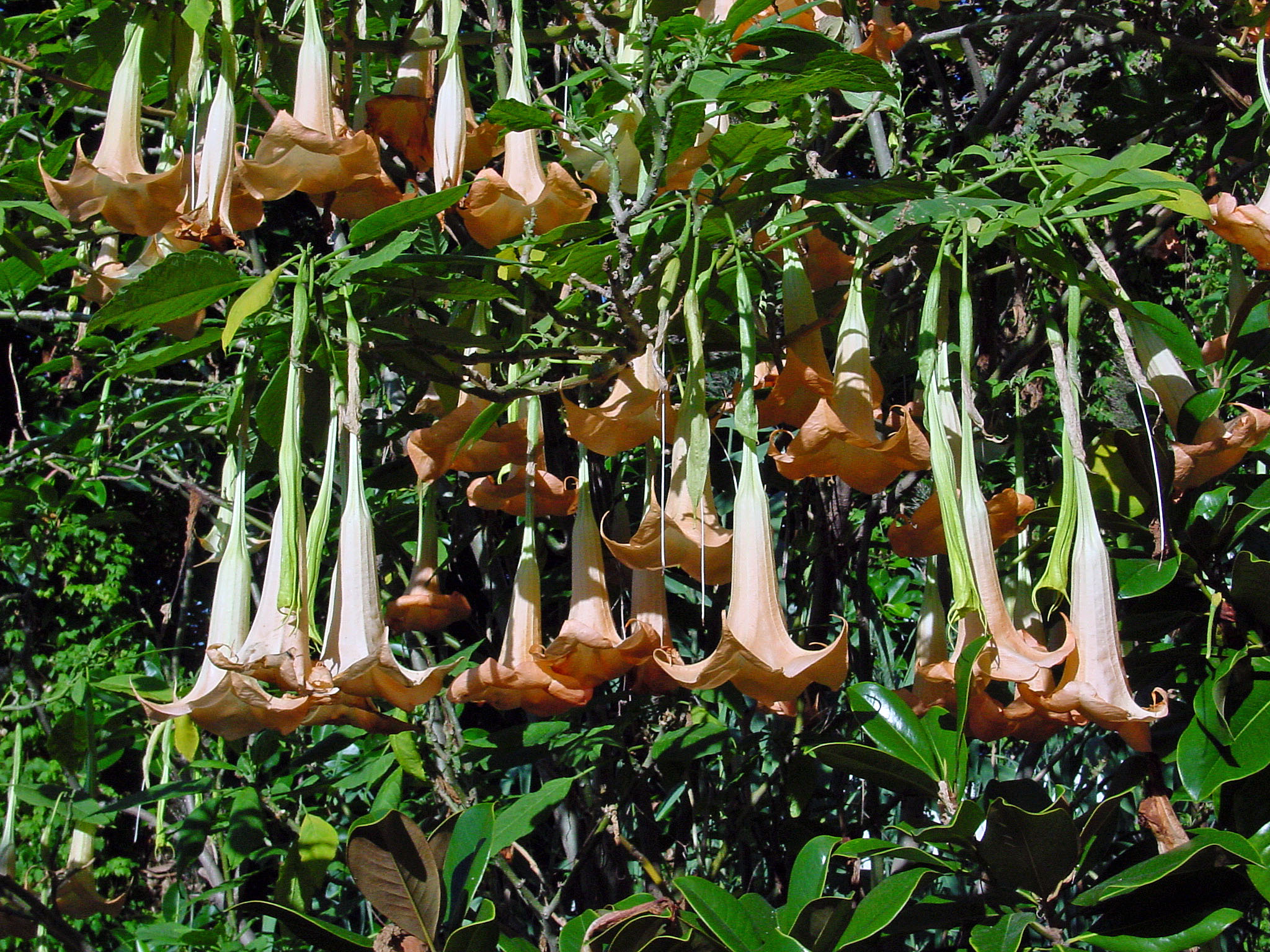
Brugmansia versicolor (angel's trumpet) has been listed as extinct in the wild since 2014.

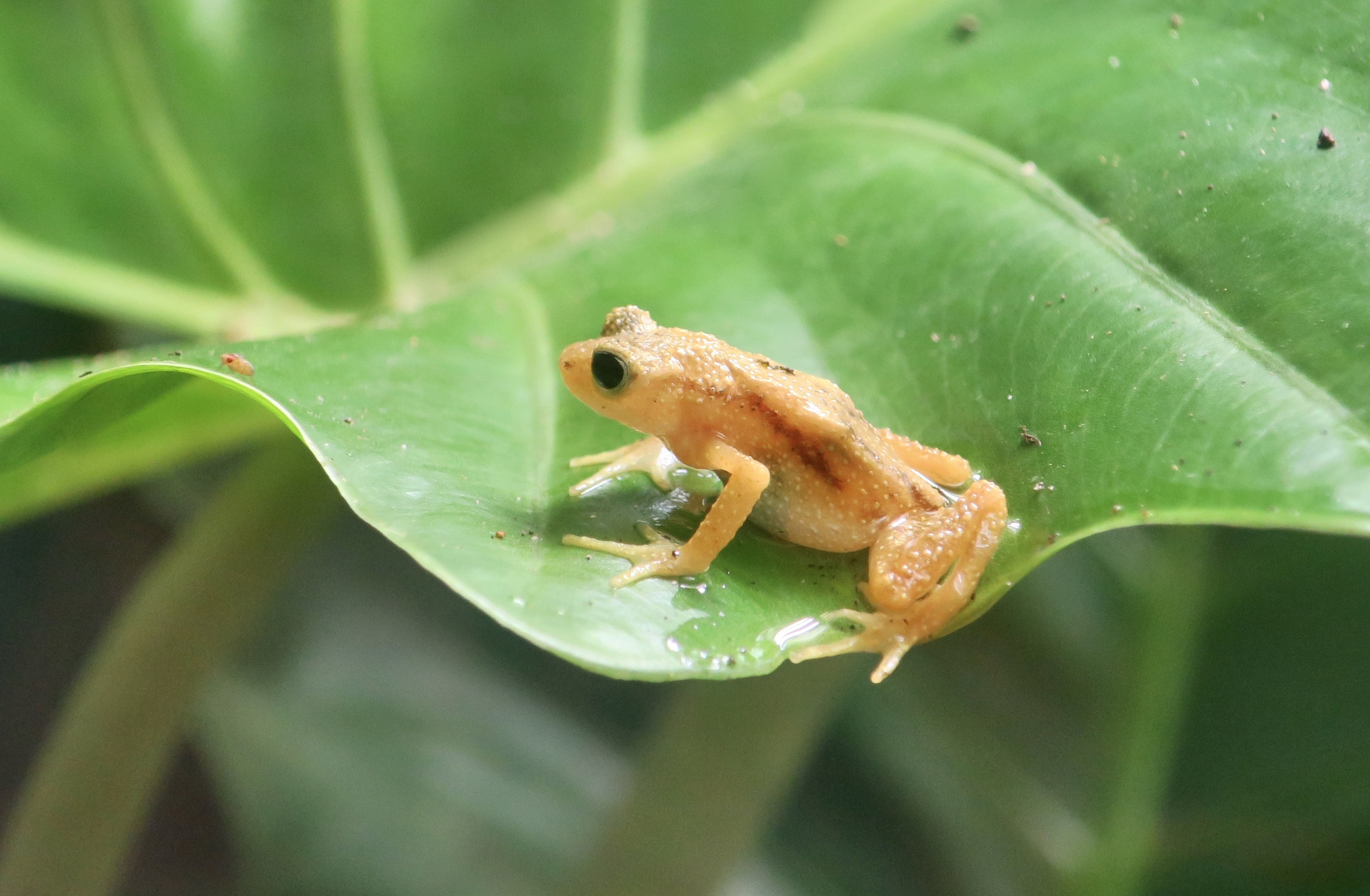
The Kihansi spray toad has been listed as extinct in the wild since 2014.

Examples of species and subspecies that are extinct in the wild include (in alphabetical order):

- Abutilon pitcairnense (last surviving plant destroyed in 2005)
- Alagoas curassow (last unconfirmed sighting reported in the late 1980s, listed extinct in the wild since 1994)
- Corypha taliera (last tree cut down in 1979)
- Christmas Island blue-tailed skink (listed extinct in the wild since 2014)
- Dabry's sturgeon (listed extinct in the wild since 2022)
- Escarpment cycad (listed extinct in the wild since 2006)
- Franklinia alatamaha (last seen in 1803, listed extinct in the wild since 1998)
- Golden skiffia (listed extinct in the wild since 1996)
- Guam kingfisher (listed extinct in the wild since 1986)
- Hawaiian crow or ʻalalā (last seen in 2002, listed as extinct in the wild since 2004) Small groups have since been released in 2017 and 2018.
- Kihansi spray toad (listed extinct in the wild since 2009)
- La Palma pupfish (last seen in 1994, listed extinct in the wild since 1996)
- Lister's gecko (listed extinct in the wild since 2014)
- Oahu deceptor bush cricket (listed extinct in the wild since 1996)
- Panamanian golden frog (possibly extinct in the wild)
- Père David's deer (listed extinct in the wild since 2008. However, reintroduction from captive populations began in 1985, with 53 wild herds of varying sizes being recorded in 2003)
- Partula species (listed extinct in the wild in the 1990s):
  - Niho tree snail
  - Miracle Partula
  - Moorean Smooth Partula
  - Sutural Partula
  - Rose-tipped Partula
  - Garrett's Partula
  - Raiatea ground Partula
  - Pink Partula
  - Variable Partula
- Simandoa conserfariam
- Socorro dove (listed extinct in the wild since 1994)
- Socorro isopod (last seen in 1988, listed as extinct in the wild since August 1996)
- South China tiger (since 2008 IUCN Red List lists as critically endangered; possibly extinct in the wild)
- Spix's macaw (listed extinct in the wild since June 2019)
- Wyoming toad (listed extinct in the wild since 1991, although 853 have been released into the wild since 1995, leading to a population of around 1,500 in 2017)

== Conservation ==
=== Species reintroduction ===
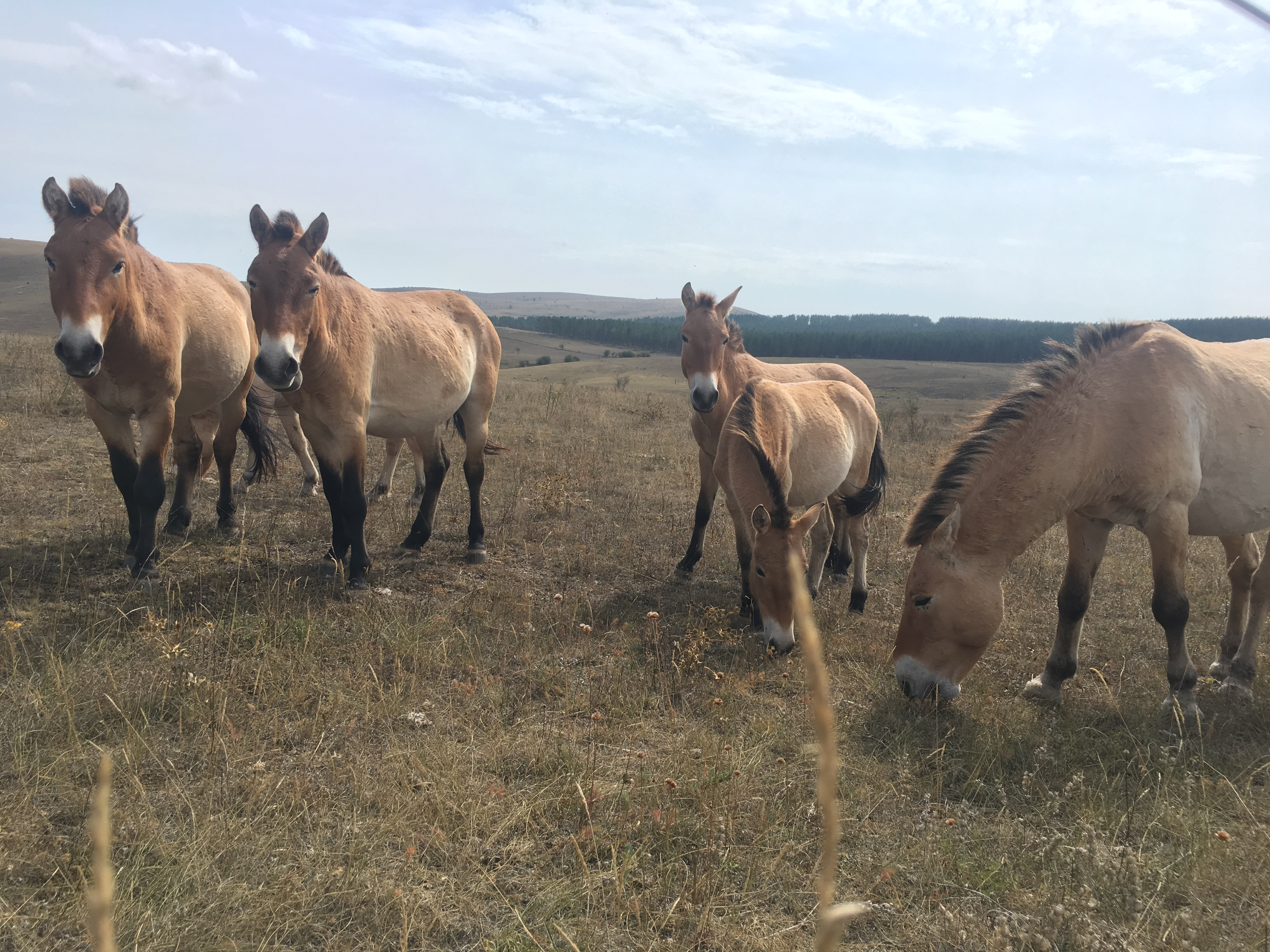
Przewalski's horse has been reintroduced, its status going from extinct in the wild to endangered.

Reintroduction is the deliberate release of individuals into the wild, from captivity or from other areas where the species survives. However, it may be difficult to reintroduce EW species into the wild, even if their natural habitats were restored, because survival techniques, which are often passed from parents to offspring during parenting, may have been lost. Reintroduction efforts, also referred to as translocation, are complex and a common source of complication is how animals behave upon release. Climate suitability has been shown to influence reintroduction outcomes as well. Though many efforts translocate populations to historic ranges, climate change may be causing those previously inhabited areas to no longer be suitable for the species. The Przewalski's horse was downgraded from EW to Endangered in 2011 after decades of reintroduction efforts. In China, they are still classified as EW since they are given supplemental feed over the winter to aid survival. Of the 2500 living, about 1360 are in the wild, and all 2500 are descended from 12 wild-caught ancestors, causing an inbreeding depression that contributes to factors, such as shorter lifespans and high mortality, that impede conservation.

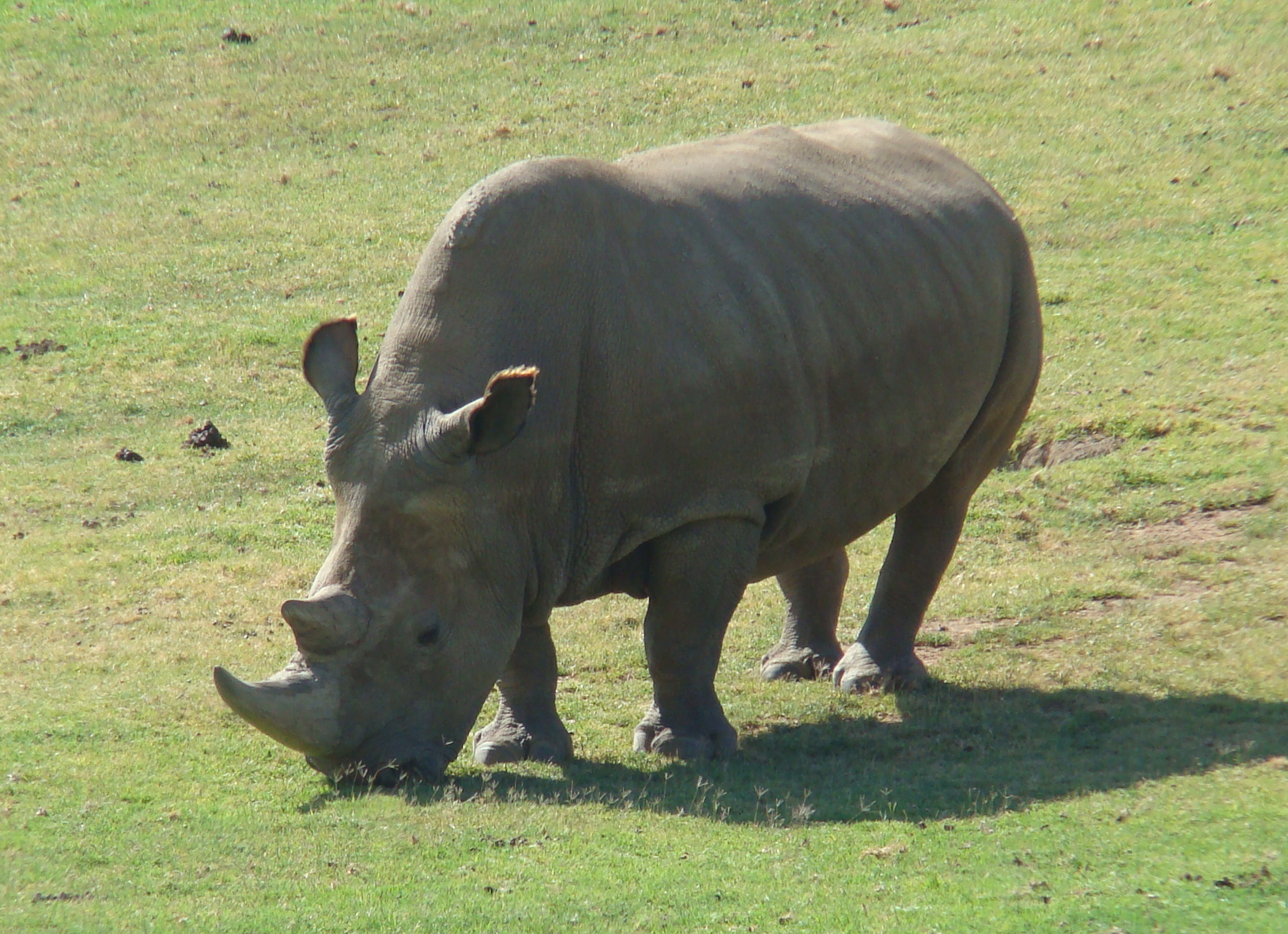
A northern white rhino, a possibly extinct in the wild species

Northern white rhinos have been extinct in the wild since 2007, and only two females remain in captivity. The San Diego Zoo Global is planning to save the species by using living cells from 12 rhinos that have been cryopreserved, turning them into stem cell lines, using in vitro fertilization to create embryos, and then having Southern white rhinos serve as surrogates. Currently, there have been no successful embryo transfers in rhinos. It is estimated to take at least 40 years for the target of 25–40 northern white rhinos to be reached.

Some people critique efforts to save species with such small populations due to the possibility of inbreeding as it can reduce the population growth rate. Small effective population sizes are another critique. Effective population size is a measurement of the loss of genetic diversity. Multiple populations have been found to have an effective population size below conservation goals. Additionally, monitoring effective population size and using it to aid estimations of the success of conservation efforts has been shown to provide a better overview of determining population trends when compared to population size.

=== IUCN Green Status of Species ===
The IUCN developed a system of classifying species recovery efforts in 2012 entitled the Green Status. The species recovery score is a 0%–100% scale, with 0% being the species is extinct or extinct in the wild and 100% being fully recovered. In addition, the Green Status also classifies previous and future conservation impacts with the Green Scores of Conservation Dependency, Conservation Gain, Conservation Legacy, and Recovery Potential.

For a species to receive a score of 100% and be considered fully recovered, three requirements must be met: the species must be present in all areas of both its current and historical range, it is viable in all areas of the range, and performs its ecological niche across the full range. Given the lofty standards, many species are not expected to meet the criteria and it is not a goal of this system. Land use changes have cumulated in many species losing habitat.

Green Scores are snapshots in time to assess a species' current status and how conservation efforts have influenced their status. It is also predictive as it can project how the status would change if conservation efforts ceased or continued. Conservation Legacy assess how previous conservation work has changed or maintained a species' status. The score ranges from high to low with low meaning conservation efforts were ineffective or did not occur. Conservation Dependency is the estimate of a species' status in 10 years if conservation efforts halted. High dependency means the species would have a lower status and low dependency equates to the status not changing. Conservation Gain is the flip side. It projects a species' status in 10 years if conservation efforts continue. Both dependence and gain are considered short-term measures. The long-term measure is Recovery Potential, which is how much of the range is estimated to be able to house ecologically functional populations.

=== Flagship species ===
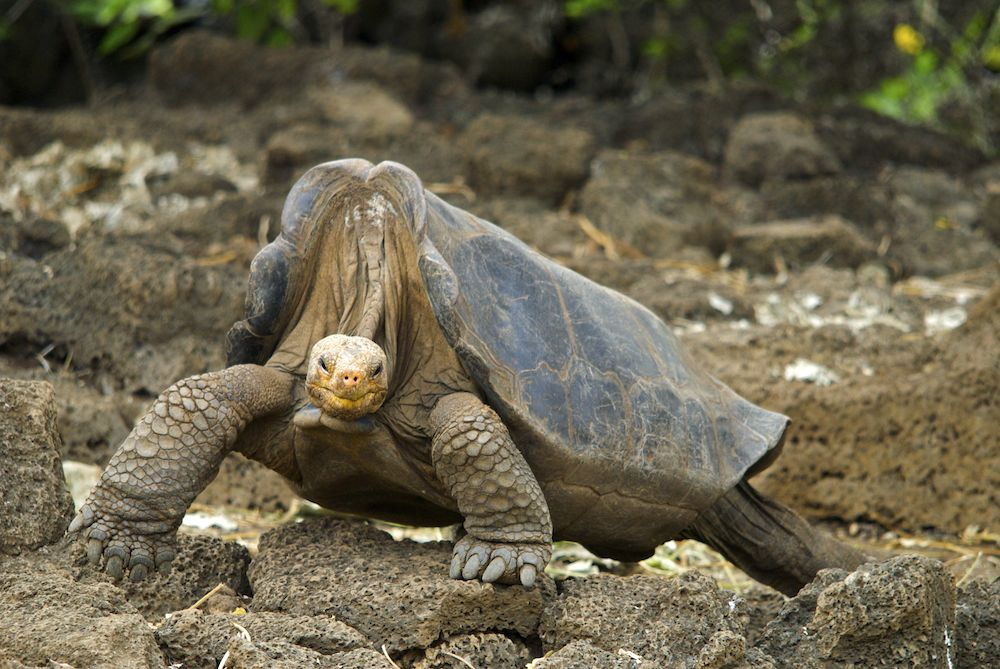
Lonesome George, the last known Pinta Island tortoise, died in 2012.

The Pinta Island tortoise (Geochelone nigra abingdoni) had only one living individual, named Lonesome George, until his death in June 2012. The tortoise was believed to be extinct in the mid-20th century, until Hungarian malacologist József Vágvölgyi spotted Lonesome George on the Galapagos island of Pinta on 1 December 1971. Since then, Lonesome George has been a powerful symbol for conservation efforts in general and for the Galapagos Islands in particular. With his death on 24 June 2012, the subspecies is again believed to be extinct. With the discovery of 17 hybrid Pinta tortoises located at nearby Wolf Volcano, a plan has been made to attempt to breed the subspecies back into a pure state.

== See also ==
- IUCN Red List extinct in the wild species for a list by taxonomy
- Category:IUCN Red List extinct in the wild species for an alphabetical list
- Ex situ conservation
- Extinction
- Ecological extinction
- Lists of extinct species
- Local extinction
- Nature conservation
- Wildlife conservation
