= Christmas Island blind snake =

Conservation status
- Endangered (IUCN 3.1)

Scientific classification
- Kingdom: Animalia
- Phylum: Chordata
- Class: Reptilia
- Order: Squamata
- Suborder: Serpentes
- Family: Typhlopidae
- Genus: Ramphotyphlops
- Species: R. exocoeti

Binomial name
- Ramphotyphlops exocoeti (Boulenger, 1887)

Synonyms
- Typhlops exocoeti Boulenger In Günther, 1887; Typhlops exocoeti — Boulenger, 1893; Typhlops capensis Rendahl, 1918; Typhlops exocoeti — Hahn, 1980; Ramphotyphlops exocoeti — Cogger, Sadlier & Cameron, 1983

Species of snake

The Christmas Island blind snake (Ramphotyphlops exocoeti) is a species of snake in the family Typhlopidae. The species is endemic to Christmas Island. There are no subspecies that are recognized as being valid.

== Etymology ==
The specific name, exocoeti, which means "flying fish", is in honor of the officers of HMS Flying Fish, who collected the holotype.

== Geographic range ==
R. exocoeti is only found on Christmas Island (Australia). The type locality given is "Christmas Island, Indian Ocean".

== Habitat ==
The preferred natural habitat of R. exocoeti is forest, at altitudes from sea level to 300 m (980 ft).

== Description ==
R. exocoeti may attain a total length of 35 cm (14 in), which includes a tail 8 cm (3.1 in) long.

== Behavior ==
R. exocoeti is terrestrial and fossorial.

== Reproduction ==
R. exocoeti is oviparous.

== Conservation status ==
The species R. exocoeti is classified as Endangered (EN) on the IUCN Red List with the following criteria: D2 (v2.3, 1994). This means that it is not Critically Endangered, but is facing a high risk of extinction in the wild in the medium-term future. This is because the population is very small and characterized by an acute restriction in its area of occupancy. It is therefore prone to the effects of human activities (or stochastic events, the impact of which is increased by human activities) within a very short period of time in an unforeseeable future. Therefore, it is possible that this species may become Critically Endangered or even Extinct within a very short period of time.

== See also ==
- List of reptiles of Christmas Island
