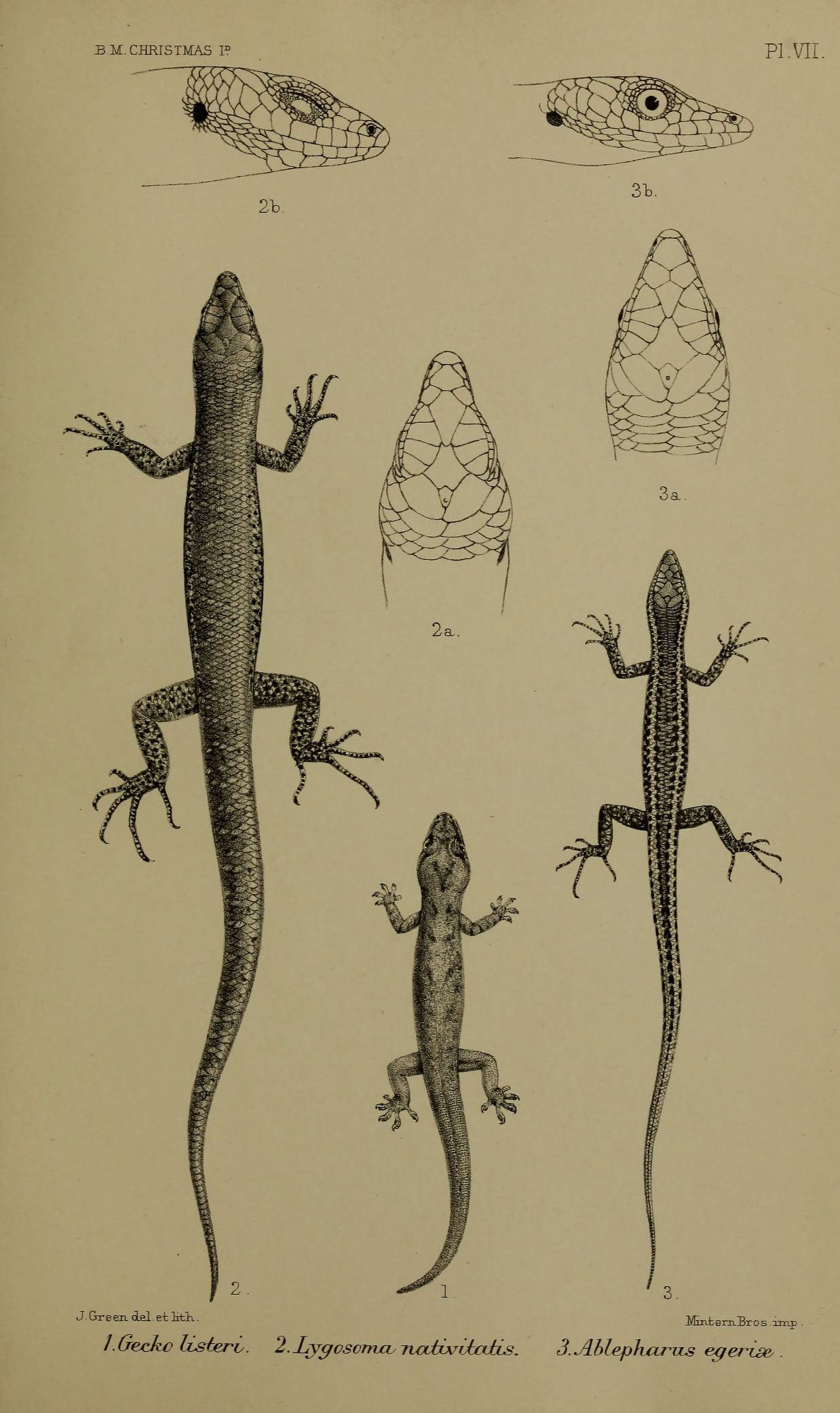
- L. listeri, figure 1 (centre).

Conservation status
- Extinct in the Wild (IUCN 3.1)

Scientific classification
- Kingdom: Animalia
- Phylum: Chordata
- Class: Reptilia
- Order: Squamata
- Suborder: Gekkota
- Family: Gekkonidae
- Genus: Lepidodactylus
- Species: L. listeri

Binomial name
- Lepidodactylus listeri (Boulenger,1889)

Synonyms
- Gecko listeri Boulenger, 1889; Lepidodactylus listeri — Kluge, 1968

= Lepidodactylus listeri =

Lister's gecko

Species of lizard

Lepidodactylus listeri, also known commonly as Lister's gecko and the Christmas Island chained gecko, is a species of lizard in the family Gekkonidae. The species was endemic to Christmas Island in the Indian Ocean. It is extinct in the wild.

== Geographic range ==
L. listeri was endemic to Christmas Island.

== Etymology ==
Both the specific name, listeri, and one of the common names, Lister's gecko, are in honour of British naturalist Joseph Jackson Lister.

== Description ==
Lister's gecko is a brown lizard growing to a snout-to-vent length (SVL) of 5 cm (2.0 in). It has a broad, pale fawn/grey vertebral stripe which expands to cover the top of the head and matches the colour and pattern of the tail. It has a whitish belly. The body is covered with small, smooth scales.

== Habitat ==
L. listeri was most abundant in primary rainforest on the plateau, but also occurred in disturbed secondary forest growth. It was absent from mined areas on the island.

== Behaviour ==
L. listeri is nocturnal and arboreal. During daylight hours, it shelters under bark.

== Reproduction ==
L. listeri is oviparous. Clutch size is two eggs.

== Evolutionary relationships ==
The closest relatives of L. listeri are species of Lepidodactylus belonging to the lugubris species group, native to the Mollucas and the Philippines, with the estimated divergence between L. listeri and the lugubris group taking place around 26 million years ago. Unlike L. lugubris, which can be triploid and reproduce through parthenogenesis, L. listeri is a diploid, sexually reproducing species.

== Decline ==
L. listeri was considered to be generally common in 1979, and was widespread across the island, but population declines were noted by researchers starting in 1998. Further decline was noted in 2004 and in 2008. By 2009, it was recognized that the species was in imminent danger of extinction, and a captive breeding program was established. The last record of L. listeri in its native habitat on Christmas Island was in October 2012.

The decline of L. listeri was concurrent with the widespread decline of most endemic mammal and reptile species on Christmas Island, and it is considered that this decline was the result of a common cause, or a combination thereof. The causes of this decline are not well understood. However it is believed that predation by introduced species, particularly the wolf snake (Lycodon capucinus), may have played a significant role. The wolf snake was introduced around 1982, which is within the timeframe that the population decline began.

== Conservation efforts ==
Prior to the extirpation of this species from Christmas Island, 43 individuals were taken into captivity, starting in August 2009, in order to establish a breeding population. This proved successful with a total population of over 1,500 individuals as of July 2022. However, reintroduction is unlikely to occur in the near future. Invasive threats are not yet controlled on Christmas Island, and assisted colonization is not yet feasible due to widespread gecko L. lugubris, which has an unknown conservation status.

== Genome ==
The genome of L. listeri was sequenced in 2022 (along with the Christmas Island blue-tailed skink), making it one of the earliest chromosome-level gecko genomes. The genome was genetically diverse, reflective of large historical population sizes. Despite the captive population being founded from just 43 individuals, there was not evidence of inbreeding in the genome.

== See also ==
- List of reptiles of Christmas Island
