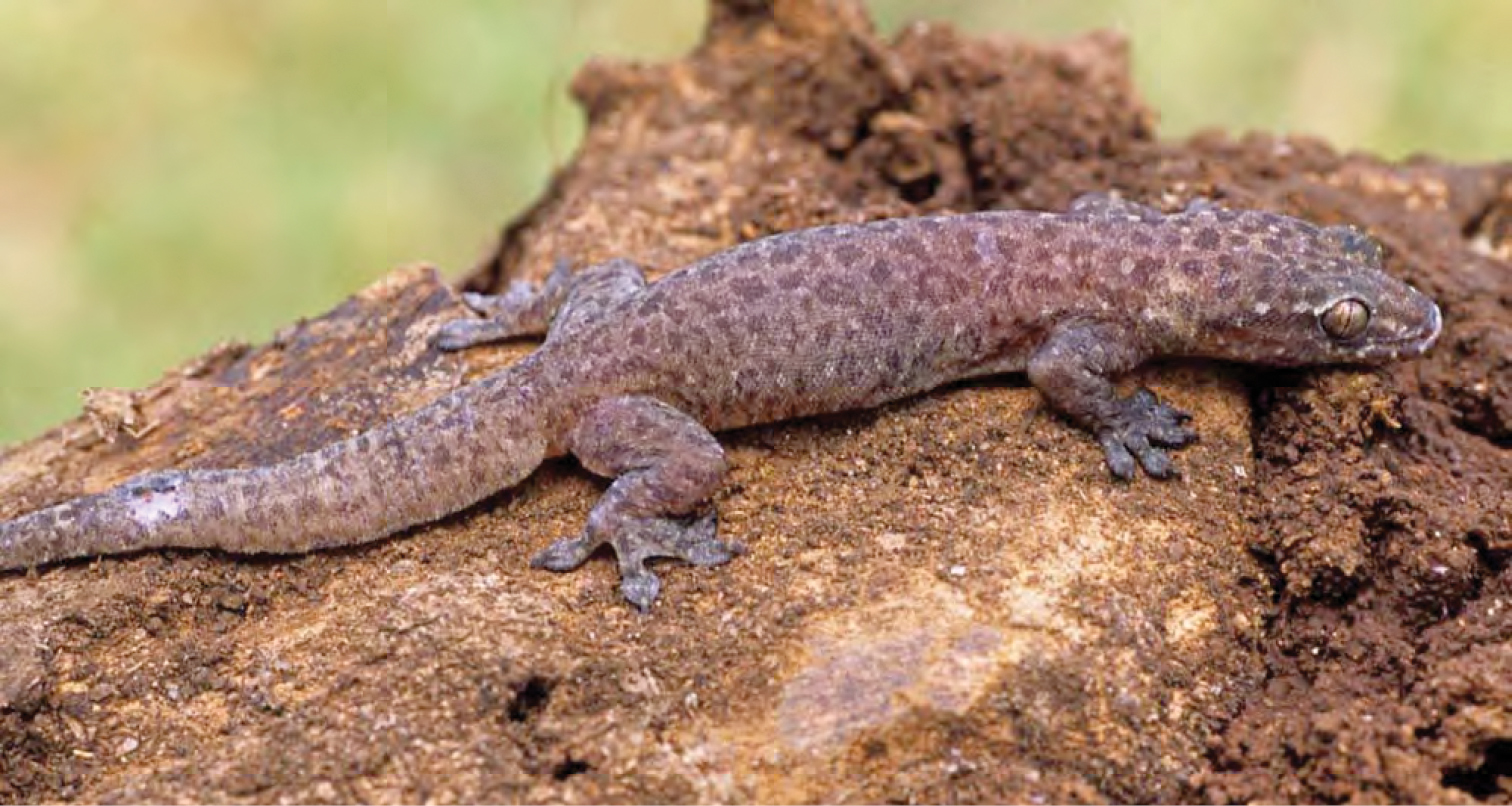

Conservation status
- Least Concern (IUCN 3.1)

Scientific classification
- Kingdom: Animalia
- Phylum: Chordata
- Class: Reptilia
- Order: Squamata
- Suborder: Gekkota
- Family: Gekkonidae
- Genus: Gehyra
- Species: G. mutilata

Binomial name
- Gehyra mutilata (Wiegmann, 1834)

Synonyms
- Hemidactylus mutilatus Wiegmann, 1834; Hemidactylus peronii A.M.C. Duméril & Bibron, 1836; Peropus mutilatus — Fitzinger, 1843; Peripia peronii — Gray, 1845; Hemidactylus platurus Bleeker, 1859; Gecko pardus Tytler, 1865; Peropus packardii Cope, 1869; Peripia mutilata — Günther, 1873; Hemidactylus navarri Dugès, 1883; Gehyra mutilata — Fischer, 1885; Gehyra butleri Boulenger, 1900; Gehyra beebei de Rooij, 1915; Peropus butleri — M.A. Smith, 1930; Gehyra mutilata — Liner, 1994

= Gehyra mutilata =

Species of lizard

Gehyra mutilata, also known commonly as the common four-clawed gecko, Pacific gecko, stump-toed gecko, sugar gecko in Indonesia, tender-skinned house gecko, and butiki in Filipino, is a species of lizard in the family Gekkonidae. The species is native to Southeast Asia. It has made its way to several areas of the world including Sri Lanka, Indochina, and many of the Pacific Islands. Compared to the common house gecko (Hemidactylus frenatus), the appearance of G. mutilata is somewhat plump, with delicate skin. The skin is usually colored a soft purplish/pinkish gray, with golden spots on younger specimens; these spots eventually fade with age.

== Description ==
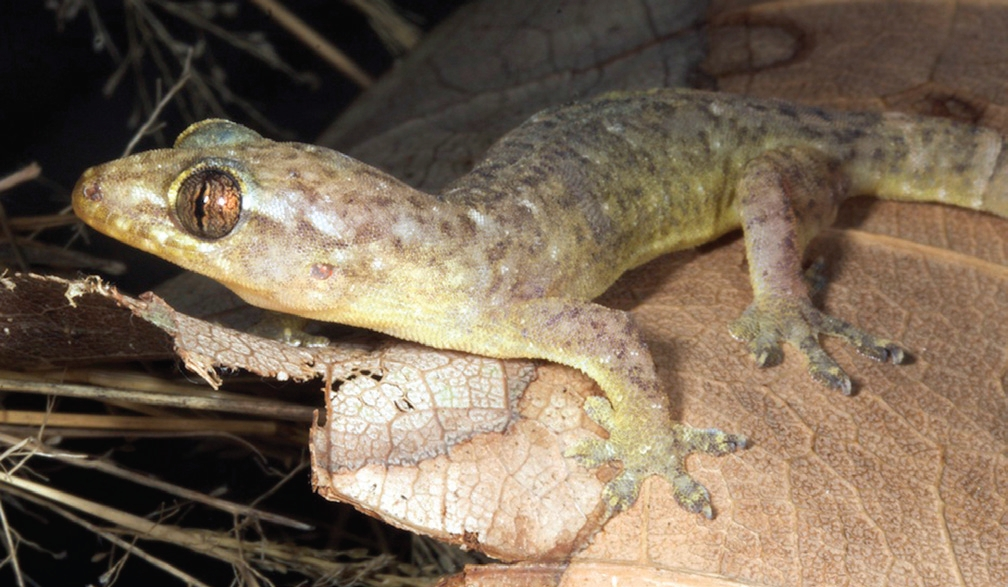
yhumb

The head of G. mutilata is longer than broad. The snout is longer than the distance between the eye and the ear-opening, about 1.3 times the diameter of the orbit. The forehead has a median groove. The ear-opening is moderately large and suboval. The body and limbs are moderately elongate and depressed. A fold of the skin borders the hind limb posteriorly. The digits are short and more or less webbed at the base. The inferior lamellae are angular and divided by a median groove. The upper surface of the body and the throat are covered with small granular scales, which are largest and flat on the back. The abdominal scales are moderate. The rostral is quadrangular, broader than deep, with a median cleft above. The nostril is pierced between the rostral, the first labial, and three nasals, the upper much the largest and generally in contact with its fellow. There are 8 or 9 upper labials, and 6 or 7 lower labials. The mental is moderately large and pentagonal. There are 3 pairs of chin shields. The innermost pair is very large and elongate. The outermost pair is small, frequently broken up into small scales. The femoral pores are in a doubly curved line, angular in the middle, 14 to 19 on each side. The tail is depressed, normally with a sharpish, minutely serrated lateral edge. The upper surface of the tail is covered with very small flat scales. Its lower surface generally has a median series of large transversely dilated scales. G. mutilata is greyish or reddish brown above, uniform or dotted or variegated with darker. The lower surfaces are uniform whitish.

G. mutilata may attain a snout-to-vent length (SVL) of 2.25 in (5.7 cm), with a tail length equal to SVL.

A key identification character is the absence of a claw on the innermost digit.

== Geographic range ==
The species G. mutilata is widely distributed throughout Borneo, southeastern China, French Polynesia, Hawaii (Maui), India, Indonesia, Malaysia, Singapore, the Mascarene Islands, western Mexico, Myanmar, Thailand, New Guinea, the Philippines, the Pitcairn Islands, Seychelles, and Sri Lanka.

== Behavior and habitat ==
Like many other geckos, G. mutilata is very adaptable to its surroundings, although it usually prefers woodlands, rocky areas, and human dwellings, at altitudes from sea level to 1,400 m (4,600 ft). It is also very common on sand beaches in Hawaii, where it is considered an invasive species. It makes itself at home in people's houses, and doesn't seem to mind the humans living beside it. Many people don't mind the gecko either, perhaps because, being a nocturnally active species, it spends much of its time high up on walls and ceilings. It is quite unobtrusive and helpfully preys on household insects.

Like many gecko species, G. mutilata is able to make noises to communicate. Its call, which sounds like "tock", is repeated six to eight times with increasing volume. It is also capable of running faster than other house geckos.

G. mutilata are often compared to the common gecko (H. frenatus) when it comes to habitat location, and it is often said that G. mutilata will not be found around H. frenatus although this pattern can differ depending on location.

== Diet ==
G. mutilata preys upon isopods, termites, and other small insects.

== Reproduction ==
G. mutilata is oviparous. Clutch size is one to three eggs, usually two.
