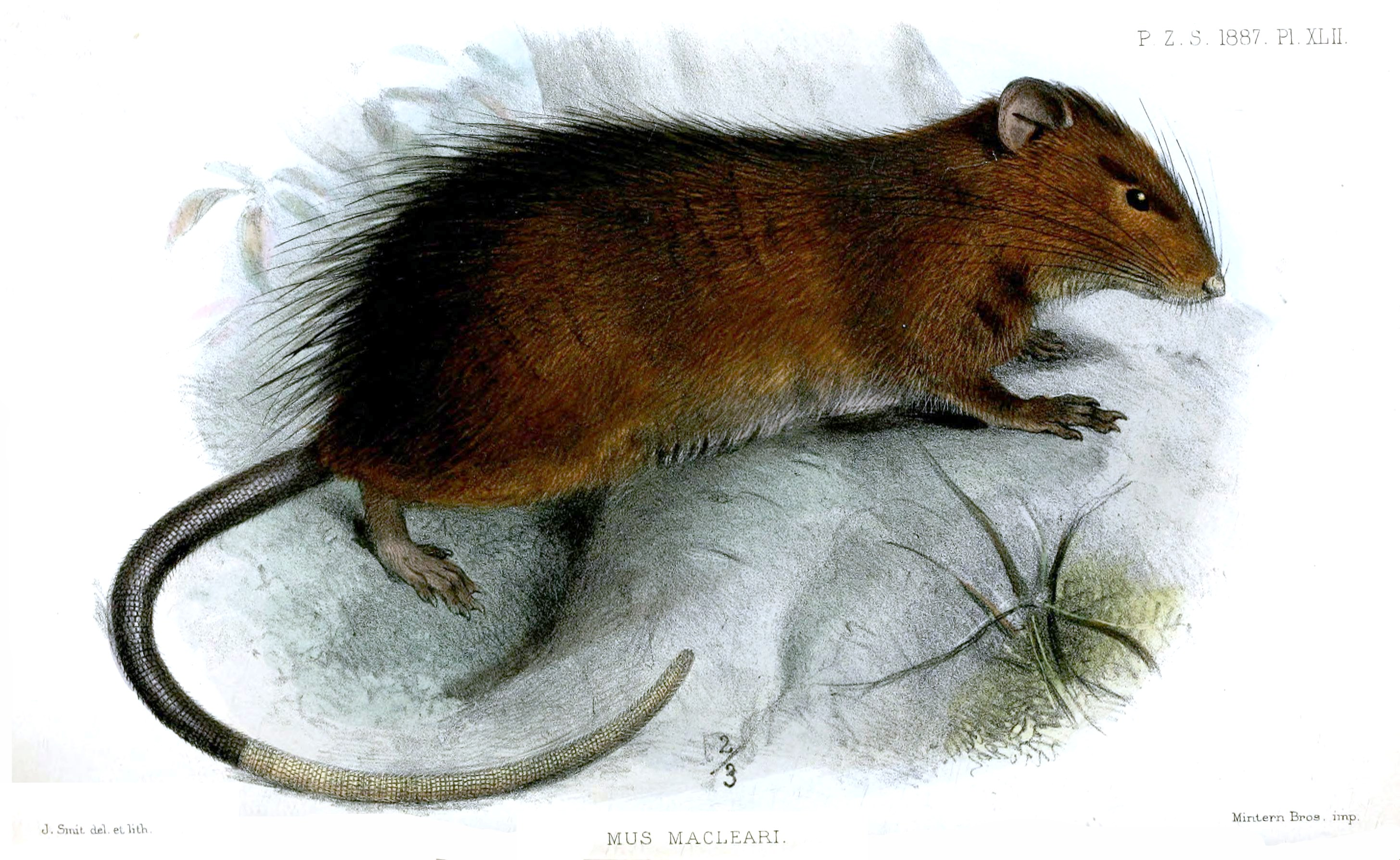

Conservation status
- Extinct (1903) (IUCN 3.1)

Scientific classification
- Kingdom: Animalia
- Phylum: Chordata
- Class: Mammalia
- Order: Rodentia
- Family: Muridae
- Genus: Rattus
- Species: †R. macleari

Binomial name
- †Rattus macleari (Thomas, 1887)

Synonyms
- Mus macleari Thomas, 1887

= Maclear's rat =

Extinct species of rodent

Maclear's rat (Rattus macleari) is an extinct large rat endemic to Christmas Island in the Indian Ocean. It was one of two species of rat native to Christmas Island, alongside the bulldog rat. Is also called the Christmas Island rat. Abundant, unfamiliar with and seemingly unafraid of humans, large numbers of the creatures emerged and foraged in all directions at night. Making querulous squeaks, the rats entered the Challenger expedition's tents and shelters in 1886, ran over sleepers, and upset everything in the search and fight for food. Maclear's rat might have been responsible for keeping the population of the Christmas Island red crab in check, as recent numbers of the crab are greater than in the past. It is thought that black rats inadvertently introduced by the expedition infected the Maclear's rats with a disease (possibly a trypanosome), which in turn could have contributed to the species' decline. The last recorded sighting was in 1903, although it is possible that Maclear's rats hybridized with black rats. A hard tick (Ixodes nitens), described as an ectoparasite of Maclear's rat, is also thought to be extinct.

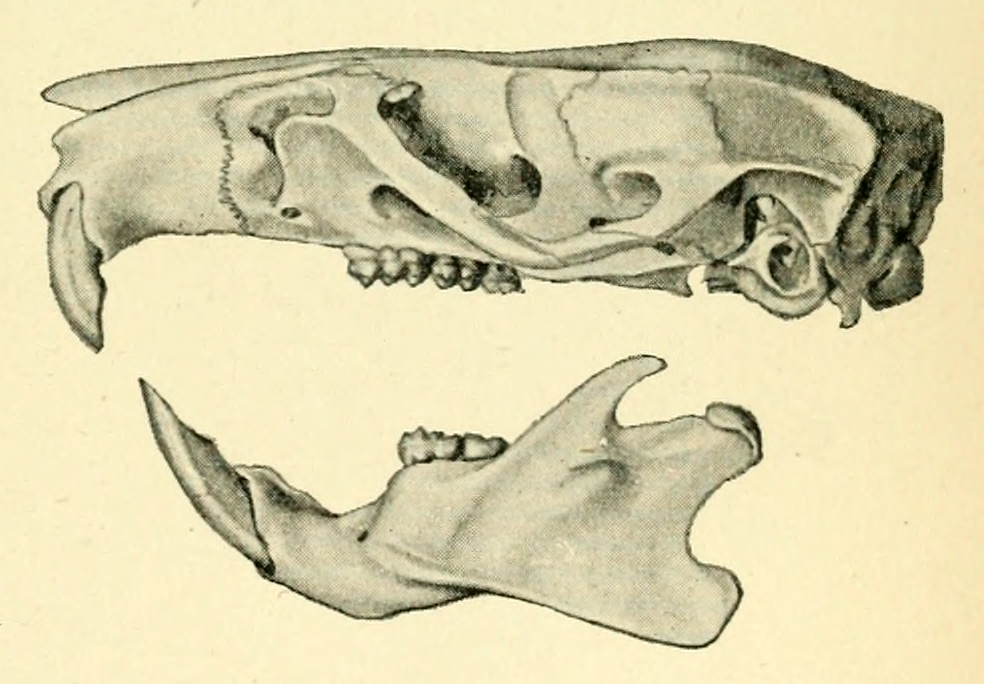
Skull

Said to be related to Rattus xanthurus of Sulawesi and R. everetti of the Philippines, this species was grizzled brown above and lighter on the underside. The lower back had prominent long and black hairs that projected above the shorter fur. The base of the tail was dark with the distal half being scaly white.

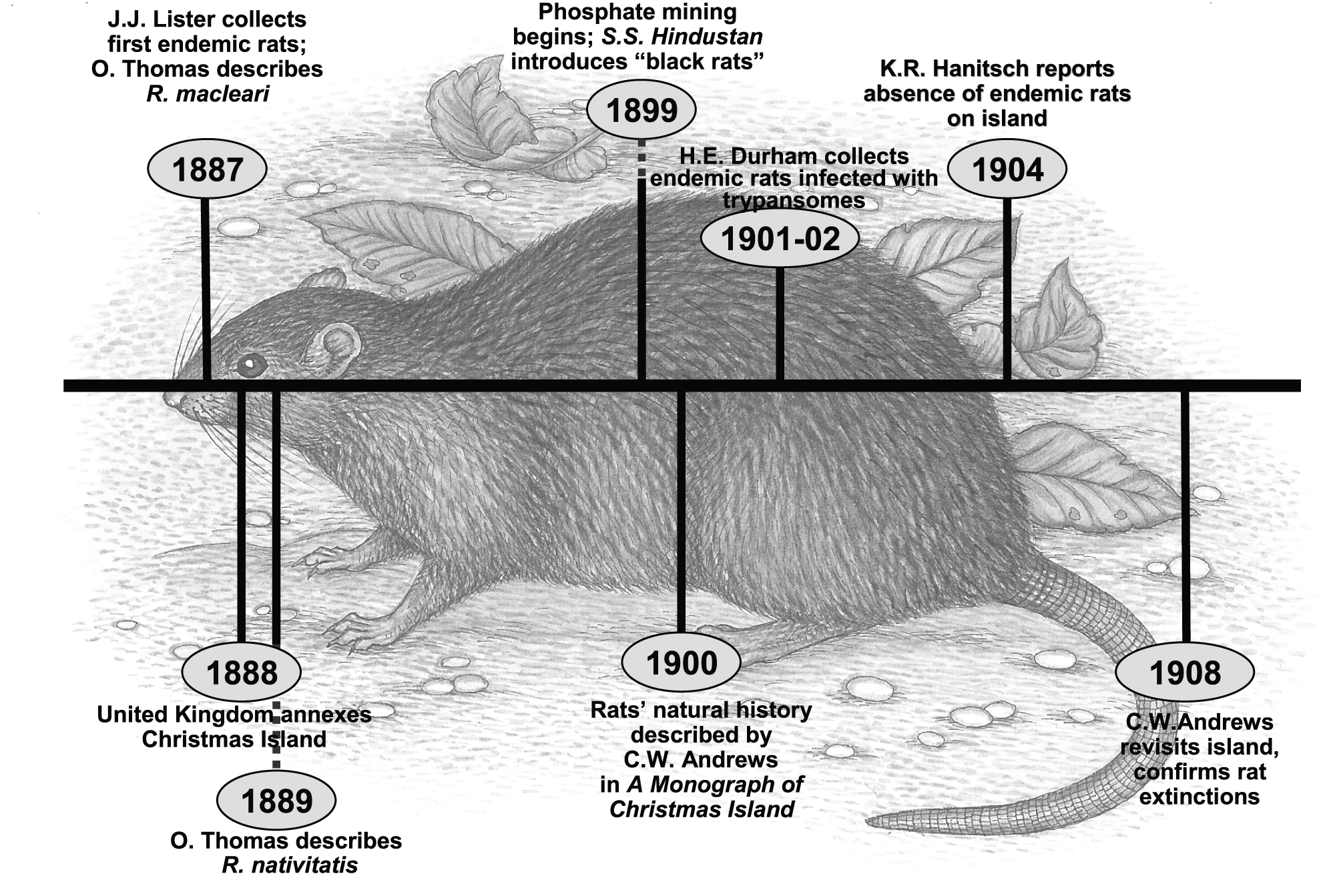
Extinction timeline for Christmas Island rats

The rat is named after Captain John Maclear (1838–1907) of the British survey-ship HMS Flying-Fish, who collected the specimen from Christmas Island in 1886. It was described as a new species by Oldfield Thomas the next year, although it was originally described under the genus Mus. Maclear was earlier commander on HMS Challenger for the Challenger Expedition of 1872–1876 under its commission captain, Sir George Nares.

A DNA study found Maclear's rat to be the sister species of Hainald's rat native to the island of Flores, with the clade containing the two being sister to the clade containing Nesokia and Bandicota; this clade, in turn, is sister to the Australasian Rattus radiation, making Rattus as currently defined paraphyletic.

== Potential revival ==
In March 2022, researchers discovered that Maclear's rat shared about 95% of its genes with the living brown rat, thus sparking ideas of bringing the species back to life. Although scientists were mostly successful in using CRISPR technology to edit the DNA of the brown rat to match that of Maclear's, a few key genes were missing, which would mean that the resurrected Maclear's rats would not be genetically pure replicas and would lack critical components such as scent and immunities.

== See also ==
- Trypanosoma lewisi
