= Bulldog rat =

Conservation status
- Extinct (1903) (IUCN 3.1)

Scientific classification
- Kingdom: Animalia
- Phylum: Chordata
- Class: Mammalia
- Order: Rodentia
- Family: Muridae
- Genus: Rattus
- Species: †R. nativitatis

Binomial name
- †Rattus nativitatis (Thomas, 1888)

Extinct species of rodent

The bulldog rat (Rattus nativitatis) is an extinct species of rat formerly endemic to Christmas Island in the Indian Ocean. It was one of two rats endemic to Christmas Island, alongside Maclear's rat.

== Description ==
The head and body length was about 25 to 27 centimetres (9.8 to 10.6 in), considerably larger than black rats, and their backs were covered in a two-centimetre thick layer of fat. They have been estimated to weigh 250 to 300 grams (8.8 to 10.6 oz). They had short, thick tails estimated to be around 17.5 centimetres (6.9 in) long. Their hair was described as being thick, coarse and dark reddish-brown in colour, with a slightly lighter underside. Despite being traditionally thought to be a part of the genus Rattus, the bulldog rat is now thought to be nested within Bunomys, a genus otherwise endemic to Sulawesi and the surrounding islands.

== Life history ==
The rats lived on the higher hills and denser forests of the island. They lived in small colonies, in burrows among the roots of trees or under hollow logs of sago palms in primary forest. They were sluggish and never climbed. Bulldog rats have been suggested to have been half-dazed in daylight and were strictly nocturnal.

== Extinction ==
The last record dates from 1903. They are suggested to have succumbed to a disease brought by black rats that had been inadvertently introduced by sailors, as mass die-offs are noted around 1902–1903, after which they were never seen again. Other abundant species on the island, such as the Maclear's rat, also went extinct.

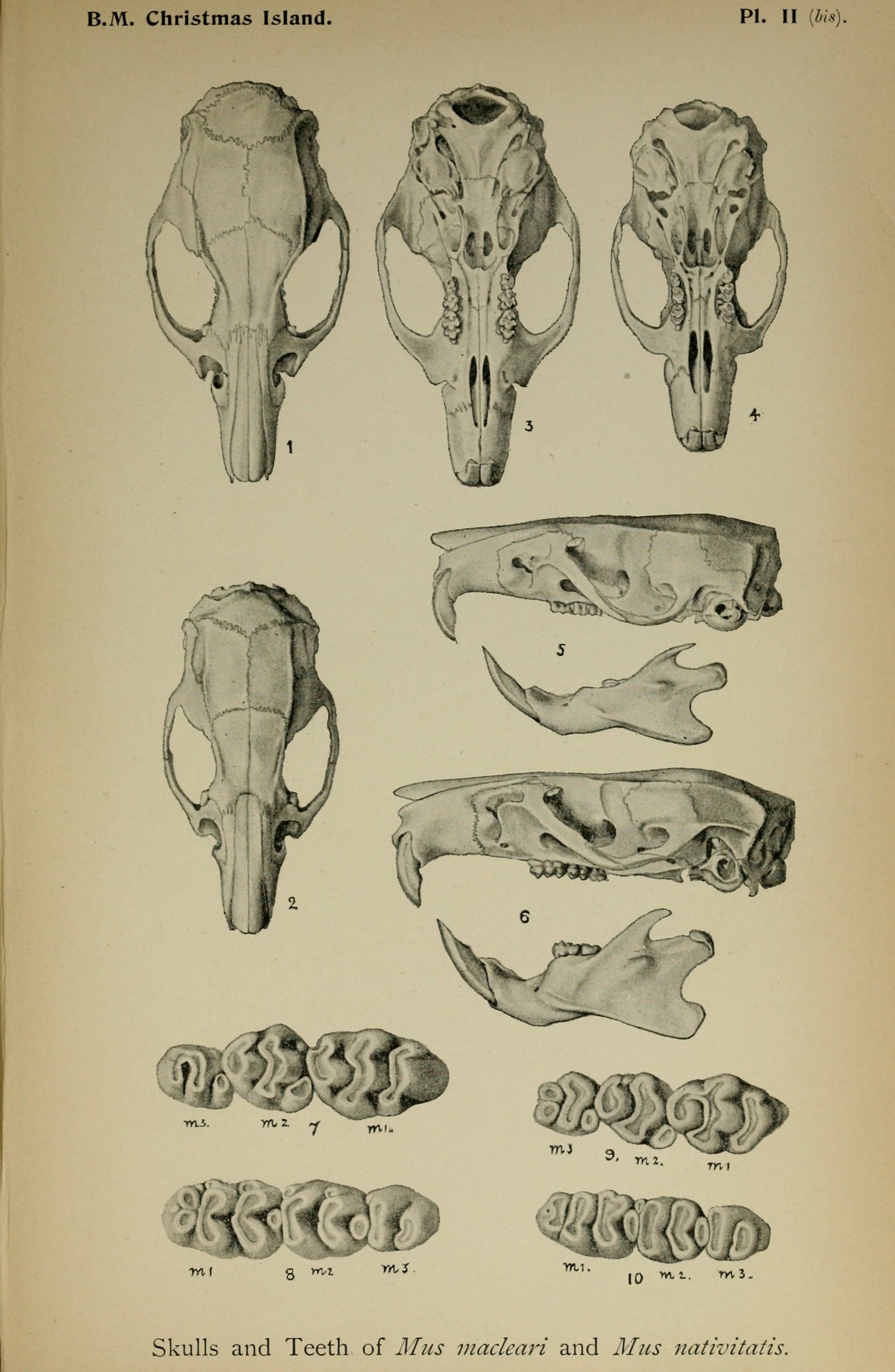
Skulls of R. nativitatis and R. macleari
