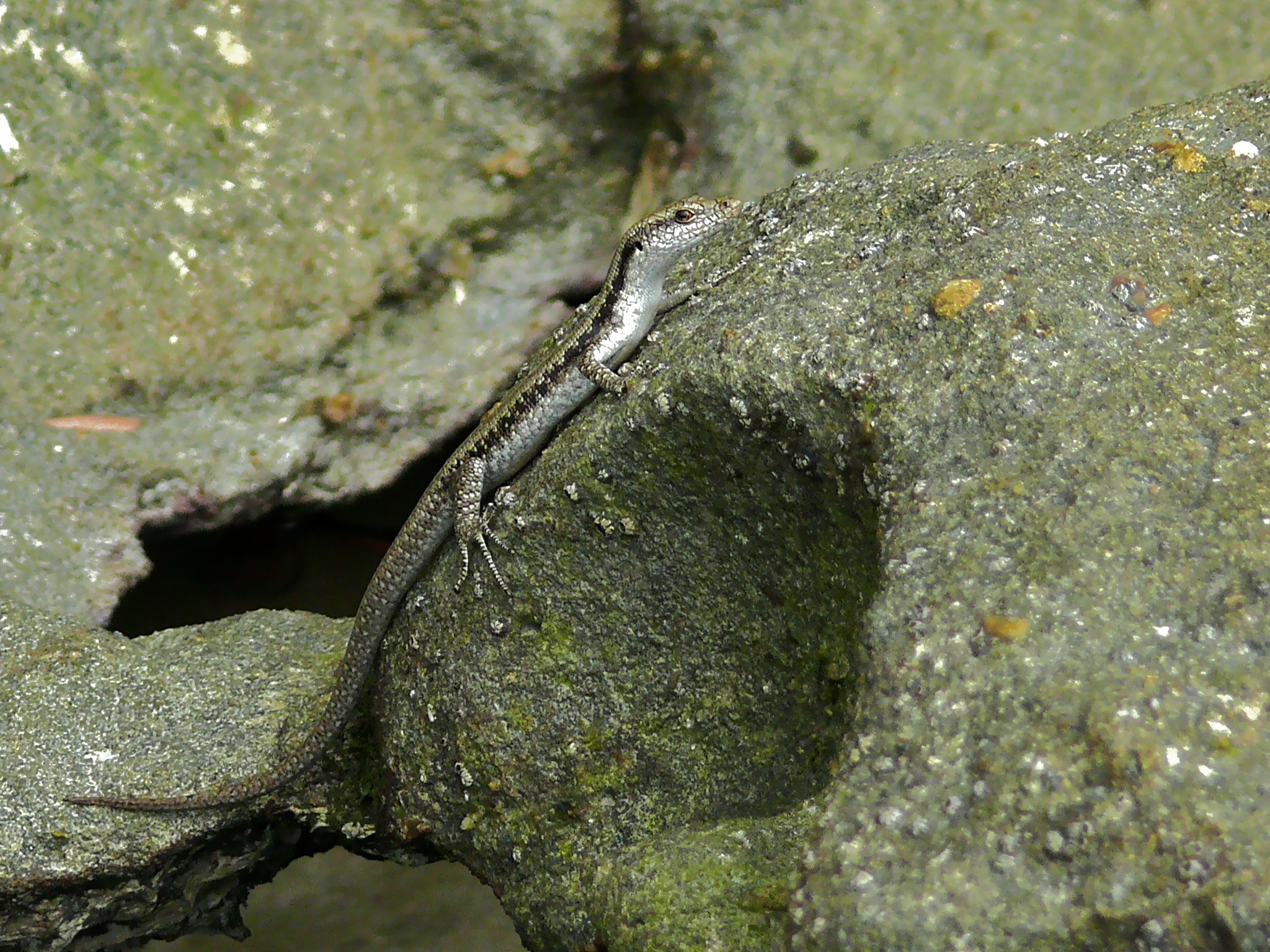

Conservation status
- Least Concern (IUCN 3.1)

Scientific classification
- Kingdom: Animalia
- Phylum: Chordata
- Class: Reptilia
- Order: Squamata
- Family: Scincidae
- Genus: Emoia
- Species: E. atrocostata

Binomial name
- Emoia atrocostata (Lesson, 1830)

Synonyms
- Scincus atrocostatus Lesson, 1830; Eumeces freycinetii Duméril & Bibron, 1839; Mocoa cumingi Gray, 1845; Euprepes bitaeniatus Peters, 1864; Mabouya jerdoniana Stoliczka, 1870; Eumeces singaporensis Steindachner, 1870; Euprepes parietalis Peters, 1871; Euprepes microstictus Peters, 1874; Mabouia marmorata Macleay, 1877; Mabouia irrorata Macleay, 1877; Eumeces serratus Fischer, 1886; Lygosoma sinus Smith, 1929; Lygosoma buergersi Vogt, 1932; Papuascincus buergersi (Vogt, 1932); Emoia manni Brown, 1948

= Emoia atrocostata =

Species of lizard

Emoia atrocostata, commonly known as the littoral whiptail-skink, mangrove skink, or littoral skink, is a species of lizard in the family Scincidae. It inhabits mangroves, back-beach vegetation and rocky shorelines. It is semi-aquatic and forages in tidal pools.

== Description ==
The species can be distinguished from the similar many-lined sun skink by the lack of keeled scales on the dorsal surface of the Mangrove Skink. Its colour is grey or brown-grey, flecked with black. There is a faint black band along each side. The throat is often bluish, and the belly greenish or yellow to orange.

== Distribution ==
E. atrocostata can be found on the Ryukyu Islands, Taiwan, the Philippines, Indonesia, Malaysia, Vietnam, Papua New Guinea, the Solomon Islands, Vanuatu and in Queensland, Australia.
