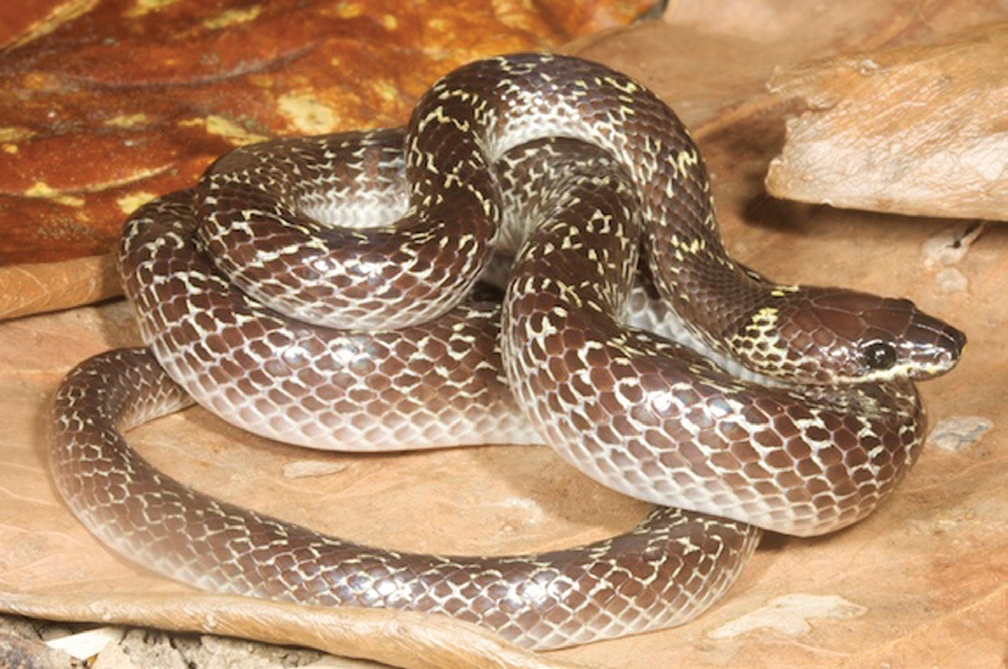

Conservation status
- Least Concern (IUCN 3.1)

Scientific classification
- Kingdom: Animalia
- Phylum: Chordata
- Class: Reptilia
- Order: Squamata
- Suborder: Serpentes
- Family: Colubridae
- Genus: Lycodon
- Species: L. capucinus

Binomial name
- Lycodon capucinus F.Boie, 1827

= Lycodon capucinus =

Species of snake

Lycodon capucinus, also known as the common wolf snake, is a species of colubrid snake commonly found in the Indo-Australian Archipelago. The species is named after the enlarged front teeth which give them a muzzled appearance similar to canines and makes the snout somewhat more squarish than other snakes.

== Description ==
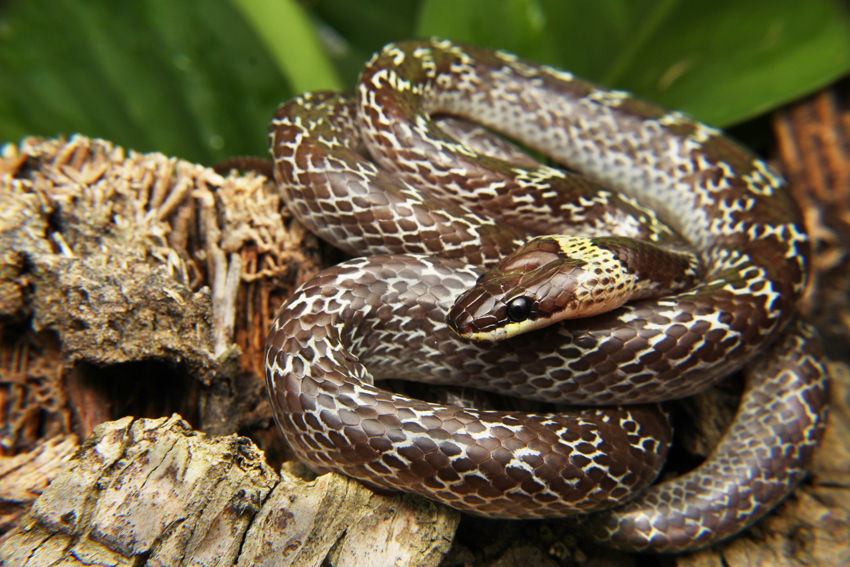
Lycodon capucinus from Pranburi Forest Park, Thailand.

A slender-bodied small snake that ranges from barely three feet to less than one meter. Most wild-caught specimens usually reach less than these lengths. Coloration is adapted for life underground and on the forest floor. Shades of jet black, reddish-brown or dark gray with speckles, blotches and spots of white or pale yellow scattered over the body are its usual colors. There is also a distinct white coloration around its neck. Their color patterns vary from one geographic location to another. There are albino-colored ones which are very rare among this snake species. The snout is duck-bill-shaped for digging in soft or sandy ground, with enlarged front teeth. This species is relatively benign (not harmful) to humans.

== Distribution ==
The common wolf snake is found in Cambodia, Thailand, Vietnam, Singapore, Laos, SE China, Hong Kong, Indonesia (Sumatra, Java, India, Bali, Sumbawa, Sumba, Komodo, Flores, Lomblen, Alor, Sawu, Roti, Timor, Wetar, Babar Islands, Kalao, Salajar, Buton, Sulawesi), West Malaysia, Johor: Pulau Besar, Maldives, Mascarenes (Mauritius, Reunion; fide Glaw, pers. comm.), Borneo, and The Philippines (Bantayan, Bohol, Cebu, Cuyo, Leyte, Luzon, Pampanga, Masbate, Mindanao, Mindoro, Negros, Palawan, Panay, Romblon, Samar), Tarlac.

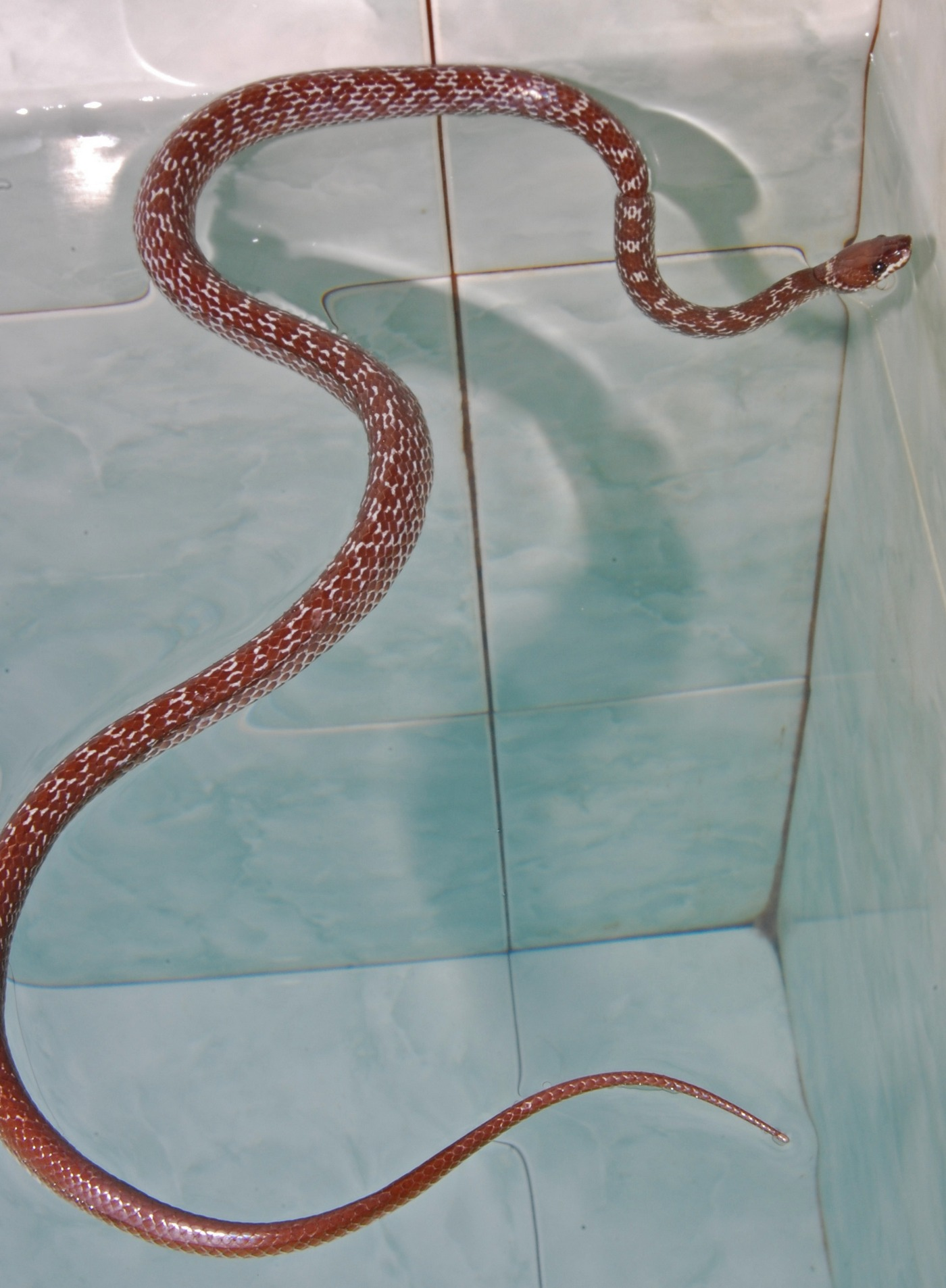

== Behavior ==
The common wolf snake is non-venomous. Even when they do bite humans, the impact is usually not harmful. Most bites result in pain and swelling, and do not result in any serious harm. It is quite a nervous snake when picked up or handled and will not hesitate to bite. They may also move their tails in a to-and-fro motion much like a rattlesnake when they feel threatened. A fossorial animal, it loves burrowing down in the earth but is most often found in open ground, on rocks or in low vegetation, sometimes showing a semi-arboreal behavior. A nocturnal creature, it is most active during the night, but is also observed during daybreak. It also climbs on walls of any building. Most captive specimens become tame after some time and with proper handling.

== Diet ==
In the wild, Lycodon capucinus feeds mainly on small lizards such as geckos and they are also among the top predators of skinks which makes it common to humans due to the abundance of prey near and in homes. They may also devour small frogs, if available. In captivity, they may be trained to feed on slender fishes such as goby or lizard-scented pinkie mice, though the latter proves to be harder.

== Conservation status ==
The IUCN listed this species as of 'Least Concern.' Though a very common snake, it is seldom seen. Continuous destruction of primary and secondary forests, conversion of fertile lands to agricultural and residential areas as well as indiscriminate human killings can threaten the survival of this animal. It is endangered in numerous parts of mainland Asia and peninsular Southeast Asia.
