= List of ship launches in 1873 =

The list of ship launches in 1873 includes a chronological list of some ships launched in 1873.

Date	Ship	Class / type	Builder	Location	State	Notes
1 January	Encounter	Amethyst-class corvette		Chatham Dockyard	United Kingdom	For Royal Navy.
2 January	Colombia	Steamship	Messrs. Laird Bros.	Birkenhead	United Kingdom	For Pacific Steam Navigation Company.
11 January	Basuto	Steamship	Robert Thompson Jr.	Sunderland	United Kingdom	For Union Steamship Co.
11 January	Duke of Argyll	Paddle steamer	Messrs. Robert Duncan & Co.	Port Glasgow	United Kingdom	For Dublin & Glasgow Steam Packet Co.
13 January	Denderah	Steamship	Messrs. Withy, Alexander & Co.	Middleton	United Kingdom	For private owner.
14 January	Galicia	Steamship	Messrs. R. Napier & Sons	Govan	United Kingdom	For Pacific Steam Navigation Company.
16 January	Renard	Beagle-class schooner	John Cuthbert	Millers Point	(United Kingdom of Great Britain and Ireland) New South Wales	For Royal Navy.
17 January	Belgic	Passenger ship	Harland and Wolff	Belfast	United Kingdom	For White Star Line.
23 January	Rose Schneider	Schooner	Robert Allen & Son.	Pembroke	United Kingdom	For Joseph Fisher.
27 January	Volant	Steamship	Messrs. J. Humphrey & Co.	Aberdeen	United Kingdom	For Messrs. J. Humphrey & Co.
28 January	Quinta	Steamship	Messrs. Denton, Gray & Co.	West Hartlepool	United Kingdom	For Flensburg Steam Shipping Company.
29 January	St. Fergus	Schooner	John Webster	Fraserburgh	United Kingdom	For James Bremner.
30 January	Ben Ledi	Steamship	James Laing	Sunderland	United Kingdom	For J. Morrison.
30 January	Ianthe	Steamship	Messrs. Henry Murray & Co.	Port Glasgow	United Kingdom	For Messrs. Thomas Russell & Son.
30 January	Sea Gull	Steamship	Iliff & Mounsey	Sunderland	United Kingdom	For Basden, Townsend & Co.
January	African	Steamship	Mr. Key	Kinghorn	United Kingdom	For Union Steamship Co.
January	Boldon	Barque	John Crown	Sunderland	United Kingdom	For John Crown.
January	Danaë	Steamship	Iliff & Mounsey	Sunderland	United Kingdom	For J. Robinson & Co.
January	Gazelle	Merchantman	Philip Bellot	Gorey	(United Kingdom of Great Britain and Ireland) Jersey	For Joseph Moses.
January	Hankow	Paddle steamer	William Pile & Co	Sunderland	United Kingdom	For John Robert Kelso. Incorporated half of Lark in build, with a new bow or stern section.
January	Lilian	Paddle steamer	William Pile & Co	Sunderland	United Kingdom	For C. H. Ellis & C. H. Stewart. Incorporated half of Lark in build, with a new bow or stern section.
January	Minstrel King	Barque	Richard Thompson	Sunderland	United Kingdom	For Jacobs & Co.
January	Nellie	Ketch	Charles W. Aubin	Jersey	(United Kingdom of Great Britain and Ireland) Jersey	For Elijah Seagers.
January	Pearl	Steamship			United Kingdom	For private owner.
January	St. Peter	Steamship	Blumer & Co	Sunderland	United Kingdom	For J. Blumer & Co.
January	Wallace	Steamship	Messrs. T. R. Oswald & Co.	Sunderland	United Kingdom	For John H. Watt.
1 February	Hope	Whaler	Messrs. Alexander Hall & Co.	Aberdeen	United Kingdom	For private owners.
11 February	Ariel	Ariel-class gunboat		Chatham Dockyard	United Kingdom	For Royal Navy.
11 February	City of Chester	Steamship	John Roach & Sons	Chester, Pennsylvania	United Kingdom	For Oregon Railroad and Navigation Company.
11 February	Conflict	Beagle-class schooner	John Cuthbert	Millers Point	(United Kingdom of Great Britain and Ireland) New South Wales	For Royal Navy.
11 February	Frundsberg	Corvette	Stabilimento Tecnico Triestino	Trieste	Austria-Hungary	For Austro-Hungarian Navy.
11 February	Zephyr	Ariel-class gunboat		Chatham Dockyard	United Kingdom	For Royal Navy.
12 February	Duke of Argyll	Steamship	Messrs. Rober Duncan & Co.	Port Glasgow	United Kingdom	For Eastern Steamship Co.
12 February	Pennsylvania	Steamship	London and Glasgow Engineering and Iron Shipbuilding Company (Limited)	Glasgow	United Kingdom	For State Line Steamship Company (Limited).
13 February	Burton	Fishing smack	Messrs. J. Wray & Son	Burton upon Stather	United Kingdom	For Burton-upon-Stather Shipping Co.
13 February	Guriezo	Steamship	Messrs. Hanna, Donald & Wilson	Paisley	United Kingdom	For Messrs. Cruickshanks & Co.
13 February	Helen Hutchison	Schooner	Messrs. Carnegie & Matthew	Peterhead	United Kingdom	For Mr. Hutchison.
13 February	Willem Kroonprins der Nederlanden	Steamship	Messrs. Charles Connell & Co.	Whiteinch	United Kingdom	For Netherland India Steam Navigation Co.
14 February	Braemar Castle	Steamship	Messrs. J. & G. Thomson	Glasgow	United Kingdom	For Castle Line.
15 February	City of Richmond	Steamship	Messrs. Tod & MacGregor	Partick	United Kingdom	For Inman Line.
15 February	Dante	Steamship	Messrs. Bowdler, Chaffer & Co	Seacombe	United Kingdom	For Messrs. M'Andrews & Co.
15 February	Eglinton	Steamship	Messrs. John Fullerton & Co	Merksworth	United Kingdom	For G. Carr.
15 February	Hakon Adelstern	Paddle steamer	Messrs. Backhouse & Dixon	Middlesbrough	United Kingdom	For private owner.
15 February	Pembroke	Steamship	Messrs. W. Simons & Co.	Renfrew	United Kingdom	For South Wales Atlantic Steam Ship Co.
15 February	The Tasman	Steamship	Messrs. Gordon & Blackwood	Port Glasgow	United Kingdom	For Tasmanian Steam Navigation Company.
25 February	Seaflower	Brig		Pembroke Dockyard	United Kingdom	For Royal Navy.
26 February	Douglas	Steamship	Messrs. Hall, Russell & Co	Aberdeen	United Kingdom	For Messrs. Douglas, Lapraik & Co.
28 February	E. L. Margaret	Brig	Messrs. R. A. Prichard & Co	Pwllheli	United Kingdom	For private owner.
28 February	Lady Windermere	Barque		Grangemouth	United Kingdom	For private owner.
February	Beautiful Star	Merchantman	James Geddie Jr.	Garmouth	United Kingdom	For private owners.
1 March	City of Aberdeen	Steamship	Messrs. Cunliffe & Dunlop	Port Glasgow	United Kingdom	For Aberdeen Steam Navigation Co.
1 March	Ibis	Steamship	Messrs. Withy, Alexander & Co.	Middleton	United Kingdom	For Kosmos Steam Navigation Co.
1 March	Lisette	Steam yacht	Messrs. Hansen & Sons	Cowes	United Kingdom	For Mr. Gower.
1 March	Raleigh	Frigate	Chatham Dockyard	Chatham	United Kingdom	For Royal Navy.
3 March	Eldorado	Merchantman	Messrs. Earle's	Kingston upon Hull	United Kingdom	For private owner.
3 March	Islay	Steamship	Messrs. John Elder & Co	Fairfield	United Kingdom	For Pacific Steam Navigation Company.
4 March	Anglian	Steamship	Messrs. Aitken & Mansel	Whiteinch	United Kingdom	For Messrs. William Ross & Co.
5 March	Flower of the Fleet	Sloop	John Barter & Son	Brixham	United Kingdom	For Samuel D. Mills.
10 March	Lou Cettori	Steamship	Messrs. Scott & Co.	Cartsdyke	United Kingdom	For Compagnie Valery Frères et Fils.
11 March	Alabama	Steamship	Messrs. Thomas Wingate & Co	Whiteinch	United Kingdom	For State Line.
11 March	Luxor	Steamship	Messrs. Denton, Gray & Co.	West Hartlepool	United Kingdom	For private owner.
13 March	Fleetwing	Yacht	Robinson	Gosport	United Kingdom	For Mr. West.
15 March	Cotopaxi	Steamship	Messrs. John Elder & Co.	Fairfield	United Kingdom	For Pacific Steam Navigation Company.
15 March	Douglas	Steamship	Messrs. Turnbull & Son	Whitby	United Kingdom	For Messrs. Pyman, Bell & Co.
15 March	Drepano	Steamship	W. Watson	Sunderland	United Kingdom	For La Trinacria Società di Navigazione á Vapeur.
21 March	Cambria	Humber Keel	Joseph Burton	Selby	United Kingdom	For Messrs. Charles & William Ford.
25 March	Indiana	Pennsylvania-class steamship	William Cramp & Sons	Philadelphia, Pennsylvania	United States	For American Steamship Company.
26 March	Fantome	Fantome-class sloop		Chatham Dockyard	United Kingdom	For Royal Navy.
29 March	Abbotsford	Passenger ship	Gourlay Brothers	Dundee	United Kingdom	For Red Star Line.
29 March	Atlas	Steamship	Messrs. M'Kellar, M'Millan & Co.	Dumbarton	United Kingdom	For Messrs. Leech, Harrison & Forwood.
29 March	Guetteur	Sailing vessel (cutter)	Arsenal de Cherbourg	Cherbourg	France	For French Navy
29 March	Auriga	Yacht	Michael Ratsey	cowes	United Kingdom	For L. W. Close.
29 March	City of Chester	Passenger ship	Caird & Company	Greenock	United Kingdom	For Inman Line.
29 March	Consolation	Steamship	Messrs. Aitken & Mansel	Whiteinch	United Kingdom	For Donald R. Macgregor.
29 March	Florinda	Yawl	Messrs. Camper & Nicholson	Gosport	United Kingdom	For W. Jessop.
29 March	Hooper	Cable ship	Messrs. Charles Mitchell & Co.	Newcastle upon Tyne	United Kingdom	For Hooper's Telegraph Works (Limited).
29 March	Julio Diniz	Steamship	Messrs. J. & R. Swan	Dumbarton	United Kingdom	For Progresso Maritimo do Porto.
29 March	Norbiton	Steamship	Messrs. Withy, Alexander & Co.	Hartlepool	United Kingdom	For private owner.
29 March	Sultan	Steamship	Messrs. Green	Blackwall	United Kingdom	For Messrs. Green.
29 March	Virginia	Steamship	London and Glasgow Engineering and Iron Shipbuilding Company (Limited)	Glasgow	United Kingdom	For State Line Steamship company (Limited).
31 March	Life Brigade	Steamship	Robert Thompson Jr.	Sunderland	United Kingdom	For E. Shotton & Co.
March	Celestial	Steamship	Blake & Co.	Northfleet	United Kingdom	For James C. Kerr.
March	El Dorado	Steamship	Messrs. Earle	Hull	United Kingdom	For Wilson India Line.
Unknown date	Petrarch	Steamship	Bowdler, Chaffer & Co.	Seacombe	United Kingdom	For George MacAndrew and others.
March	Uberty	Schooner	Allix	Jersey	(United Kingdom of Great Britain and Ireland) Jersey	For Charles Barclay.
1 April	Braunschweig	Steamship	Messrs. Robert Steele & Co.	Cartsdyke	United Kingdom	For Norddeutscher Lloyd.
1 April	Rôdeur	Rôdeur-class wheeled aviso	Jollet & Babin	Nantes	France	For French Navy
1 April	Francisco Calderon	Steamship	Archibald M'Millan & Son	Dumbarton	United Kingdom	For Compania Maritima del Peru.
1 April	Selah Chamberlain	Steamship	Quayle & Martin	Cleveland, Ohio	United States	For Alva Bradley.
2 April	Isidora	Steamship	Messrs. Backhouse & Dixon	Middlesbrough	United Kingdom	For private owner.
4 April	Robert Kirkwood	Fishing smack	Messrs. Alexander Hall & Co.	Footdee	United Kingdom	For Shetland Fishing Company (Limited).
7 April	Princess Louisa	Steamship	Messrs. Alexander Hall & Co.	Footdee	United Kingdom	For Duke of Sutherland.
10 April	Amethyst	Amethyst-class corvette		Devonport Dockyard	United Kingdom	For Royal Navy.
12 April	Ithaca	Steamship	Robert Thompson Jr.	Sunderland	United Kingdom	For Anderson, Horan & Co.
12 April	No. 189	Steamship	Messrs. Richardson, Duck & Co	South Stockton	United Kingdom	For private owner.
14 April	Heather Bell	Yacht	Michael Ratsey	Cowes	United Kingdom	For Mr. Schneider.
15 April	Haining	Steamship	Messrs. Humphrys & Pearson	Hull	United Kingdom	For Messrs. Matheson & Co.
15 April	Owl	Steamship	Messrs. Tod & MacGregor	Partick	United Kingdom	For Messrs. Burns.
16 April	Duke of Sutherland	Steamship	Messrs. Robert Duncan & Co.	Port Glasgow	United Kingdom	For Ducal Line.
16 April	Tartar	Steamship	Messrs. Dpbie & Co.	Govan	United Kingdom	For Messrs. James Howden & Co.
18 April	Feldmarschall von Moltke	Steamship	Messrs. Caird & Co.	Greenock	United Kingdom	For Norddeutscher Lloyd.
21 April	Shamrock	Yawl	James Comerford	Malahide	United Kingdom	For Lord Talbot de Malahide.
23 April	Lucerne	Schooner			United States	For William Mack & others.
26 April	American	Steamship	Messrs. Alexander Stephen & Sons	Dundee	United Kingdom	For Union Steamship Co.
26 April	Maracaibo	Steamship	Messrs. William Hamilton & Co.	Port Glasgow	United Kingdom	For Hamburg-Amerikanische Packetfahrt-Actien-Gesellschaft. Capsized on being launched.
26 April	Mary Bell	Schooner	William Ashburner	Barrow-in-Furness	United Kingdom	For Thomas Ashburner.
26 April	Matin	Steamship	Messrs. Hall, Russell & Co.	Aberdeen	United Kingdom	For Messrs. Mudie.
26 April	Queen of the Bay	Steamship	Allsup	Preston	United Kingdom	For Ribble Navigation Co.
26 April	Tacna	Steamship	Messrs. Bowdler, Chaffer & Co.	Seacombe	United Kingdom	For Pacific Steam Navigation Company.
28 April	Fifeshire	Steamship	Mr. Key	Kinghorn	United Kingdom	For private owner.
28 April	Goethe	Steamship	Messrs. R. Napier & Sons	Govan	United Kingdom	For Deutsche Transatlantische Dampfsschiffahrts Gesellschaft.
April	Morna	Schooner	Messrs. Camper & Nicholson	Gosport	United Kingdom	For private owner.
April	Severn	Steamship	T. R. Oswald	Sunderland	United Kingdom	For Royal Mail Line.
April	Ventura	Ketch	R. A. Ayles	Weymouth	United Kingdom	For Wilson, Sons & Co.
12 May	Aries	Steam yacht	Barrow Ship Building Co. Ltd.	Barrow-in-Furness	United Kingdom	For Sir James Ramsden.
12 May	Glenfalloch	Steamship	London and Glasgow Shipbuilding Co.	Govan	United Kingdom	For Messrs. A. C. Gow & Co.
13 May	James Malam	Steamship	Messrs. Withy, Alexander & Co.	Middleton	United Kingdom	For Messrs. Groves, MacLean & Co.
14 May	Gleam	Yacht	Messrs. Bowdler, Chaffer & Co.	Seacombe	United Kingdom	For David MacIver.
14 May	Potosi	Steamship	Messrs. John Elder & Co.	Govan	United Kingdom	For Pacific Steam Navigation Company.
15 May	Alkelda	Yacht	Messrs. Camper & Nicholson	Gosport	United Kingdom	For William Topham.
15 May	Aveyron	Yacht	E. Robertson	Ipswich	United Kingdom	For E. Packard Jr.
15 May	Jamapa	Barquentine	Messrs. Norvill Bros.	Llanelly	United Kingdom	For Messrs. Samuel Baker & Co.
15 May	Phœnix	Yacht	Malcolmson Bros.	Waterford	United Kingdom	For William Spaight.
15 May	Shanklin	Steamship	John White	Cowes	United Kingdom	For Isle of Wight Steam Ferry Company, Limited.
15 May	Ventnor	Steamship	John White	Cowes	United Kingdom	For Isle of Wight Steam Ferry Company, Limited.
17 May	Marie	Steamship	Messrs. J. & R. Swan	Dumbarton	United Kingdom	For Messrs. M'Kinney & Rafferty.
23 May	Modeste	Amethyst-class corvette		Devonport Dockyard	United Kingdom	For Royal Navy.
24 May	Daisy	Steamship	Messrs. Turnbull & Son	Whitby	United Kingdom	For Messrs. J. Turnbull, Son, & Co.
24 May	Hohenzollern	Steamship	Earle's Shipbuilding & Engineering Co.	Hull	United Kingdom	For Norddeutscher Lloyd.
27 May	James Macpherson	Steamship	Messrs. John Humphrey & Co.	Aberdeen	United Kingdom	For private owner.
27 May	James Seed	Schooner	Messrs. W. Allsup & Son	Preston	United Kingdom	For Messrs. J. Seed & Co.
28 May	Britannia	Steamship	Messrs. Laird Bros.	Birkenhead	United Kingdom	For Pacific Steam Navigation Company.
28 May	Eleanor	Paddle steamer	Robert Stephenson and Company	Newcastle upon Tyne	United Kingdom	For London and North Western Railway.
28 May	John Bramall	Steamship	Messrs. M. Pearse & Co.	Stockton-on-Tees	United Kingdom	For Messrs. J. B. Walker & Co.
28 May	Nantes	Steamship	Messrs. Blackwood & Gordon	Port Glasgow	United Kingdom	For Cunard Line.
28 May	Nixie	Cutter	Mr. Clare Lallow	Cowes	United Kingdom	For Alfred Sartoris.
31 May	Aviles	Steamship	Messrs. Cunliffe & Dunnlop	Port Glasgow	United Kingdom	For Aviles Steam Navigation Company.
31 May	County of Sutherland	Steamship	Messrs. Charles Connell & Co.	Scotstoun	United Kingdom	For Messrs. R. & J. Craig.
2 June	Novgorod	monitor	New Admiralty Shipyard	Saint Petersburg	Russia	For Imperial Russian Navy.
2 June	William Hewson	Humber Keel		Wakefield	United Kingdom	For William Hewson.
6 June	Hercules	Mersey flat	Bridgewater Trustees, or Bridgewater Navigation Company	Runcorn	United Kingdom	For private owner.
7 June	Gathorn	Steamship	Messrs. Charles Hill & Sons	Cardiff	United Kingdom	For Messrs. Charles Hill & Sons.
10 June	Solway	Steamship	Messrs. Withy, Alexander & Co.	Hartlepool	United Kingdom	For Messrs. Steel, Young & Co.
11 June	Montana	Steamship	Messrs. C. M. Palmer & Co.	Jarrow	United Kingdom	For Guion Line.
11 June	Snowdrop	Steamship	Messrs. R. Irvine & Co.	West Hartlepool	United Kingdom	For Messrs. Cory, Lohden & Co.
12 June	Dakota	Steamship	Messrs. Palmers	Jarrow	United Kingdom	For Guion Line.
12 June	Hesperia	Schooner	William Fife	Fairlie	United Kingdom	For George Elder.
12 June	Petter Stahle	Steamship	Davison & Stokoe	Sunderland	United Kingdom	For E. S. Jobson & Co.
13 June	Georgia	Steamship	London and Glasgow Shipbuilding Company	Govan	United Kingdom	For State Line Steamship Company (Limited).
16 June	Croya	Paddle steamer	Messrs. John Elder & Co.	Fairfield	United Kingdom	For Pacific Steam Navigation Company.
16 June	Von Roon	Steamship	Messrs. Caird & Co.	Greennock	United Kingdom	For Norddeutsche Lloyd.
23 June	Nederland	Steamship	Messrs. Palmer & Co.	Jarrow	United Kingdom	For International Navigation Co.
23 June	Sceptre	Steamship	Messrs. Palmer & Co.	Jarrow	United Kingdom	For Messrs. Hall & Co.
25 June	Duke of Devonshire	Steamship	Barrow Ship Building Co. Ltd.	Barrow-in-Furness	United Kingdom	For Eastern Steamship Co.
25 June	Hardwick	Steamship	Messrs. M. Pearse & Co.	Stockton-on-Tees	United Kingdom	For Messrs. Appleby, Ropner & Co.
26 June	Bertha	Steamship	Messrs. Backhouse & Dixon	Middlesbrough	United Kingdom	For J. P. Hornung.
26 June	Derwent	Steamship	Messrs. Gilbert & Cooper	Hull	United Kingdom	For Messrs. J. Dunkerley & Co.
26 June	Lima	Steamship	Messrs. Thomas Wingate & Son	Whiteinch	United Kingdom	For Pacific Steam Navigation Company.
27 June	Nizam	Steamship	Messrs. William Denny & Bros.	Dumbarton	United Kingdom	For P&O
28 June	Elysia	Steamship	Messrs. John Elder & Co	Fairfield	United Kingdom	For Anchor Line Steamship Company.
28 June	Ryde	Steamship	John White	Cowes	United Kingdom	For Southsea and Isle of Wight Steam Ferry Co.
June	Blanche	Schooner	David Banks & Co.	Plymouth	United Kingdom	For J. Westcott & Co.
June	Illinois	Pennsylvania-class steamship	William Cramp & Sons	Philadelphia, Pennsylvania	United States	For American Steamship Company.
1 July	Libonena	Steamship		Fiume	Austria-Hungary	For Österreichischer Lloyd.
5 July	Alpha	Sternwheeler			Canada	For J. W. McLane.
5 July	Czarevna	Steam yacht	Earle's Shipbuilding Co.	Hull	United Kingdom	For Alexander II.
10 July	City of Manchester	Steamship	Messrs. Barclay, Curle & Co.	Stobcross	United Kingdom	For Calcutta Line.
12 July	Almeida Garrett	Steamship	Messrs. J. & R. Swan	Dumbarton	United Kingdom	For Progresso Maritimo do Porto.
12 July	Trajano	Cruiser	Arsenal de Marina da Corte	Rio de Janeiro	Brazil	For Imperial Brazilian Navy.
14 July	Bordelaise	Steamship	J. G. Lawrie	Glasgow	United Kingdom	For private owner.
16 July	Faleme	Steamship	Messrs. J. & R. Swan	Dumbarton	United Kingdom	For Messrs. Jamed F. Hutton & Co.
19 July	Mabel	Steamship	Messrs. Charles Hill & Sons	Bristol	United Kingdom	For private owner.
26 July	Bride	Steamship	Robert Thompson Jr.	Sunderland	United Kingdom	For Adam & Co.
26 July	Cæsarea	Steamship	Messrs. Schlesinger, Davis & Co	Wallsend-on-Tyne	United Kingdom	For Messrs. Hacquoil Bros.
26 July	Chelydra	Steamship	Messrs. Backhouse & Dixon	Middlesbrough	United Kingdom	For private owner.
26 July	Mary Coverdale	Steamship	Messrs. Withy, Aleander & Co	Middleton	United Kingdom	For John Coverdale and partners.
26 July	Sophie Jobson	Steamship	Davison & Stokoe	Sunderland	United Kingdom	For E. S. Jobson & Co.
28 July	Magallanes	Corvette	Raenhill & Co.	London	United Kingdom	For Chilean Navy.
30 July	Terrier	Lighter	Messrs. J. & R. Swan	Maryhill	United Kingdom	For Messrs. Burrell & Son.
July	Cathcart	Steamship	Messrs. Henry Murray & Co.	Port Glasgow	United Kingdom	For private owner.
July	New Leader	Schooner	Mr. Bisson	Jersey	(United Kingdom of Great Britain and Ireland) Jersey	For Thomas Jeune.
2 August	Bloodhound	Whaler	Stephens & Sons	Dundee	United Kingdom	For Walter B. Grieve.
7 August	Paragon	Schooner	Messrs. Carneggie & Matthew	Peterhead	United Kingdom	For Mr. Kidd.
8 August	Cygne	Cygne-class wheeled aviso	Jollet & Babin	Nantes	France	For French Navy
9 August	Milford	Paddle steamer	William Simons and Company	Renfrew	United Kingdom	For Great Western Railway.
9 August	Thales	Steamship	Messrs. Hall, Russell & Co.	Aberdeen	United Kingdom	For Messrs. Lamport & Holt.
11 August	Baron Blantyre	Full-rigged ship	William Watson	Pallion	United Kingdom	For James MacCunn & Co.
11 August	Shamrock	Tender	Messrs. M. Pearse & Co	Stockton-on-Tees	United Kingdom	For British Government.
12 August	Ethiopia	Steamship	Messrs. Alexander Stephen & Sons	Linthouse	United Kingdom	For Anchor Line.
12 August	Heatherbell	Schooner	Williams	Cardigan	United Kingdom	For Mr. Davies and others.
12 August	Ichang	Paddle steamer	Messrs. A. & J. Inglis	Pointhouse	United Kingdom	For private owner.
12 August	Mongol	Steamship	Messrs. Dobie & Co.	Govan	United Kingdom	For Messrs. James Howden & Co.
12 August	Zorilla	Steamship	Messrs. Bowdler & Chaffer	Seacombe	United Kingdom	For Messrs. J. Glynn & Co.
13 August	North	Steamship	Messrs. Aitken & Mansel	Whiteinch	United Kingdom	For Sr. Mendez.
14 August	Paragua	Steamship	Messrs. Wingate	Whiteinch	United Kingdom	For Messrs. Ker, Bolton & Co.
22 August	Arnao	Steamship	Messrs. Cunliffe & Dunlop	Port Glasgow	United Kingdom	For Royal Asturienne Mining Co.
22 August	Brest	Steamship	Messrs. Blackwood & Gordon	Port Glasgow	United Kingdom	For Cunard Line.
23 August	Peronelle	Lifeship	Mr. Luke	Itchen Ferry	United Kingdom	For Hans Busk. Carried two lifeboats.
26 August	Amzone	Merchantman	Messrs. John Reid & Co.	Port Glasgow	United Kingdom	For Messrs. W. Battersby & Co.
26 August	Ben Cruachan	Merchantman	Messrs. Barclay, Curle & Co.	Stobcross	United Kingdom	For Messrs. Watson Bros. and others.
26 August	Romeo	Steamship	Messrs. M'Kellar, M'Millan & Co.	Dumbarton	United Kingdom	For Messrs. Shaw, Walker & Co.
26 August	Schiller	Ocean liner	Robert Napier and Sons	Glasgow	United Kingdom	For German Transatlantic Steam Navigation Line.
26 August	Not named	Steamship	Messrs. M'Fadyen & Co.	Port Glasgow	United Kingdom	For J. Wilson.
27 August	Albatross	Fantome-class sloop		Chatham Dockyard	United Kingdom	For Royal Navy.
August	Sleipner	Steamship	W. Watson	Sunderland	United Kingdom	For Swedish Steam Navigation Co.
1 September	Dauntless	fishing vessel	S. Allerton	Lowestoft	United Kingdom	For Messrs. Porter & Butcher.
1 September	Scheme	Fishing vessel	S. Allerton	Lowestoft	United Kingdom	For Messrs. Littlewood & Dance.
6 September	Pansy	Steamship	Messrs. Turnbull & Son	Whitby	United Kingdom	For private owner.
6 September	Primrose	Steamship	Messrs. R. Irvine & Co.	West Hartlepool	United Kingdom	For Messrs. Cory, Lohden & Co.
6 September	Samuel Plimsoll	Merchantman		Aberdeen	United Kingdom	For Messrs. George Thompson Jr., & Co
8 September	Duke of Palmella	Yacht	Michael Ratsey	Cowes	United Kingdom	For private owner.
8 September	Orient	Steamship	Messrs. Richardson, Duck & Co.	Stockton-on-Tees	United Kingdom	For James Taylor.
9 September	Carnforth	Steamship	Messrs. John Fullarton & Co.	Merksworth	United Kingdom	For M. J. Wilson.
9 September	Nurnberg	Steamship	Robert Steele & Company	Greenock	United Kingdom	For the Norddeutscher Lloyd.
10 September	Shah	Frigate		Portsmouth Dockyard	United Kingdom	For Royal Navy.
11 September	Delambro	Steamship	Messrs. William Hamilton & Son	Port Glasgow	United Kingdom	For Messrs. Lamport & Holt.
13 September	Dee	Steamship	Messrs. John Humphrey & Co.	Aberdeen	United Kingdom	For Messrs. Adam & Co.
18 September	Columbus	Steamship	William Cramp & Sons	Philadelphia, Pennsylvania	United States	William P. Clyde & Co.
18 September	Swatara	Sloop-of-war	New York Navy Yard	New York	United States	For United States Navy.
20 September	Byscaim	Steamship	Messrs. Joseph Eltringham	South Shields	United Kingdom	For Messrs. H. E. Moss.
20 September	Hellespont	Steamship	Messrs. Raylton & Dixon	Middlesbrough	United Kingdom	For private owner.
22 September	Franconia	Steamship	Messrs. Caird & Co.	Greenock	United Kingdom	For Hamburg-Amerikanische Packetfahrt-Actien-Gesellschaft.
23 September	Barbara Taylow	Schooner	Tay Shipbuilding Co.	Dundee	United Kingdom	For private owners.
23 September	Kaffir	Steamship	Mr. Key	Kirkcaldy	United Kingdom	For Union Steamship Co.
23 September	Loch Maree	Clipper	Messrs. Barclay, Curle & Co.	Whiteinch	United Kingdom	For Glasgow Shipping Co.
24 September	Hohenstaufen	Steamship	Earle's Shipbuilding and Engineering Co.	Hull	United Kingdom	For Norddeutscher Lloyd.
24 September	Knowsley Hall	Merchantman	Messrs. R. & J. Evasn & Co.	Liverpool	United Kingdom	For Robert Alexander.
24 September	Thomas S. Negus	Pilot boat	C. & R. Poillon	Brooklyn, New York	United States	For New Jersey Pilots.
25 September	Gareloch	Merchantman	Messrs. Dobie & Co.	Govan	United Kingdom	For private owner.
Unknown date	Star	Paddle tug	James Beeching	Great Yarmouth	United Kingdom	For Great Yarmouth 'Star' Steam Tug Co. Ltd.
September	Cyrene	Barque	Richard Thompson	Sunderland	United Kingdom	For G. Foreman.
September	Sea Bird	Schooner	Charles W. Aubin	Jersey	(United Kingdom of Great Britain and Ireland) Jersey	For Fraser Renouf.
1 October	Thomas F. Brady	Galway hooker		Boffin Island	United Kingdom	For J. M'Cormack.
2 October	General-Admiral	General-Admiral-class cruiser	Sredne-Nevskiy Shipyard	Saint Petersburg	Russia	For Imperial Russian Navy.
4 October	Eden	Steamship	Irrawaddy, Flotilla, and Burgee Steam Navigation Company (Limited)	Dalla	Burma	For Irrawaddy, Flotilla, and Burgee Steam Navigation Company (Limited).
6 October	Ava	Steamship	Messrs. William Denny & Bros.	Dumbarton	United Kingdom	For British India Steam Navigation Company (Limited).
6 October	Hankow	Steamship	Messrs. Watts, Milburn & Co.	Newcastle upon Tyne	United Kingdom	For private owner.
7 October	Bulldog	Lighter	Messrs. J. & R. Swan	Dumbartonb	United Kingdom	For Messrs. Burrell & Son.
7 October	Don	Steamship	Messrs. Hall & Co.	Aberdeen	United Kingdom	For J. B. Adam and others.
8 October	Zelda	Steamship	Messrs. Bowdler & Chaffer	Seacombe	United Kingdom	For Messrs. J. Glynn & Sons.
9 October	Duke of Buccleuch	Steamship	Barrow Ship Building Co. Ltd.	Barrow-in-Furness	United Kingdom	For Easter Steam Ship Co. Ltd.
10 October	Lady Downshire	Steamship	Messrs. M'Fayden & Co.	Port Glasgow	United Kingdom	For East Downshire Steamship Co.
10 October	Navarino	Steamship	Earle's Shipbuilding and Engineering Co.	Hull	United Kingdom	For Wilson Line.
10 October	Warkworth	Steamship	Messrs. M'Fayden & Co.	Port Glasgow	United Kingdom	For A. C. Colvill.
11 October	City of Carthage	Steamship	Messrs. Charles Connell & Co.	Whiteinch	United Kingdom	For Messrs. George Smith & Sons.
11 October	Julian de Zuleta	Steamship	Messrs. Cunliffe & Dunlop	Port Glasgow	United Kingdom	For Sr. Don Julian de Zuleta.
15 October	Corregidor	Steamship	Messrs. A. & J. Inglis	Pointhouse	United Kingdom	For private owner.
18 October	Gloamin	Steamship	Messrs. Hall, Russell & Co.	Aberdeen	United Kingdom	For Messrs. Mudie.
21 October	Thomasina MacLellan	East Indiaman	Messrs. Archibald M'Millan & Son	Dumbarton	United Kingdom	For Messrs. Thomson & Gray.
22 October	Cornwall	Steamship	Messrs. Richardson, Duck & Co.	Stockton-on-Tees	United Kingdom	For Great Western Steamship Line.
22 October	Herder	Steamship	Messrs. Alexander Stephen & Sons	Linthouse	United Kingdom	For New Dutch Transatlantic Co.
23 October	Glengarry	Steamship	Royden & Sons	Liverpool	United Kingdom	For private owner. Collided with the Mersey Flats Atlas and Industry on being launched, sinking Industry and severely damaging Atlas.
25 October	Friedland	Ironclad	Arsenal de Lorient	Lorient	France	For French Navy.
1 November	Egeria	Fantome-class sloop		Pembroke Dockyard	United Kingdom	For Royal Navy.
5 November	City Ice Boat No. 3	Icebreaker	Wood, Dialogue & Co	Camden, New Jersey	United States	For City of Philadelphia.
6 November	Southsea	Steamship	Stephen Lampard	Portsmouth	United Kingdom	For Southsea and Ryde Steam Ferry Company.
8 November	Alexander Pirie	Steamship	Messrs. Hall & Sons	Aberdeen	United Kingdom	For Aberdeen, Newcastle & Hull Steam Co.
8 November	Flying Fish	Fantome-class sloop		Chatham Dockyard	United Kingdom	For Royal Navy.
8 November	Hochung	Steamship	Messrs. Bowdler, Chaffer & Co.	Seacombe	United Kingdom	For Messrs. Matheson & Co., or China Merchants Steam Navigation Company.
8 November	Loch Ard	Clipper	Charles Connell and Company	Scotstoun	United Kingdom	For General Shipping Co.
12 November	Paraná	Gunboat	Laird Brothers	Birkenhead	United Kingdom	For Argentine Navy.
13 November	Alarm	Torpedo boat	New York Navy Yard	New York City	United States	For United States Navy.
20 November	Aurora	Aurora-class corvette	Stabilimento Tecnico Triestino	Trieste	Austria-Hungary	For Austro-Hungarian Navy.
20 November	Blenheim	Steamship	Messrs. M. Pearse & Co.	Stockton-on-Tees	United Kingdom	For Messrs. John Holman & Sons.
20 November	Hesperus	Clipper	Robert Steele	Glasgow	United Kingdom	For Orient Line.
20 November	Pearl	Yawl	Messrs. Camper & Nicholson	Gosport	United Kingdom	For private owner.
20 November	Sappho	Fantome-class sloop	Wigram & Sons	Blackwall	United Kingdom	For Royal Navy.
22 November	Dominion	Steamship	Messrs. Archibale M'Millan & Sons	Dumbarton	United Kingdom	For Mississippi & Dominion Steamship Company (Limited).
22 November	Honfleur	Passenger / cargo ship	Aitken & Mansel	Glasgow	United Kingdom	For London and South Western Railway.
22 November	Preussen	Preussen-class ironclad	AG Vulcan	Stettin	Germany	For Kaiserliche Marine.
24 November	Beta	Steamship	Messrs. Aitken & Mansel	Whiteinch	United Kingdom	For Cunard Line.
24 November	MacCallum More	Full-rigged ship	Messrs. Robert Duncan & Co.	Port Glasgow	United Kingdom	For John Potter.
November	Commerce	Ketch	David Banks & Co.	Plymouth	United Kingdom	For Thomas Harvey.
November	Émeraude	Flotilla craft (schooner)	Jollet & Babin	Nantes	France	For French Navy
November	Lady Vere de Vere	Barque	Messrs. George Smith & So	Maitland	Dominion of Canada	For private owner.
2 December	Lady Ambrosine	Steamship	Messrs. J. & R. Swan	Dumbarton	United Kingdom	For Western Isles Steam Packet Company.
3 December	Richelieu	Central battery ironclad	Arsenal de Toulon	Toulon	France	For French Navy.
4 December	Ben Voirlich	East Indiaman	Messrs. Barclay, Curle & Co.	Stobcross	United Kingdom	For Messrs. Watson Bros.
4 December	Onward	Humber keel	Joseph Burton	Selby	United Kingdom	For J. Hunter.
5 December	Ballochmyle	Full-rigged ship	William Watson	Sunderland	United Kingdom	For McKellar & Co.
6 December	Culmore	Steamship	Messrs. Bowdler & Chaffer	Seacombe	United Kingdom	For Messrs. R. T. Smyth & Co.
6 December	Iberia	Steamship	John Elder & Company	Fairfield	United Kingdom	For Pacific Steam Navigation Company.
6 December	John Kerr	Merchantman	Messrs. John Reid & Co.	Greenock	United Kingdom	For Messrs. Abram Lyle & Sons.
6 December	Jupiter	Smack	Outwin	Goole	United Kingdom	For Mr. Holmes.
6 December	Midland	Steamship	Messrs. W. Simons & Co.	Renfrew	United Kingdom	For Messrs. R. Henderson & Son.
11 December	Ilha D'Agoa	Fishing smack	E. Robertson	Ipswich	United Kingdom	For private owner.
17 December	Hebe	Schooner	Messrs. Barr & Shearer	Ardrossan	United Kingdom	For Messrs. Bain & Johnston.
18 December	Agnes Cairns	Schooner	Whitehead	Limekilns	United Kingdom	For James Cairns.
18 December	Leonor	Steamship	Messrs. Hall, Russell & Co.	Aberdeen	United Kingdom	For Messrs. Morrison & Co.
18 December	Porteous	Whaler	Messrs. Alexander Stephen & Son	Dundee	United Kingdom	For private owner.
20 December	Montgomeryshire	Steamship	London and Glasgow Engineering and Iron Shipbuilding Company	Glasgow	United Kingdom	For Messrs. Jenkins & Co.
20 December	Paouting	Steamship	Messrs. John Elder & Co.	Fairfield	United Kingdom	For Messrs. Baring Bros & C0.
22 December	Ayacucho	Steamship	Messrs. Thomas Wingate & Co.	Whiteinch	United Kingdom	For Pacific Steam Navigation Company.
22 December	Irrawaddy	Steamship	Messrs. William Denny & Bros.	Dumbarton	United Kingdom	For Messrs. P. Henderson & Co.
23 December	Marajo	Paddle steamer	Messrs. Laird	Birkenhead	United Kingdom	For private owner.
23 December	Yuyuen	Haian-class frigate	Kiangnan Arsenal	Jiangnan Shipyard	China	For Imperial Chinese Navy.
24 December	Oder	Steamship	Messrs. Caird & Co.	Greenock	United Kingdom	For Norddeutsche Lloyd.
30 December	Hankow	Paddle Steamer	A. & J. Inglis	Pointhouse	United Kingdom	For China Navigation Company.
December	Brestois	Steamship	M'Kellar, M'Millan & Co.	Dumbarton	United Kingdom	For Chevoilette Frères.
December	Maputo	Steamship	Messrs. Scott & Co.	Greenock	United Kingdom	For British India Steam Navigation Company.
Unknown date	Adeliza	Merchantman	Richard Thompson	Sunderland	United Kingdom	For G. L. Seed & Co.
Unknown date	Adria	Steamship	Blumer & Co.	Sunderland	United Kingdom	For P&O.
Unknown date	Alabama	Schooner	Mr. Bautier	Jersey	(United Kingdom of Great Britain and Ireland) Jersey	For Thomas DeFaye.
Unknown date	Alegria	Steamship	James Laing	Sunderland	United Kingdom	For Pablo Maria Tintoré & Co.
Unknown date	Anglo-Norman	Thames barge			United Kingdom	For private owner.
Unknown date	Argo	Barque	J. Gardner	North Hylton	United Kingdom	For Messrs. Humble & Co.
Unknown date	Arigna	Schooner	Ratsey	Cowes	United Kingdom	For Mr. Close.
Unknown date	Asia	Passenger ship	M. Simpson	St. Catharines	Canada	For Northwestern Transportation Company.
Unknown date	Aurrera	Steamship	T. R. Oswald & Co.	Sunderland	United Kingdom	For Olano Larrinaga & Co.
Unknown date	Azorian	Steamship	Robert Thompson Jr.	Sunderland	United Kingdom	For H. Collings & Co.
Unknown date	Barita	Merchantman	James Laing	Sunderland	United Kingdom	For Porteous & Senier.
Unknown date	Barossa	Full-rigged ship	William Pile	Sunderland	United Kingdom	For T. B. Walker.
Unknown date	Blackpool	Schooner	Richard Thompson	Sunderland	United Kingdom	For G. L. Seed & Co.
Unknown date	Border Chieftain	Merchantman	William Pile	Sunderland	United Kingdom	For E. Shotton & Co.
Unknown date	Borneo	Steamship	William Pile & Co.	Sunderland	United Kingdom	For J. H. Kelso.
Unknown date	Borrowdale	Merchantman	G. Short	Sunderland	United Kingdom	For Milburn Bros.
Unknown date	Brabant	Cargo liner	James Laing	Sunderland	United Kingdom	For John Ryde & Co.
Unknown date	Carisbrooke	Merchantman	Davison & Stokoe	Sunderland	United Kingdom	For G. D. Dale & Co.
Unknown date	Carlotta	Merchantman	Blumer & Co.	Sunderland	United Kingdom	For Chapman & Staniland.
Unknown date	Catherine Marden	Schooner	N. Gibbon	South Hylton	United Kingdom	For William Marden.
Unknown date	Cawdor Castle	Steamship	Messrs. J. & G. Thomson	Glasgow	United Kingdom	For Castle Line.
Unknown date	Chambeze	Merchantman	G. Short	Sunderland	United Kingdom	For G. J. Hay.
Unknown date	Chancellor	Merchantman	James Laing	Sunderland	United Kingdom	For T. & J. Harrison.
Unknown date	Clarissa	Cutter	Mr. Fyfe	Fairlie	United Kingdom	For Lord Henry Lennox.
Unknown date	City of Dublin	Steamship	Robert Thompson	Sunderland	United Kingdom	For M. Murphy.
Unknown date	City of Waco	Passenger / cargo ship	John Roach & Sons	Chester, Pennsylvania	United States	For Mallory Line.
Unknown date	Cornwall	Merchantman	G. Short	Sunderland	United Kingdom	For H. T. Morton.
Unknown date	Crownthorpe	Full-rigged ship	Robert Thompson Jr.	Sunderland	United Kingdom	For Livingstone & Briggs.
Unknown date	Dafila	Steamship	James Laing	Sunderland	United Kingdom	For Porteous & Senier.
Unknown date	Daniel Lyons	Schooner	George Goble	Oswego, New York	United States	For private owner.
Unknown date	Dora	Collier	Blumer & Co.	Sunderland	United Kingdom	For J. D. Hill & Co.
Unknown date	Doris	Schooner	J. Crown	Sunderland	United Kingdom	For L. Lewis.
Unknown date	Echo	Merchantman	William Pile	Sunderland	United Kingdom	For Hudig & Blockhuyzen.
Unknown date	Edmund Richardson	Merchantman	William Pickersgill	Sunderland	United Kingdom	For T. Seed.
Unknown date	Elizabeth Richardson	Merchantman	William Pickersgill	Sunderland	United Kingdom	For Fleetwood Shipping Co. Ltd.
Unknown date	Emma Sims	Merchantman	William Richardson	North Hylton	United Kingdom	For Sims, Triplett & Co.
Unknown date	Enterprise	Tug	William Allsup	Preston	United Kingdom	For Robert Smith.
Unknown date	Faith	Merchantman	J. Gardner	North Hylton	United Kingdom	For J. Smith & Co.
Unknown date	Fulgerul	Gunboat	Forges et Chantiers de la Mediteranée	Toulon	France	For Romanian Navy.
Unknown date	Gardshill	Merchantman	Blumer & Co	Sunderland	United Kingdom	For River Parana Steam Ship Co. Ltd.
Unknown date	George S. Boutwell	Steamship	David Bell	Buffalo, New York	United States	For United States Revenue Cutter Service.
Unknown date	G. E. Wood	Merchantman	Joseph L. Thompson	Sunderland	United Kingdom	For J. Marychurch & Co.
Unknown date	Gila	Sternwheeler	Patrick Henry Tiernan	San Francisco, California	United States	For Colorado Steam Navigation Company.
Unknown date	Glenisla	Merchantman	Davison & Stokoe	Sunderland	United Kingdom	For W. Thorburn.
Unknown date	Governor Grover	Sternwheeler		Portland, Oregon	United States	For Willamette River Navigation Co.
Unknown date	Grace A. Channon	Schooner	W. S. Ellenwood & Co.	East Saginaw, Michigan	United States	For Henry Channon.
Unknown date	Gurturbay	Merchantman	William Doxford	Sunderland	United Kingdom	For Mr. Gurturbay.
Unknown date	Hampton	Merchantman	Blumer & Co	Sunderland	United Kingdom	For Commercial Steam Ship Co.
Unknown date	Helen Christine	Merchantman	Alfred Simey & Co.	Sunderland	United Kingdom	For F. Crawshay.
Unknown date	Herminia	Merchantman	Alfred Simey & Co.	Sunderland	United Kingdom	For private owner.
Unknown date	Imbro	Merchantman	Mounsey & Foster	Sunderland	United Kingdom	For Pinkney & Sons.
Unknown date	Indiana	Schooner	William Pickersgill	Sunderland	United Kingdom	For Fleetwood Shipping Co. Ltd.
Unknown date	John Wells	Merchantman	Davison & Stokoe	Sunderland	United Kingdom	For Goole Steamship Co. Ltd.
Unknown date	Kenmure Castle	Steamship	J Softley & Co	South Shields	United Kingdom	For Messrs T. Skinner and Co.
Unknown date	Kepler	Merchantman	Bartram, Haswell & Co.	Sunderland	United Kingdom	For W. Wilkie.
Unknown date	Khiva	Cargo liner	James Laing	Sunderland	United Kingdom	For P&O
Unknown date	Kismet	Yacht			United Kingdom	For C. P. Clayton.
Unknown date	Knickerbocker	Tug	Neafie & Levy	Philadelphia, Pennsylvania	United States	For private owner.
Unknown date	Kolga	Merchantman	Bartram, Haswell & Co.	Sunderland	United Kingdom	For J. Frensburg, H. Friis & H. Ramsten.
Unknown date	Kong Sverre	Steamship		River Tees	United Kingdom	For private owner.
Unknown date	Kron Prinz	Steamship	Short Bros.	Sunderland	United Kingdom	For J. H. Lorentzen & Co.
Unknown date	Lady Catherine	Merchantman	Short Bros.	Sunderland	United Kingdom	For Earl of Durham.
Unknown date	Lancelot	Steamship	Osbourne, Graham & Co.	Sunderland	United Kingdom	For A. McMillan & Sons.
Unknown date	Little Nell	Fishing trawler	John Banks Jr.	Kilpin Pike	United Kingdom	For John Cable.
Unknown date	Lolland	Merchantman	Osbourne, Graham & Co	Sunderland	United Kingdom	For Det Lollandske Engelske Dampskibs Selskab.
Unknown date	Lucky Vick	Merchantman	William Pickersgill	Sunderland	United Kingdom	For T. Seed.
Unknown date	Magna Charta	Paddle steamer	Charlton & Co. Ltd.	Grimsby	United Kingdom	For Manchester, Sheffield and Lincolnshire Railway.
Unknown date	Manhattan	Tug	Charles Weidener	Chester, Pennsylvania	United States	For United States Revenue Cutter Service.
Unknown date	Marie Lorentzen	Merchantman	G. Short	Sunderland	United Kingdom	For J. H. Lorentzen & Co.
Unknown date	Mary	Mersey flat	Anderson	Tranmere, Merseyside	United Kingdom	For Allan, Bros. & Co. Ltd.
Unknown date	May Queen	Barque	N. Gibbon	South Hylton	United Kingdom	For J. Haddow.
Unknown date	Mecca	Steamship	Messrs. A. & J. Inglis	Pointhouse	United Kingdom	For .
Unknown date	Medina	Merchantman	Osbourne, Graham & Co.	Sunderland	United Kingdom	For J. Pender.
Unknown date	Meggie Dixon	Barque	J. Gardner	Sunderland	United Kingdom	For Richardson & Co.
Unknown date	Meiji Maru	Lighthouse tender	Robert Napier and Sons	Glasgow	United Kingdom	For Imperial Japanese Government.
Unknown date	Morehampton	Merchantman	Osbourne, Graham & Co.	Sunderland	United Kingdom	For W. D. Smith.
Unknown date	Namaqua	Merchantman	T. R. Oswald	Sunderland	United Kingdom	For Union Steamship Co. Ltd.
Unknown date	Nereid	Merchantman	William Doxford	Sunderland	United Kingdom	For Kirby & Gillies.
Unknown date	Neva	Cutter		Fairlie	United Kingdom	For Mr. Holmes-Kerr.
Unknown date	Nordstjernen	Merchantman	Bartram, Haswell & Co	Sunderland	United Kingdom	For Norden Steam Shipping Co.
Unknown date	Norval	Full-rigged ship	W. Watson	Sunderland	United Kingdom	For Baine & Johnston.
Unknown date	Number Eight	Steamship	Thomas Brassey & Co.	Birkenhead	United Kingdom	For Dublin Port and Docks board.
Unknown date	Number Seven	Steamship	Thomas Brassey & Co.	Birkenhead	United Kingdom	For Dublin Port and Docks board.
Unknown date	Number Six	Steamship	Thomas Brassey & Co.	Birkenhead	United Kingdom	For Dublin Port and Docks board.
Unknown date	Orwell	Paddle steamer	Lewis and Stockwell	London	United Kingdom	For Great Eastern Railway.
Unknown date	Ottowa	Steamship	Joseph L. Thompson	Sunderland	United Kingdom	For J. H. W. Culliford.
Unknown date	Ovington	Merchantman	Osbourne, Graham & Co.	Sunderland	United Kingdom	For Humble & Thompson.
Unknown date	Parkend	Ketch	William Bayley & Sons	Ipswich	United Kingdom	For James W. Sully.
Unknown date	Pauline	Merchantman	W. Richardson	Sunderland	United Kingdom	For Beckwith & Co.
Unknown date	Pekin	Paddle steamer	Messrs. A. & J. Inglis	Pointhouse	United Kingdom	For private ownber.
Unknown date	Plover	Steamship	Blake & Co.	Northfleet	United Kingdom	For William Liddel.
Unknown date	Puno	Steamship			United Kingdom	For Pacific Steam Navigation Company.
Unknown date	Rakaia	Full-rigged ship	Blumer & Co.	Sunderland	United Kingdom	For The New Zealand Shipping Co. Ltd.
Unknown date	Rap	Torpedo boat	John I. Thorneycroft & Company	Chiswick	United Kingdom	For Royal Norwegian Navy.
Unknown date	Roderick Dhu	Merchantman	Mounsey & Foster	Sunderland	United Kingdom	For Williamson, Milligan & Co.
Unknown date	Roderick Hay	Barque	N. Gibbon	South Hylton	United Kingdom	For P. A. Nicolson.
Unknown date	Shady Side	Steamboat		Bulls Ferry, New Jersey	United States	For Morrisania Steamboat Company.
Unknown date	Santander	Merchantman	Mounsey & Foster	Sunderland	United Kingdom	For Johnson & Co.
Unknown date	Sappho	Thames barge			United Kingdom	For private owner.
Unknown date	Shanghai	Paddle steamer	Messrs. A. & J. Inglis	Pointhouse	United Kingdom	For private owner.
Unknown date	Shing-King	Paddle steamer	Messrs. A. & J. Inglis	Pointhouse	United Kingdom	For private owner.
Unknown date	Sir Francis Drake	Paddle tender	William Allsup	Preston	United Kingdom	For West Cornwall Railway & Dock Co.
Unknown date	Sorromostro	Steamship	T. R. Oswald	Sunderland	United Kingdom	For J. H. Wilson .
Unknown date	Sport	Tug	Wyandotte Iron Shipbuilding Works	Wyandotte, Michigan	United States	For Eber Brock Ward.
Unknown date	Stag	Merchantman	A. Simey & Co.	Sunderland	United Kingdom	For C. Lohden.
Unknown date	St. Peter	Schooner			United States	for private owner.
Unknown date	St. Thomas	Steamship			United Kingdom	For West Indian and Pacific Steamship Co.
Unknown date	Supernal	Merchantman	Bartram, Haswell & Co.	Sunderland	United Kingdom	For James Westoll & Co.
Unknown date	Thetis	Schooner	Joseph & Nicholas Butson	Bodinnick or Polruan	United Kingdom	For Thomas Pearce.
Unknown date	Thomas C. Seed	Brigantine	William Pickersgill	Sunderland	United Kingdom	For T. Seed.
Unknown date	Thomas Dugdale	Paddle steamer	A. Leslie and Company	Newcastle upon Tyne	United Kingdom	For Lancashire and Yorkshire Railway.
Unknown date	Tolten	Merchantman		Greenwich	United Kingdom	For Chilean Government.
Unknown date	Triano	Merchantman	A. Simey & Co.	Sunderland	United Kingdom	For private owner.
Unknown date	Umkomanzi	Barque	J. Crown	Sunderland	United Kingdom	For J. T. Rennie.
Unknown date	Vanora	Barque	J. Crown	Sunderland	United Kingdom	For Lumsdon & Byer.
Unknown date	Vindomora	Merchantman	Joseph L. Thompson	Sunderland	United Kingdom	For Bell, Symonds & Co.
Unknown date	Vidar	Steamship	Earle's Shipbuilding	Hull	United Kingdom	For Ang Fartyg.
Unknown date	Vienna	Steamship	Quale and Martin	Cleveland, Ohio	United States	For Cleveland Transportation Company.
Unknown date	Vulkan	Collier	James Laing	Sunderland	United Kingdom	For Hamburg-Amerikanische Packetfahrt-Actien-Gesellschaft .
Unknown date	Washington	Merchantman	T. R. Oswald	Sunderland	United Kingdom	For Stettin-Amerikanische Dampfschiffahrts AG.
Unknown date	Wolcott	Steamship	Risden Iron Works	San Francisco, California	United Kingdom	For United States Revenue Cutter Service.
Unknown date	Yen-tai	Merchantman	William Doxford	Sunderland	United Kingdom	For E. M. Bussche.
Unknown date	Yukon	Schooner		Kennebunk, Maine	United States	For United States Coast Survey.
Unknown date	Zebrina	Sailing barge		Whitstable	United Kingdom	For private owner.
Unknown date	Zeus	Steamship	William Doxford	Sunderland	United Kingdom	For Olano, Larrinaga & Co.
