= HMS Daring =

Seven vessels of the British Royal Navy have been named HMS Daring.

- HMS Daring (1804), a 12-gun Archer-class gun-brig launched in 1804 and destroyed after running aground in 1813.
- HMS Daring (1844), a 12-gun brig launched in 1844 and broken up in 1864.
- HMS Daring (1874), a Fantome-class 4-gun composite sloop launched in 1874 and broken up in 1889.
- HMS Daring (1893), a Daring-class destroyer launched in 1893 and broken up in 1912.
- HMS Daring, an Laforey-class destroyer, renamed Lance in 1913, a year before launch.
- HMS Daring, a planned Danae-class cruiser ordered in March 1918, but cancelled in November the same year.
- HMS Daring (H16), a D-class destroyer launched in 1932 and sunk in 1940.
- HMS Daring (D05), a Daring-class destroyer launched in 1949 and broken up in 1971.
- HMS Daring (D32), a Type 45 destroyer launched on 1 February 2006.
