= List of shipwrecks in May 1886 =

The list of shipwrecks in May 1886 includes ships sunk, foundered, grounded, or otherwise lost during May 1886.

== 3 May ==
List of shipwrecks: 3 May 1886
Ship	State	Description
Mary, Queen of the Sea	United Kingdom	After severe gale damage on 28 April, the schooner suffered a fire and was disabled. She was abandoned and sank in the Atlantic Ocean (41°20′N 45°00′W). Her crew were rescued by the steamship British Princess (United Kingdom). Mary, Queen of the Sea was on a voyage from Barbados to Saint John's, Newfoundland Colony.

== 4 May ==
List of shipwrecks: 4 May 1886
Ship	State	Description
A. N. Clark	United States	The schooner sank off the Bass Rocks, off the coast of Massachusetts. Her crew were rescued.

== 5 May ==
List of shipwrecks: 5 May 1886
Ship	State	Description
Hankow	United Kingdom	The steamship ran aground in Lake Timsah. She was on a voyage from Cardiff, Glamorgan to Bombay, India. She was later refloated and resumed her voyage.
Monitor	United States	The schooner was wrecked at Port May, Newfoundland Colony. Her crew were rescued.

== 6 May ==
List of shipwrecks: 6 May 1886
Ship	State	Description
Ida	United Kingdom	The cutter was run down and sunk off Falmouth, Cornwall by the steamship Martello (United Kingdom) with the loss of a crew member. Survivors were rescued by Martello.

== 7 May ==
List of shipwrecks: 7 May 1886
Ship	State	Description
Lord Derby	United Kingdom	The tug collided with a buoy and sank near Roath, Glamorgan. She was refloated the next day and taken in tow for Cardiff, but sank in the entrance to the East Dock. She was later refloated.
Marabout	United States	The ship was driven ashore at East Marion, New York. She was on a voyage from New York City to Bombay, India. She was later refloated and towed in to New London.
Moretta	United Kingdom	The yacht ran aground on the Brake Sand. She was refloated and taken in to Ramsgate, Kent.

== 9 May ==
List of shipwrecks: 9 May 1886
Ship	State	Description
Henrietta	United States	The schooner stranded at Yarmouth, Nova Scotia, Canada. Her crew were rescued.
Panama	Spain	The steamship was driven ashore at Kilmichael Point, County Wexford, United Kingdom. She was on a voyage from Liverpool, Lancashire, United Kingdom to Havana, Cuba. She was refloated and taken in to Arklow, County Wicklow, United Kingdom.
Progress	United Kingdom	The steamship ran aground in the River Ouse. She was on a voyage from Hamburg, Germany to Goole, Yorkshire. She was refloated on 11 May.
Unnamed	United Kingdom	The coal hulk sank in Gourock Bay.

== 10 May ==
List of shipwrecks: 10 May 1886
Ship	State	Description
Sampson	United Kingdom	The schooner ran aground on the Goodwin Sands, Kent. Her four crew were rescued by the galley punt Siloam (United Kingdom) Samson was on a voyage from Par, Cornwall to Dordrecht, South Holland, Netherlands. She was refloated with assistance from the tug Granville (United Kingdom) but consequently sank.

== 11 May ==
List of shipwrecks: 11 May 1886
Ship	State	Description
Blanche	United Kingdom	The schooner ran aground at the Pigeon House Fort, County Dublin.
Nojake	United Kingdom	The smack was driven ashore and wrecked on Papa Westray, Orkney Islands.

== 13 May ==
List of shipwrecks: 13 May 1886
Ship	State	Description
Agnes Otto, and Fitzjames	United Kingdom	The steamship Fitzjames collided with the steamship Agnes Ottoand sank in the Danube 7 nautical miles (13 km) downstream of Galaţi, Romania. She was on a voyage from Constantinople, Ottoman Empire to Galaţi. Agnes Otto was on a voyage from Brăila, Romania to Cork. She was beached.
Mermaid	United Kingdom	The brig was driven ashore at Donna Nook, Lincolnshire with the loss of two of her crew. One of the crew of the Donna Nook Lifeboat and a civilian died in the attempt to reach the brig. She was on a voyage from Whitstable, Kent to Hartlepool, County Durham.
President	United Kingdom	The ship ran aground off Cardigan. Her three crew were rescued by the Cardigan Lifeboat Lizzie & Charles Leigh Clare ( Royal National Lifeboat Institution). President was later refloated and taken in to Cardigan.

== 15 May ==
List of shipwrecks: 15 May 1886
Ship	State	Description
Break of Day	United Kingdom	The pilot cutter collided with a steamship and sank.
Eliza	United Kingdom	The schooner foundered north of "Gore". Her crew were rescued. She was on a voyage from Cardiff, Glamorgan to Bridgwater, Somerset.
Two unnamed vessels	Germany	The barges sank in the Oder with loss of life.

== 17 May ==
List of shipwrecks: 17 May 1886
Ship	State	Description
Admiral Nelson	United Kingdom	The ship was driven ashore and wrecked at Wallasey, Cheshire. Her crew were rescued. She was on a voyage from "Portelly" to Garston, Lancashire.
Calder	United Kingdom	The steamship was driven ashore was Workington, Cumberland.
Miss Roberts	United Kingdom	The tug sprang a leak and was beached at Sunderland, County Durham.
Unnamed	United Kingdom	The fishing boat foundered off Christchurch, Hampshire. All three crew were rescued by the fishing boat Pride (United Kingdom).
Unnamed	Flag unknown	The cutter was driven ashore in the Humber between Barton-upon-Humber and New Holland, Lincolnshire, United Kingdom. She was found to be carrying smuggled tobacco and was seized by the Coastguard. She was refloated and taken in to Hull, Yorkshire, United Kingdom.

== 18 May ==
List of shipwrecks: 18 May 1886
Ship	State	Description
Catherine	United Kingdom	The sloop sank in the Irish Sea 7 nautical miles (13 km) south east of Point Lynas, Anglesey. Her crew were rescued by the steamship Cognac (United Kingdom).
Lady Mulgrave	United Kingdom	The lighter foundered in the North Sea 10 nautical miles (19 km) south west of St. Abbs Head, Berwickshire. Her crew survived. She was on a voyage from Sunderland, County Durham to Aberdeen.

== 20 May ==
List of shipwrecks: 20 May 1886
Ship	State	Description
Joseph Story	United States	The schooner was wrecked at Saint-Pierre, Saint Pierre and Miquelon. Her crew were rescued.

== 23 May ==
List of shipwrecks: 23 May 1886
Ship	State	Description
Veracity	United Kingdom	The schooner collided with the steamship Knight of St. George (United Kingdom) and sank in the English Channel 15 nautical miles (28 km) east of Dungeness, Kent. Her crew were rescued.

== 24 May ==
List of shipwrecks: 24 May 1886
Ship	State	Description
Donegal	United Kingdom	The steamship struck the Bishop Rock, Isles of Scilly and sank. Her crew survived. She was on a voyage from Londonderry to Newport, Monmouthshire.

== 29 May ==
List of shipwrecks: 29 May 1886
Ship	State	Description
Alice	United Kingdom	The steamship was driven ashore at Portpatrick, Wigtownshire.

== 30 May ==
List of shipwrecks: 30 May 1886
Ship	State	Description
Ly-ee-Moon	New South Wales	The steamship was wrecked off Green Cape with the loss of 71 of the 86 people on board. She was on a voyage from Melbourne, Victoria to Sydney.

== Unknown date ==
List of shipwrecks: Unknown date in May 1886
Ship	State	Description
Abertawe	United Kingdom	The dredger was run into by the steamship Volo (Flag unknown) and sank at Swansea, Glamorgan.
Acadia	United States	The steamship foundered in the Atlantic Ocean during a hurricane with the loss of all sixteen crew. She was on a voyage from Jamaica to an American port.
Acadian	France	The brig was driven ashore and wrecked on Miquelon. Her crew were rescued. She was on a voyage from Cádiz, Spain to Saint Pierre and Miquelon.
Adria	India	The steamship was driven wrecked at Pemba. Her crew survived.
HMS Albatross	Royal Navy	The Fantome-class sloop was driven ashore at Hong Kong whilst going to the assistance of Dafila (United Kingdom). She was later refloated.
Amyone	United Kingdom	The barque ran aground at Penarth, Glamorgan. She was refloated on 29 May and resumed her voyage.
Baltic	United Kingdom	The brigantine sank at Havre de Grâce, Seine-Inférieure, France. She was on a voyage from Swansea to Port-Audemer, Eure, France.
Caradoc	United Kingdom	The schooner was driven ashore at Maryport, Cumberland. She was on a voyage from Dublin to Maryport.
Cormorant	United Kingdom	The fishing smack was run down and sunk off the Old Head of Kinsale, County Cork by Madras (United Kingdom). Her crew were rescued.
Dafila	United Kingdom	The ship was driven ashore at Hong Kong. She was later refloated, and was towed in to Haikou, China by HMS Albatross (Royal Navy).
Electra	United Kingdom	The brigantine was holed by the propeller of the steamship Restormel (United Kingdom) and sank at Penarth. Electra was on a voyage from Fécamp, Seine-Inférieureto Cardiff, Glamorgan.
Eliza Francis	United Kingdom	The ship was driven ashore in "Ducas Bay".
Erna	Norway	The steamship ran aground at "Seiro", Denmark. She was later refloated with assistance and taken in to Copenhagen, Denmark.
Ernestine	United Kingdom	The ship was driven ashore at Saugor, India. Her crew were rescued. She subsequently became a wreck.
Florella	Flag unknown	The ship was abandoned in the Atlantic Ocean. Her crew were rescued. She was on a voyage from Mobile, Alabama, United States to Southampton, Hampshire, United Kingdom.
Francisco	Germany	The schooner was driven ashore and wrecked at "Protos".
Friedrich Wilhelm	Germany	The barque ran aground at "Krassebanken", Saltholm, Denmark.
Godolphin	United Kingdom	The ship was severely damaged by fire at Lisbon, Portugal.
Great Britain	United Kingdom	The full-rigged ship caught fire on a voyage from Penarth, Glamorgan to San Francisco, California, United States. She put in to Stanley, Falkland Islands, where she ran aground. Declared beyond economic repair, she was subsequently used as a coal hulk.
Heinrich	Germany	The galiot capsized and sank 7 nautical miles (13 km) south west half west of "Dracko". She was on a voyage from Wolgast to Copenhagen, Denmark.
Herald	United Kingdom	The steamship was run down and sank off Crooked Island, Bahamas by the steamship Stroma (United Kingdom). Her crew were rescued.
Huntley Castle	United Kingdom	The barque was wrecked in a cyclone 7 nautical miles (13 km) off Pondicherry, India. She was on a voyage from Algoa Bay to Madras, India. She was towed in to Madras, where she was condemned.
Ice King	United States	The ship sank at Fourth Point, Netherlands East Indies.
Inversnaid	United Kingdom	The full-rigged ship ran aground at Queenstown, County Cork. She was refloated on 29 May.
Joseph Dexter	United Kingdom	The brigantine was damaged at sea off Portland, Dorset and was beached at Ryde, Isle of Wight. She was on a voyage from Cork to Newcastle upon Tyne, Northumberland.
Lass o'Gowrie	United Kingdom	The tug sank at South Shields, County Durham.
Leucotha	Germany	The brig ran aground at Kastrup, Denmark and became severely leaky. She was on a voyage from Stettin to Tayport, Fife, United Kingdom.
Margaret	United Kingdom	The ship was driven ashore at Deganwy, Caernarfonshire. She was on a voyage from Penmaenmawr, Caernarfonshire to Runcorn, Cheshire.
Margaret and Maria	United Kingdom	The ketch sprang a leak and was abandoned at Wisech Eye, Cambridgeshire. the sole crew member aboard was rescued by the brig Union (United Kingdom). Union was subsequently taken in to Sutton Bridge, Lincolnshire.
Menzaleh	United Kingdom	The steamship was driven ashore at Lyserort, Courland Governorate. She was on a voyage from Eupatoria to Riga, Russia She was later refloated and taken in to Ventava, Courland Governorate.
North Erin	United Kingdom	The steamship was driven ashore at Knock, Isle of Lewis, Outer Hebrides. She was on a voyage from New York to Leith, Lothian. She was refloated on 5 May and taken in to Stornoway, Isle of Lewis.
Palala	United Kingdom	The steamship ran aground on the Kimmeridge Ledge, in the English Channel off the coast of Dorset. She wason a voyage from London to Port Natal, Natal Colony. She subsequently became a wreck.
Perseverance	United Kingdom	The ketch was driven ashore at South Benfleet, Essex. She was on a voyage from Herne Bay, Kent to Grays, Essex.
Pontiac	Flag unknown	The ship was driven ashore in "Small Gattee".
Praesident	Norway	The ship ran aground. She was refloated and taken in to Anjer, Netherlands East Indies in a leaky condition.
Prefet Paul Feart	France	The ship was abandoned in the Atlantic Ocean. She was on a voyage from Port of Spain, Trinidad to the Hampton Roads, Virginia, United States.
Rambler	United Kingdom	The steamship was driven ashore at Domesnes, Russia. She was on a voyage from Riga to London.
Resolve	United Kingdom	The schooner was driven ashore at Leven, Fife.
Rocket	China	The tug sank in the Yangtze.
Royal Saxon	United Kingdom	The ship was driven ashore at Hartland Quay, Cornwall.
Salerno	United Kingdom	The steamship ran aground on the Colorados Reef, off the coast of Cuba. She was refloated a day later and completed her voyage to Belize City, British Honduras, where she arrived on 19 May.
Secret	United Kingdom	The ship was driven ashore at Aberdovey, Merionethshire.
Sir Henry Havelock	United Kingdom	The barque caught fire and sank at "Narrakel", India.
Sophia Joakim	United Kingdom	The ship caught fire on a voyage from Calcutta, India to Muscat, Oman. She put back to Calcutta. The fire was extinguished.
Spark	United Kingdom	The steamship was driven ashore at "Storjungfrun", Sweden. She was later refloated and taken in to Ljusne, Sweden in a waterlogged condition.
Sweet Home	United Kingdom	The fishing boat ran aground in the Barrow Gap, off the coast of Norfolk.
Tizsa	United Kingdom	The steamship collided with the steamship Furnessia in the Clyde at Dumbarton, Dunbartonshire and was severely damaged. She put back to Glasgow, Renfrewshire.
Varuna	United Kingdom	The ship was driven ashore at Diamond Harbour, Hong Kong. She was later refloated and taken in to Diamond Harbour.
Ville de Coulance	United Kingdom	The ship foundered at sea. Her crew were rescued.
Ville de Palerme	France	The steamship was wrecked on Ouessant, Finistère. Her crew were rescued. She was on a voyage from Algiers, Algeria to Havre de Grâce.
Walume	United Kingdom	The schooner was driven ashore at Ballyhalbert, County Down. Her crew were rescued.
Washington	Italy	The barque was driven ashore. She was refloated and taken in to Savannah, Georgia, United States in a severely leaky condition.
No. 88	United Kingdom	The pilot boat collided with the steamship Treneglos (United Kingdom) and sank at Penarth. Her crew were rescued.
