= SMS Nürnberg =

There have been three German cruisers named Nürnberg :

- SMS Nürnberg (1906)
- SMS Nürnberg (1916)
- German cruiser Nürnberg - launched in 1934

== See also ==
- SS Nurnberg - 351-foot steamship that was also rigged for sail, built in 1874
