= Thomas Dugdale =

Thomas Dugdale may refer to:

- Thomas Dugdale, 1st Baron Crathorne (1897–1977), British Conservative Party politician
- Thomas Cantrell Dugdale (1880–1952), British artist
- PS Thomas Dugdale, a paddle steamer passenger vessel
