= List of cruisers of Romania =

This is a list of cruisers operated by the Romanian Navy since its founding in 1860.

== Coastguard cruisers ==
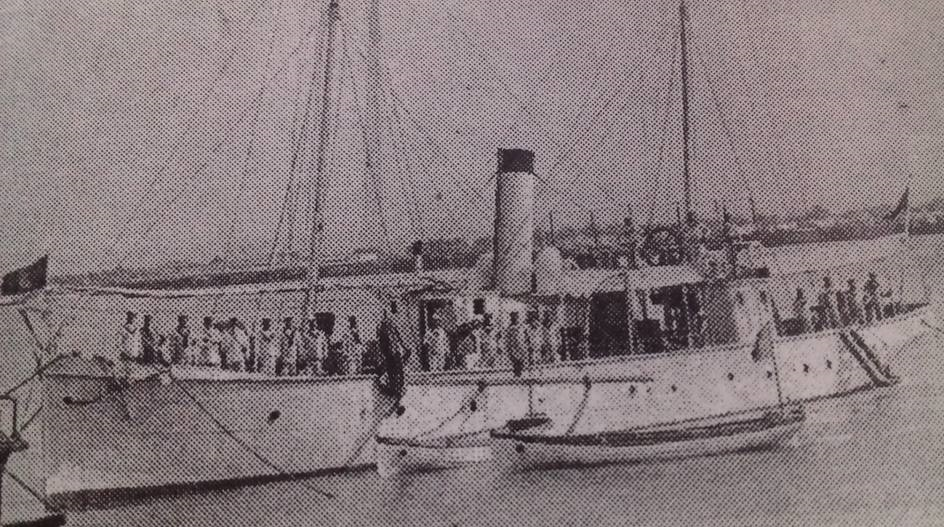
Romanian coastguard cruiser Grivița

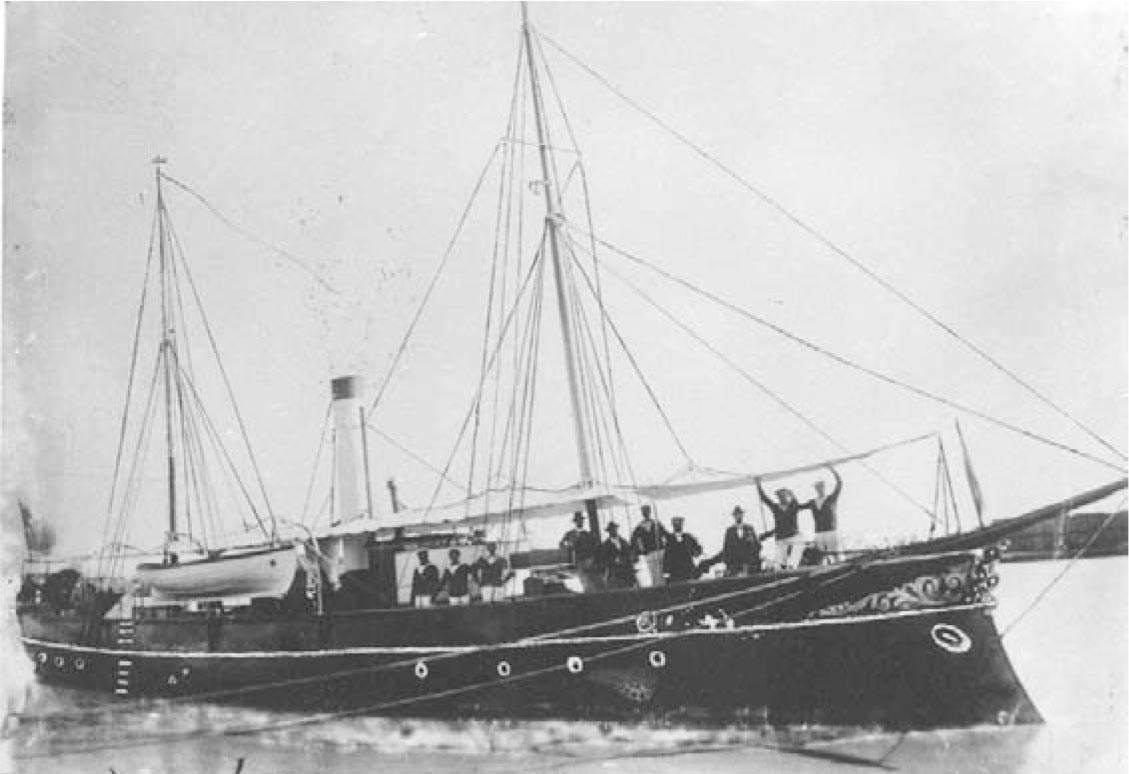
NMS Bistrița

These vessels were essentially large border patrol boats armed with multiple light guns. Five such warships were operated by the Romanian Navy, from 1873 until 1968. The first was named Fulgerul, officially commissioned in 1874. She was followed by the larger Grivița in 1880, and finally by the Bistrița-class of three vessels in 1888.

=== Fulgerul ===
This 85-ton gunboat was the first purpose-built, sea-going warship of the Romanian Navy. She was built in Toulon in 1873 and commissioned in 1874, upon arriving in Romania. Initially, she served in her intended role as a gunboat, being armed with a single 87 mm Krupp gun. As of World War I, however, her armament was changed to one 57 mm gun and one 37 mm gun. She had a top speed of 7.5 knots and a crew of 18. She survived World War II and was only scrapped in 1968.

=== Grivița ===
This vessel was the first warship acquired by Romania after its 1877-1878 war of independence. She was built in 1880 by Stabilimento Tecnico Triestino in Austria-Hungary, being the last warship purchased by Romania before the country's conversion to a Kingdom in 1881. She measured 60.5 meters in length, with a beam of 5.2 meters and a draught of 1.8 meters. She displaced 110 tons standard and 128 tons with a full load of coal, had a crew of 30 men and a top speed of 9 knots, generated by a 180 hp steam engine. She was armed with two 57 mm Nordenfelt guns and two 37 mm 1-pounder guns.

=== Bistrița-class ===
The three 96-ton vessels of this class were named Bistrița, Oltul and Siretul, all bearing the names of Romanian rivers. These vessels measured 30.5 meters in length, with a beam of 4.1 meters and a draught of 1.7 meters. They were built in 1888 by Thames Iron Works in London and each vessel was armed with one 57 mm gun and one 37 mm gun. Crewed by 30 men each, they had a top speed of 13 knots generated by 380 hp steam propulsion, carrying a maximum of 12 tons of coal. All three vessels of this class saw service during the Second World War as river gunboats, being still in service as of 1949.

== Protected cruisers ==
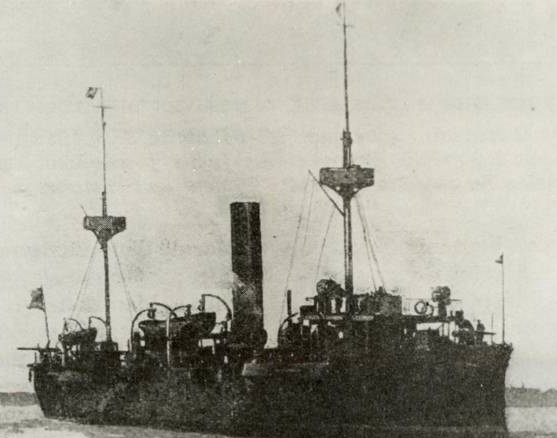
The protected cruiser Elisabeta

Romania had only one protected cruiser, named Elisabeta. She was built by Armstrong Whitworth at Elswick in the United Kingdom in 1887-1888 and rebuilt in 1905. She was armed with four 120 mm naval guns, four 75 mm dual purpose (naval/AA guns) and four 356 mm torpedo tubes. She measured 73 meters in length, with a beam of 10.21 meters and a draught of 3.66 meters. Her displacement amounted to 1,380 tons. She was protected by 44 mm of steel at the ends of the deck and 89 mm amidships. She had a top speed of 17 knots and a crew of 150. Elisabeta was still in use as a barracks ship as of 1929. Notably, she was among the first warships designed by the British naval architect Philip Watts, who would later design the revolutionary battleship HMS Dreadnought.

== Scout cruisers ==
=== Paper projects ===
In 1912, based on the 1912 Romanian naval program which envisioned 6 light cruisers and 12 large destroyers, Vickers offered two protected scout cruiser designs to Romania. The first design, named Design 634, was to displace 3,100 tons and have a top speed of 27 knots. Armament was to consist of six 152 mm guns, six 102 mm guns and two 533 mm deck-mounted torpedo tubes. The second proposal, known as Design 635, was heavier and slower. Designed displacement was to amount to 3,200 tons with a top speed of 24 knots. The six 152 mm guns envisioned by the previous design were replaced by two 190 mm guns. None of these were accepted by Romania, however.

=== Aquila-class ===
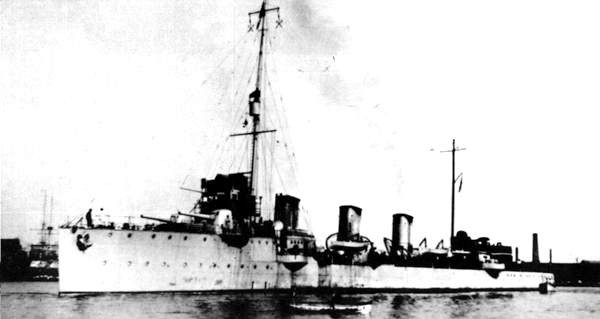
Aquila-class scout cruiser in 1917

In 1913, Romania ordered four large destroyers from the Pattison Shipyard in Naples, Italy. These 1,500-ton vessels were to be armed with three 120 mm naval guns, four 75 mm guns and five torpedo tubes. However, the four warships were requisitioned by Italy in 1915, upon the country's entering into the First World War. In order to outgun the Austro-Hungarian Navy's cruisers, the three designed 120 mm guns were replaced by larger 152 mm guns. Four 76 mm guns were fitted and two twin 457 mm torpedo tubes were mounted on broadsides. Two 6.5 mm machine guns were also fitted. The four vessels were designated as esploratori (scout cruisers) by the Royal Italian Navy. Each cruiser measured 94.7 meters in length, with a beam of 9.5 meters and a draught of 3.6 meters. Power plant consisted of Tosi turbines and five Thornycroft boilers, generating a designed output of 40,000 hp powering two shafts, which gave each warship a designed top speed of 34 knots. However, this actually oscillated between 35 and 38 knots, depending on the vessel. Each ship had a complement of 146, with ranges of 1,700 nautical miles at 15 knots and 380 nautical miles at 34 knots. Only two of the four warships were transferred to Romania after the end of World War I, in 1920. They were renamed Mărăști and Mărășești. Upon commissioning by Romania on 1 July 1920, Mărăști and Mărășești were re-classified as destroyers, reverting to their original designation. However, English-language sources of the period refer to the two warships as flotilla leaders, most likely on account of their three cruiser-typical 152 mm guns. The two scout cruisers were finally re-armed as destroyers in 1925-1926, their three 152 mm guns being replaced by five 120 mm guns (two twin and one single). Despite being rearmed as destroyers, the two warships still presented some cruiser characteristics, such as having their torpedo tubes mounted on the broadsides instead of the centerline. As large destroyers in the limited waters of the Black Sea, the two warships were recognized as possible cruiser substitutes by British literature.
