= HMS Sappho (1873) =

Sloop of the Royal Navy

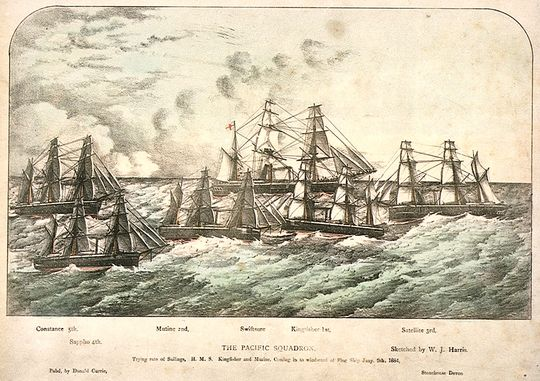
- The Pacific Squadron. Trying rate of sailings. HMS Sappho is shown at the bottom left

History

United Kingdom
- Name: HMS Sappho
- Namesake: Sappho
- Builder: Wigram & Sons, Blackwall
- Laid down: 1872
- Launched: 20 November 1873
- Completed: February 1874
- Fate: Sold for scrap, December 1887

General characteristics
- Class & type: Fantome-class sloop
- Displacement: 949 long tons (964 t)
- Tons burthen: 727 bm
- Length: 160 ft (48.8 m) (p/p)
- Beam: 31 ft 4 in (9.6 m)
- Draught: 14 ft (4.3 m)
- Depth: 15 ft 6 in (4.7 m)
- Installed power: 884 ihp (659 kW)
- Propulsion: 1 shaft; 1 × 2-cylinder horizontal compound expansion steam engine; 3 × cylindrical boilers
- Sail plan: Barque rig
- Speed: 10 knots (19 km/h; 12 mph)
- Range: 1,000 nmi (1,900 km; 1,200 mi) at 10 knots (19 km/h; 12 mph)
- Complement: 125
- Armament: 2 × 7-inch rifled muzzle-loading guns; 2 × 6.3-inch 64-pounder rifled muzzle-loading guns

HMS Sappho was a Fantome-class sloop, of the Royal Navy, built by Wigram & Sons, Blackwall and launched on 20 November 1873.

She was placed under the command of Commander Noel Stephen Fox Digby and commenced service at the Australian station in December 1874.

In May 1877 she was at Tonga when the tsunami from the Iquique earthquake struck the islands. The natives blamed her for bringing the tsunami.

In August 1877, still under Digby, she participated in the search for the missing crew and passengers of the Queen Bee that had run aground on Farewell Spit, New Zealand. She successfully found the missing third mate whom she took to Nelson. While at Nelson, her crew participated in a number of fund raising concerts for those shipwrecked.

She left the Australia Station in August 1878 and returned to England.

Sappho commenced service on the Pacific Station in 1881 until 1886 whereupon she returned to England and was paid off.

== Fate ==
She was sold for scrap in December 1887.

== Bibliography ==
- Ballard, G. A. (1939). "British Sloops of 1875: The Smaller Composite Type". The Mariner's Mirror. 25 (April). Cambridge, UK: Society for Nautical Research: 151–61. doi:10.1080/00253359.1939.10657329.
- Bastock, John (1988), Ships on the Australia Station, Child & Associates Publishing Pty Ltd; Frenchs Forest, Australia. ISBN 0-86777-348-0
- Colledge, J. J.; Wardlow, Ben & Bush, Steve (2020). Ships of the Royal Navy: The Complete Record of All Fighting Ships of the Royal Navy from the 15th Century to the Present (5th ed.). Barnsley, UK: Seaforth Publishing. ISBN 978-1-5267-9327-0.
- Roberts, John (1979). "Great Britain and Empire Forces". In Chesneau, Roger & Kolesnik, Eugene M. (eds.). Conway's All the World's Fighting Ships 1860-1905. Greenwich, UK: Conway Maritime Press. ISBN 0-8317-0302-4.
- Lyon, David & Winfield, Rif (2004). The Sail and Steam Navy List: All the Ships of the Royal Navy 1815–1889. Chatham Publishing. ISBN 978-1-86176-032-6. OCLC 52620555.
