= HMS Egeria (1873) =

Sloop of the Royal Navy

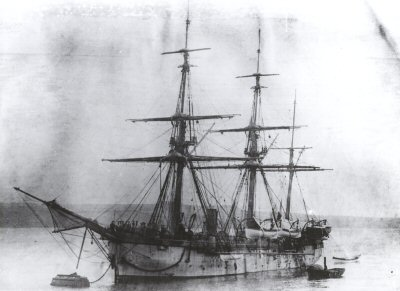
- HMS Egeria

History

United Kingdom
- Name: HMS Egeria
- Builder: Pembroke Royal Dockyard
- Cost: Hull £32,468, machinery £10,414
- Laid down: 30 December 1872
- Launched: 1 November 1873
- Completed: November 1874
- Reclassified: As survey ship, October 1886
- Fate: Sold, October 1911

General characteristics
- Class & type: Fantome-class sloop
- Displacement: 949 long tons (964 t)
- Tons burthen: 727 bm
- Length: 160 ft (48.8 m) (p/p)
- Beam: 31 ft 4 in (9.6 m)
- Draught: 14 ft (4.3 m)
- Depth: 15 ft 6 in (4.7 m)
- Installed power: 1,011 ihp (754 kW)
- Propulsion: 1 shaft; 1 × 2-cylinder horizontal compound expansion steam engine; 3 × cylindrical boilers
- Sail plan: Barque rig
- Speed: 11 knots (20 km/h; 13 mph)
- Range: 1,000 nmi (1,900 km; 1,200 mi) at 10 knots (19 km/h; 12 mph)
- Complement: 125
- Armament: 2 × 7-inch rifled muzzle-loading guns; 2 × 6.3-inch 64-pounder rifled muzzle-loading guns

HMS Egeria was a 4-gun screw sloop of the Fantome class launched at Pembroke on 1 November 1873. She was named after Egeria, a water nymph of Roman mythology, and was the second ship of the Royal Navy to bear the name. After a busy career in the East Indies, Pacific, Australia and Canada, she was sold for breaking in 1914 and was burnt at Burrard Inlet in British Columbia.

== Construction ==
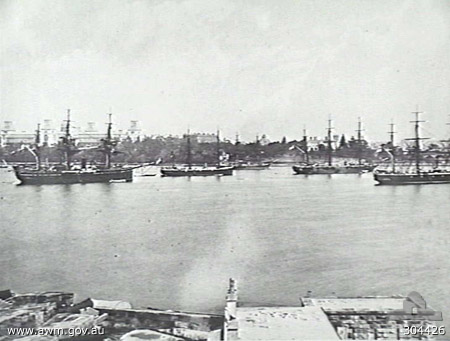
Ships of the Royal Navy's Australia Station, moored in Farm Cove, Sydney, c.1880. Egeria is the left-most ship

Egeria was constructed of an iron frame sheathed with teak and copper (hence 'composite'), and powered by a two-cylinder horizontal compound-expansion steam engine. This engine, provided by Humphrys, Tennant & Co., drove a single 11-foot (3.4 m) diameter screw and generated an indicated 1,011 horsepower (754 kW). Steam was provided by three cylindrical boilers working at 60 pounds per square inch (4.1 bar).

== Perak War ==
In 1875, Egeria, commanded by Commander Ralph Lancelot Turton, proceeded to Perak (in modern Malaysia), as one of a squadron of six ships under Captain Alexander Buller with his senior officer's pennant in HMS Modeste, to take part in an expedition against the murderers of Mr James Birch, the British Resident in Perak. While the troops and a naval brigade advanced on the upper reaches of the Perak River simultaneously from two points, Egeria blockaded the Perak Littoral, and sent her boats up the Kurow River. These boats destroyed or carried off some guns, arms, and ammunition which might have been useful to the enemy. Severe punishment was inflicted on the natives, but the murderers were not brought to account for some time afterwards.

== Intelligence gathering in the Russian Far East ==
During the Russo-Turkish War of 1877–1878, Egeria, commanded by Commander Archibald Douglas, was sent on an intelligence gathering mission to Petropavlovsk in Kamchatka. It was found to have been abandoned by its Russian garrison.

== Survey of Australia ==
From 1886, under the command of Captain Pelham Aldrich, Egeria was engaged in survey around Australia.

In 1887 she called at Christmas Island, and, in 1889, she cruised the Union and Phoenix Islands to declare a British protectorate over the region. The expedition raised a British flag on Atafu, Hull, Phoenix, and Sydney Islands, but encountered Americans on several other islands, including Swains.

In 1890 Hansard records that

One petty officer and one seaman of the Egeria were tried for attempting to make a mutinous assembly and for wilful disobedience to orders, and were sentenced respectively to five years' penal servitude and two years' imprisonment. Five other seamen were tried for disobedience, and sentenced to punishments varying from one year to six months' imprisonment.

== Survey of British Columbia ==
In 1898, Egeria arrived in British Columbia where she was engaged in coastal surveys for the Royal Navy until 1910, by which time coast surveying responsibilities had been transferred to the Canadian Hydrographic Service. The previous surveying ship, the steamship Beaver, had been paid off 28 years earlier in 1870.

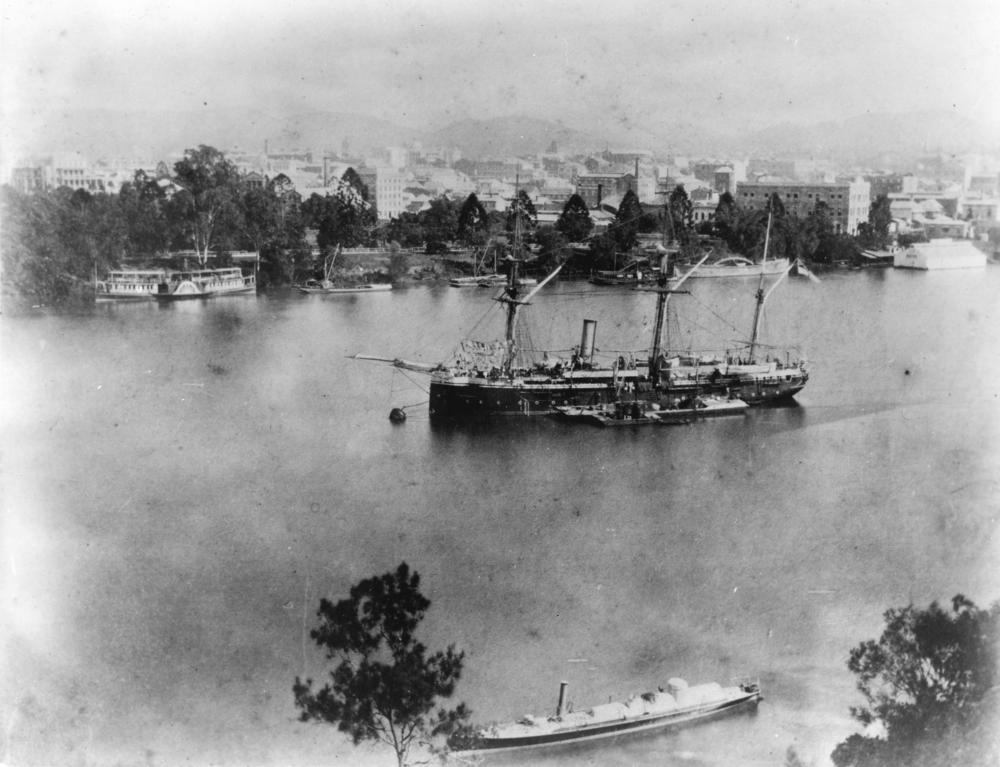
Egeria on the Brisbane River in 1889

Commander John Franklin Parry assumed command on 25 February 1903.

Egeria was primarily involved in resurveying settled areas of the British Columbia coast to create modern charts on a larger scale. The last survey it conducted was of Welcome Pass off the Sunshine Coast of British Columbia.

A representation of Egeria is included on a commemorative tile at the Marine Building at 355 Burrard St. in Vancouver, British Columbia. It is one of eight historic ships of British Columbia so honored by this Art Deco building which opened in 1930.

There is also an inscription carved into the rockface of a cliff overlooking Poets Cove on Pender Island, British Columbia. It says "1905 HMSEGERIA"

The galley and mess of HMCS Quadra at Goose Spit Site of 19 Wing Canadian Forces Base (CFB) Comox is named Egeria Hall after HMS Egeria. It was constructed in 1995.

== Decommissioning and sale ==
After many years in the Surveying Service, in November 1911 she was put up to public auction at Esquimalt, and sold to the Vancouver branch of the Navy League for £1,416.

== Fate ==
She was sold for breaking up in 1914. Her hulk was beached at Burrard Inlet, she was soaked in oil and set afire. The explosion killed three men.

== Legacy ==
HMS Egeria is commemorated in the scientific name of a species of lizard, Cryptoblepharus egeriae.

== Bibliography ==
- Ballard, G. A. (1939). "British Sloops of 1875: The Smaller Composite Type". Mariner's Mirror. 25 (April). Cambridge, UK: Society for Nautical Research: 151–161. doi:10.1080/00253359.1939.10657329.
- Bastock, John (1988), Ships on the Australia Station, Child & Associates Publishing Pty Ltd; Frenchs Forest, Australia. ISBN 0-86777-348-0
- Colledge, J. J.; Wardlow, Ben & Bush, Steve (2020). Ships of the Royal Navy: The Complete Record of All Fighting Ships of the Royal Navy from the 15th Century to the Present (5th ed.). Barnsley, UK: Seaforth Publishing. ISBN 978-1-5267-9327-0.
- Roberts, John (1979). "Great Britain and Empire Forces". In Chesneau, Roger & Kolesnik, Eugene M. (eds.). Conway's All the World's Fighting Ships 1860-1905. Greenwich, UK: Conway Maritime Press. ISBN 0-8317-0302-4.
- Lyon, David & Winfield, Rif (2004). The Sail and Steam Navy List: All the Ships of the Royal Navy 1815–1889. Chatham Publishing. ISBN 978-1-86176-032-6. OCLC 52620555.
