= HMS Flying Fish (1873) =

British Royal Navy ship in Korea and Japan

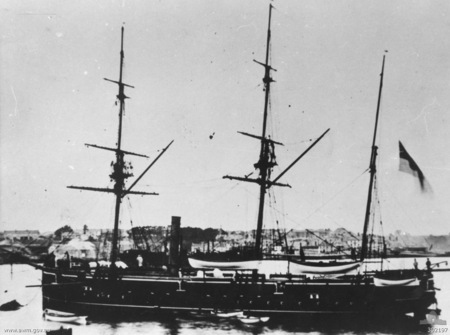
- HMS Flying Fish

History

United Kingdom
- Name: Flying Fish
- Namesake: Flying Fish
- Builder: Chatham Dockyard
- Laid down: 1872
- Launched: 27 November 1873
- Completed: June 1874
- Decommissioned: 1886
- Renamed: From Daring, 14 January 1873
- Reclassified: As survey ship, 1878
- Fate: Sold for scrap, December 1888

General characteristics
- Class & type: Fantome-class sloop
- Displacement: 949 long tons (964 t)
- Tons burthen: 727 bm
- Length: 160 ft (48.8 m) (p/p)
- Beam: 31 ft 4 in (9.6 m)
- Draught: 14 ft (4.3 m)
- Depth: 15 ft 6 in (4.7 m)
- Installed power: 3 × cylindrical boilers; 836 ihp (623 kW)
- Propulsion: 1 shaft; 1 × 2-cylinder horizontal compound-expansion steam engine
- Sail plan: Barque rig
- Speed: 10 knots (19 km/h; 12 mph)
- Range: 1,000 nmi (1,900 km; 1,200 mi) at 10 knots (19 km/h; 12 mph)
- Complement: 125
- Armament: 2 × 7-inch rifled muzzle-loading guns; 2 × 6.3-inch 64-pounder rifled muzzle-loading guns

HMS Flying Fish was a Fantome-class sloop of the Royal Navy, built at Chatham Dockyard and launched on 27 November 1873. Originally intended to be named Daring, she was renamed Flying Fish before launch on 14 January 1873.

== Service history ==
=== Early service and the Far East ===
She commenced service with the East Indies Station in 1874 in the suppression of the slave trade off the East African coast. She paid off in 1878 for conversion to a survey vessel and in 1880 commenced hydrographic surveys in the East Indies. In December 1880 she arrived in Hong Kong to commence surveying duties in East Asia (on the China Station) under the command of Richard F Hoskyn. In November 1881, in Kobe, Japan, a party of sailors from the ship formed an honour guard for George French, Chief Justice of the British Supreme Court for China and Japan who had died in that city.

=== Involvement in the Imo incident ===
In July 1882, Flying Fish was involved in the rescue of the Japanese legation which had escaped from Seoul after an armed uprising by mutinous Korean troops there. Flying Fish transported the surviving members of the legation back to Japan. On 17 November, for his part in rescuing the survivors, the Emperor of Japan presented the captain with a pair of bronze vases and some books – including one on the ancient conquest of Korea.

It is commonly said, though unproven, that the British sailors on this mission played the first game of football or soccer in Korean history and thereby introduced the game to Korea.

=== Russian scare and later service ===
From 1883 to 1887, she was under the command of John Maclear. During the Russian war scare of 1885, she was rearmed and rejoined fleet duties. However in 1886, she reverted to survey duties on the Australia Station. She left the Australia Station later in 1886 and returned to England where she paid off. She was sold in 1888.

== Legacy ==
Flying Fish Cove on Christmas Island is named after her. During the visit to this island collections of animal specimens were made by the crew. This collection was reviewed in England and new species were described, including a previously unknown fruit bat species, Pteropus natalis, that is only found on the island.

A species of snake, Ramphotyphlops exocoeti, is named after her ("exocet" means "flying fish").

== Bibliography ==
- Ballard, G. A. (1939). "British Sloops of 1875: The Smaller Composite Type". Mariner's Mirror. 25 (April). Cambridge, UK: Society for Nautical Research: 151–61.
- Bastock, John (1988), Ships on the Australia Station, Child & Associates Publishing Pty Ltd; Frenchs Forest, Australia. ISBN 0-86777-348-0
- Colledge, J. J.; Wardlow, Ben & Bush, Steve (2020). Ships of the Royal Navy: The Complete Record of All Fighting Ships of the Royal Navy from the 15th Century to the Present (5th ed.). Barnsley, UK: Seaforth Publishing. ISBN 978-1-5267-9327-0.
- Keene, Donald (2002). Emperor of Japan: Meiji and His World, 1852–1912. New York: Columbia University Press. ISBN 0-231-12341-8.
- Lengerer, Hans (September 2020). "The 1882 Coup d'État in Korea and the Second Expansion of the Imperial Japanese Navy: A Contribution to the Pre-History of the Chinese-Japanese War 1894–95". Warship International. LVII (3): 185–196. ISSN 0043-0374.
- Roberts, John (1979). "Great Britain and Empire Forces". In Chesneau, Roger & Kolesnik, Eugene M. (eds.). Conway's All the World's Fighting Ships 1860-1905. Greenwich, UK: Conway Maritime Press. ISBN 0-8317-0302-4.
- Lyon, David & Winfield, Rif (2004). The Sail and Steam Navy List: All the Ships of the Royal Navy 1815–1889. Chatham Publishing. ISBN 978-1-86176-032-6. OCLC 52620555.
