= HMS Fantome (1873) =

Sloop of the Royal Navy

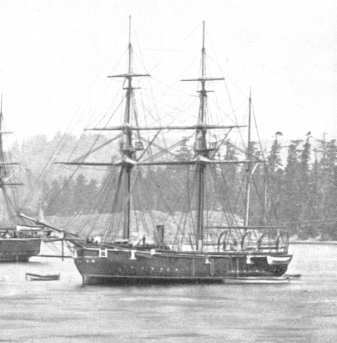
- Fantome

History

United Kingdom
- Name: HMS Fantome
- Builder: Chatham Royal Dockyard
- Laid down: 1872
- Launched: 26 March 1873
- Completed: December 1873
- Decommissioned: 1886
- Fate: Sold for scrap, February 1889

General characteristics
- Class & type: Fantome-class sloop
- Displacement: 949 long tons (964 t)
- Tons burthen: 727 bm
- Length: 160 ft (48.8 m) (p/p)
- Beam: 31 ft 4 in (9.6 m)
- Draught: 14 ft (4.3 m)
- Depth: 15 ft 6 in (4.7 m)
- Installed power: 975 ihp (727 kW)
- Propulsion: 1 shaft; 1 × 2-cylinder horizontal compound-expansion steam engine; 3 × cylindrical boilers
- Sail plan: Barque rig
- Speed: 11 knots (20 km/h; 13 mph)
- Range: 1,000 nmi (1,900 km; 1,200 mi) at 10 knots (19 km/h; 12 mph)
- Complement: 125
- Armament: 2 × 7-inch rifled muzzle-loading guns; 2 × 6.3-inch 64-pounder rifled muzzle-loading guns

HMS Fantome was the lead ship of the Fantome-class sloops built for the Royal Navy in the mid-1870s.

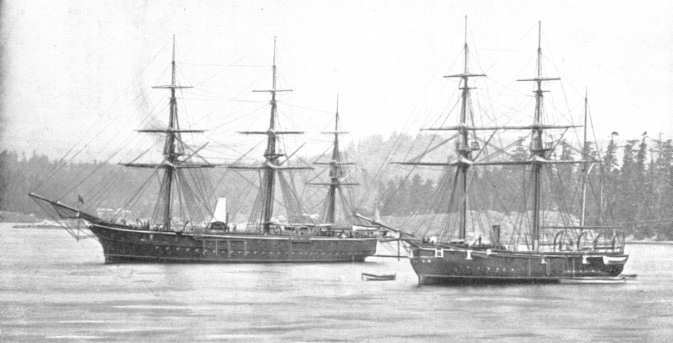
HMS Opal and HMS Fantome

== Bibliography ==
- Ballard, G. A. (1939). "British Sloops of 1875: The Smaller Composite Type". Mariner's Mirror. 25 (April). Cambridge, UK: Society for Nautical Research: 151–61.
- Colledge, J. J.; Wardlow, Ben & Bush, Steve (2020). Ships of the Royal Navy: The Complete Record of All Fighting Ships of the Royal Navy from the 15th Century to the Present (5th ed.). Barnsley, UK: Seaforth Publishing. ISBN 978-1-5267-9327-0.
- Roberts, John (1979). "Great Britain and Empire Forces". In Chesneau, Roger & Kolesnik, Eugene M. (eds.). Conway's All the World's Fighting Ships 1860-1905. Greenwich, UK: Conway Maritime Press. ISBN 0-8317-0302-4.
- Lyon, David & Winfield, Rif (2004). The Sail and Steam Navy List: All the Ships of the Royal Navy 1815–1889. Chatham Publishing. ISBN 978-1-86176-032-6. OCLC 52620555.
