= HMS Daring (1874) =

Sloop of the Royal Navy

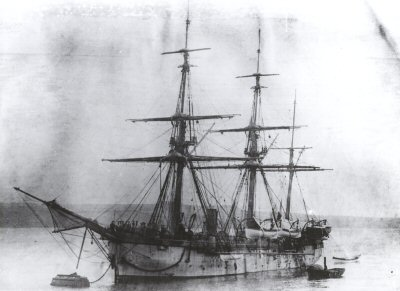
- HMS Daring's sister ship, HMS Egeria

History

United Kingdom
- Name: HMS Daring
- Builder: Blackwall Yard, London
- Laid down: 1872
- Launched: 4 February 1874
- Completed: September 1874
- Decommissioned: 1889
- Fate: Sold for scrap, August 1889

General characteristics
- Class & type: Fantome-class sloop
- Displacement: 949 long tons (964 t)
- Tons burthen: 727 bm
- Length: 160 ft (48.8 m) (p/p)
- Beam: 31 ft 4 in (9.6 m)
- Draught: 14 ft (4.3 m)
- Depth: 15 ft 6 in (4.7 m)
- Installed power: 915 ihp (682 kW)
- Propulsion: 1 shaft; 1 × 2-cylinder horizontal compound trunk steam engine; 3 × cylindrical boilers
- Sail plan: Barque rig
- Speed: 10 knots (19 km/h; 12 mph)
- Range: 1,000 nmi (1,900 km; 1,200 mi) at 10 knots (19 km/h; 12 mph)
- Complement: 125
- Armament: 2 × 7-inch rifled muzzle-loading guns; 2 × 6.3-inch 64-pounder rifled muzzle-loading guns

HMS Daring was a 4-gun Fantome-class sloop of the Royal Navy. She was launched in 1874 and sold for breaking in 1889 after serving most of her career in the Pacific.

== Construction ==
Daring was constructed of an iron frame sheathed with teak and copper (hence 'composite'), and powered by a trunk engine provided by John Penn & Sons. She was fitted with a full barque rig of sails.

== History ==
Daring served on the Pacific and China Stations, working some of the time for the Canadian Government, including conducting hydrography, for which the Canadian Government bore half the cost. In Spring 18?? she carried Joseph Howe (the Provincial Secretary at the time) to the mouth of the Tangier River in Halifax County, Nova Scotia. There he arranged to have law and order restored by carving the gold diggings into appropriately sized lots, and offering them for rental for $40. In 1877 Commander John Hammer made a sketch survey of the Skeena River entrance from Daring.

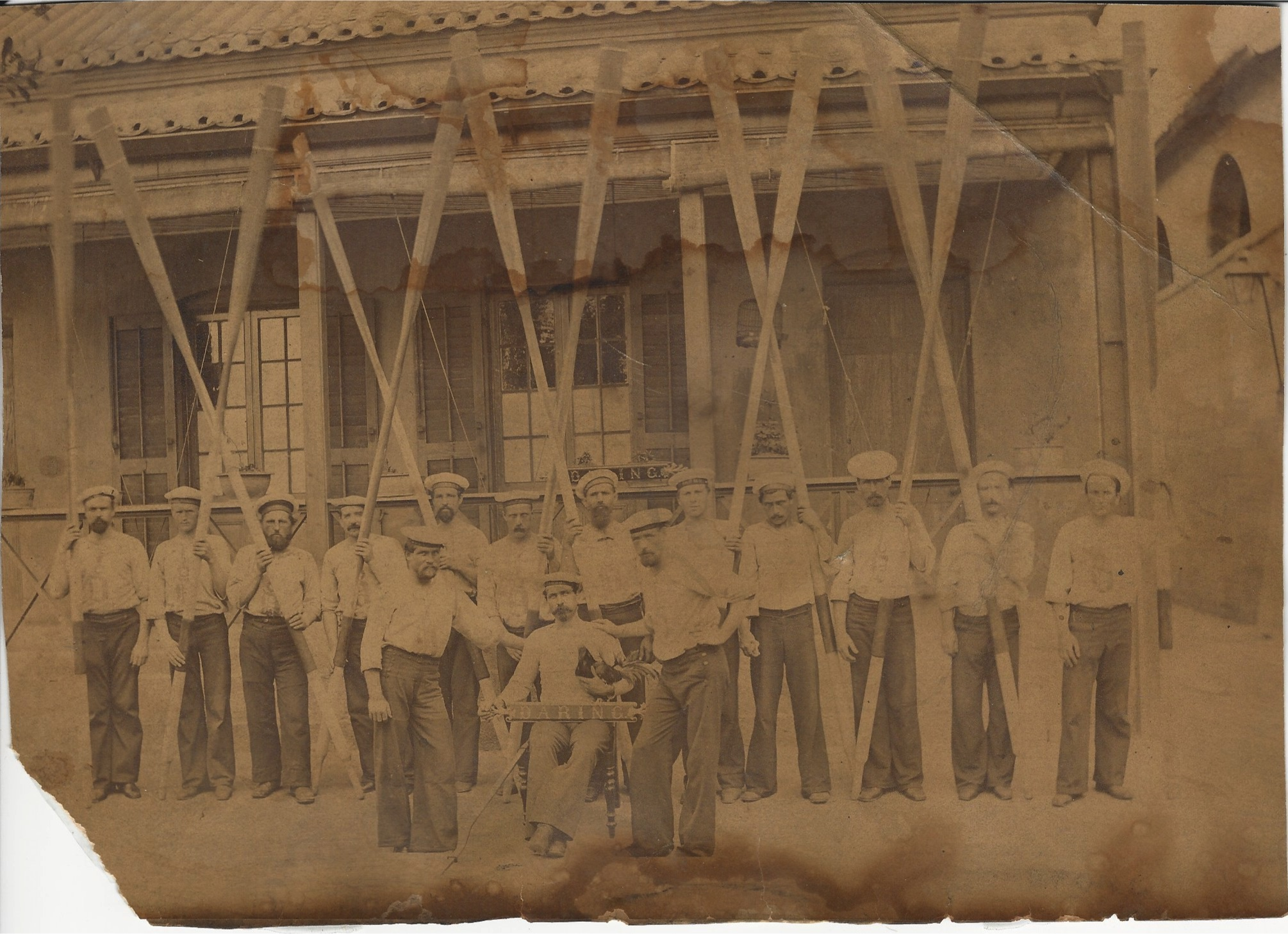
Crew of HMS Daring circa 1885, and their mascot, a rooster

== Fate ==
She was sold to a Mr J Cohen in 1889 and broken up.

== Bibliography ==
- Ballard, G. A. (1939). "British Sloops of 1875: The Smaller Composite Type". Mariner's Mirror. 25 (April). Cambridge, UK: Society for Nautical Research: 151–61.
- Colledge, J. J.; Wardlow, Ben & Bush, Steve (2020). Ships of the Royal Navy: The Complete Record of All Fighting Ships of the Royal Navy from the 15th Century to the Present (5th ed.). Barnsley, UK: Seaforth Publishing. ISBN 978-1-5267-9327-0.
- Roberts, John (1979). "Great Britain and Empire Forces". In Chesneau, Roger & Kolesnik, Eugene M. (eds.). Conway's All the World's Fighting Ships 1860-1905. Greenwich, UK: Conway Maritime Press. ISBN 0-8317-0302-4.
- Lyon, David & Winfield, Rif (2004). The Sail and Steam Navy List: All the Ships of the Royal Navy 1815–1889. Chatham Publishing. ISBN 978-1-86176-032-6. OCLC 52620555.
