= USRC Wolcott (1873) =

Ship of the U.S. Revenue Cutter Service

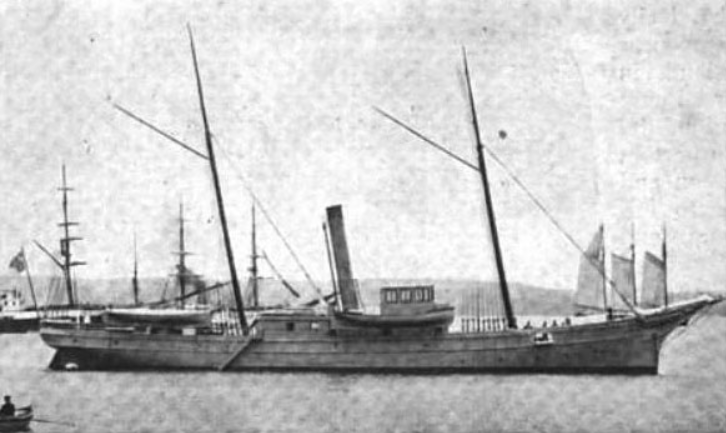

History

U.S. Revenue-Marine
- Name: USRC Wolcott
- Namesake: Oliver Wolcott Jr. (1760–1833), second United States Secretary of the Treasury (1795–1800)
- Builder: Risdon Iron Works, San Francisco, California
- Acquired: 3 July 1873
- Commissioned: 30 July 1873
- Home port: Port Townsend, Washington
- Notes: U.S. Revenue-Marine became U.S. Revenue Cutter Service 1894

U.S. Revenue Cutter Service
- Name: USRC Wolcott
- Namesake: Oliver Wolcott Jr. (1760–1833), second United States Secretary of the Treasury (1795–1800)
- Home port: Port Townsend, Washington
- Fate: Sold 19 February 1897

United States
- Name: Wolcott
- Namesake: Previous name retained
- Home port: San Francisco, California
- Fate: Wrecked 31 January 1900

General characteristics as revenue cutter
- Type: Revenue cutter
- Displacement: 235 tons
- Length: 155 ft (47.2 m)
- Beam: 22 ft (6.7 m)
- Draft: 9 ft 7 in (2.9 m)
- Propulsion: Vertical-cylinder, surface-condensing steam engine
- Sail plan: Schooner-rigged
- Complement: 39 (8 officers, 31 enlisted)
- Armament: 2 x guns

General characteristics as commercial vessel
- Type: Steam schooner
- Tonnage: 247 GRT; 148 NRT
- Length: 131.5 ft (40.1 m)
- Beam: 22.5 ft (6.9 m)
- Depth: 14.3 ft (4.4 m)
- Propulsion: Vertical-cylinder, surface-condensing steam engine
- Sail plan: Schooner-rigged

USRC Wolcott, the second ship of the name, sometimes referred to as USRC Oliver Wolcott, was a revenue cutter in commission in the United States Revenue-Marine from 1873 to 1894 and in the United States Revenue Cutter Service from 1894 to 1897. She served in the waters of the Territory of Alaska during her career. After her revenue cutter service, she operated as a merchant vessel until she was wrecked in 1900.

== Construction and commissioning ==
Wolcott was built by Risden Iron Works at San Francisco, California. She was constructed of white oak and yellow fir brought to San Francisco from Oregon and Washington, and was schooner-rigged with iron-wire standing rigging. She had a vertical-cylinder, surface-condensing steam engine. Revenue Captain White accepted her for service on behalf of the U.S. Revenue-Marine on 3 July 1873, and she entered service on 30 July 1873 when the crew of the revenue cutter USRC Wayanda, which she replaced, cross-decked from Wayanda to her.

== Service history ==
=== Revenue cutter ===
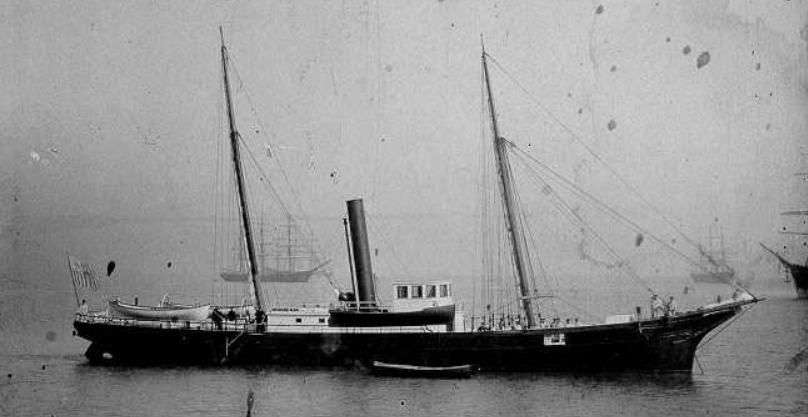
USRC Wolcott at Port Townsend, Washington, in 1884

Home-ported at Port Townsend, Washington, Wolcott was assigned to the Bering Sea Patrol and spent most of her career operating in the waters of the Territory of Alaska. Her crew deserted in 1882, apparently because of low wages, her commanding officer, Revenue Captain L. N. Stodder having orders not to allow wages for her crew to exceed $40 per month. Re-manned, she arrived at the request of authorities in British Columbia, Canada, at Port Simpson, British Columbia, in 1883 to guard against a feared uprising by Native Americans there.

The U.S. Revenue-Marine was renamed the U.S. Revenue Cutter Service in 1894. Late in Wolcott's career, she rescued the survivors of the schooner Elwood at Killisnoo in Southeast Alaska. Elwood had been wrecked on a reef off Gardner Point (57°01′N 134°37′W) on 14 December 1895 with the loss of one life, and her survivors made a journey via Murder Cove on the southernmost coast of Admiralty Island in the Alexander Archipelago in order to reach Killisnoo. Wolcott transported them to Sitka.

Wolcott was sold to Joshua Green of Seattle, Washington, for $3,050 on 19 February 1897.

=== Commercial service ===
After her sale, Wolcott retained her name and entered service as a merchant vessel. As of 1899 her home port was San Francisco.

Wolcott's last voyage ended in Alaskan waters. On 29 January 1900, she departed Unga on Unga Island in the Aleutian Islands bound for Sitka with seven passengers, a crew of 17, and 50 pounds (22.7 kg) of gold bullion valued at $13,357.26 aboard. On 31 January, she struck a submerged reef – thereafter known as Wolcott Reef (57°40′15″N 154°11′45″W) – and was beached at Rocky Point (57.6622222°N 154.2322222°W) on Kodiak Island, 7 nautical miles (13 km; 8.1 mi) west-southwest of Uyak Bay (57.8000°N 154.0667°W), to prevent her from sinking. All on board reached safety and the gold bullion was salvaged, but Wolcott became a total loss. Valued at $15,000 at the time of her loss, she was insured for $12,500.
