= USC&GS Yukon (1873) =

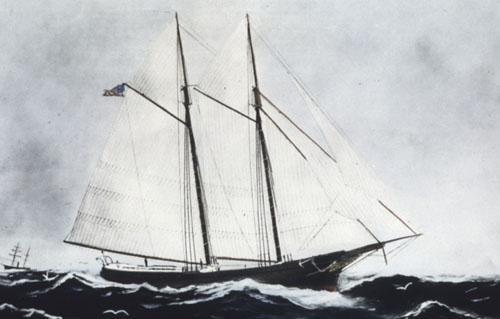
- Yukon

History

United States Coast Survey
- Name: USCS Yukon
- Commissioned: 1873
- Renamed: USC&GS Yukon (1878)
- Fate: Sold 1894
- Notes: The U.S. Coast Survey was renamed the U.S. Coast and Geodetic Survey in 1878

United States
- Name: Elwood
- Identification: Signal letters: QVTN
- Fate: Wrecked 14 December 1895

General characteristics as survey ship
- Type: Survey ship
- Tonnage: 101
- Length: 84 ft (26 m)
- Beam: 22 ft 2 in (6.8 m)
- Draft: 9 ft (2.7 m)
- Propulsion: Sails
- Sail plan: Schooner-rigged

General characteristics in commercial service
- Type: Schooner
- Tonnage: 97.27 GRT; 92.44 NRT
- Length: 84 ft (25.6 m)
- Beam: 23 ft (7.0 m)
- Depth: 8 ft (2.4 m)
- Propulsion: Sails
- Sail plan: Schooner-rigged

USC&GS Yukon was a schooner that served as a survey ship from 1878 to 1894 in the United States Coast Survey, which was renamed the United States Coast and Geodetic Survey in 1878. She was the pioneering Coast Survey or Coast and Geodetic Survey ship in many of the waters of the Territory of Alaska, including the Bering Sea and the western Aleutian Islands, and she also operated extensively in California and Washington. She later entered commercial service as Elwood and was wrecked in 1895.

== Career ==
=== Survey ship ===
Yukon was the first Coast Survey ship to bear the name. She entered Coast Survey service in 1873, having been built and outfitted in Kennebunk, Maine, specifically for Alaska service. The Coast Survey was renamed the Coast and Geodetic Survey in 1878.

Yukon is most noted for cruises under Acting Assistant William Healey Dall in 1873, 1874, and 1880, leading to the publication of the Pacific Coast Pilot - Alaska in 1883. The 1873 cruise surveyed the western half of the Aleutian Islands, the eastern half having been surveyed the previous year by the U.S. Coast Survey schooner USCS Humboldt. The 1874 cruise first proceeded to Sitka in Southeast Alaska, and then west along the coast of the Gulf of Alaska as far as Unalaska in the Aleutians, and then entered the Bering Sea and visited Nunivak Island and the Pribilof Islands before returning to Sitka. In 1880, Yukon initially followed much the same course as in 1874, but also included stops at Plover Bay (now Provideniya Bay) on the coast of Siberia, the Diomede Islands, and Point Belcher on Alaska's Chukchi Sea coast.

A particular focus of these trips was to correct the position of the various bays and islands, which were often misplaced by as much as 20 nautical miles (37 km; 23 mi) on the charts of the era, and to document compass variation. These activities depended on astronomical observation to determine location and direction, observations which were notoriously difficult in the cloudy and variable weather of the Bering Sea. The Plover Bay visits of 1880 served to recalibrate marine chronometers against the known longitude of that location. Marcus Baker was the astronomical observer for all three trips.

Another focus was the collection of biological specimens. The 1880 cruise carried Tarleton Bean as biological observer. Bean's focus was to document the fish and other marine resources of the region from both a scientific and a practical perspective. Edward Perry Herendeen – a former whaling captain who later went to Point Barrow on Alaska's Arctic Ocean coast with the International Polar Expedition of 1881–1883 commanded by United States Army First Lieutenant Patrick H. Ray – was sailing master for all three trips.

Yukon also worked in California and extensively in Washington. In 1877 and 1878, Yukon carried out a hydrographic survey of upper Puget Sound under United States Navy Lieutenant Richard M. Cutts, assisted by Lieutenants Ambrose B. Wyckoff and U. Harris. Wyckoff's observations convinced him that Puget Sound was an ideal location for a naval shipyard. His reports and enthusiastic promotion over the subsequent 13 years led to establishment of the Puget Sound Naval Station at Bremerton, Washington, of which he served the first commander from 1891 to 1893.

Yukon was decommissioned in 1894 and was sold that year at Tacoma, Washington.

=== Commercial service ===
After her sale, the ship entered commercial service as a schooner with the name Elwood.

Elwood departed Seattle, Washington, on 1 September 1895 bound for Kodiak on Kodiak Island and Cook Inlet on the south-central coast of Alaska on what was destined to be her final voyage. At 2:00 a.m. on 14 December 1895, she was wrecked on a reef off Gardner Point (57°01′N 134°37′W) in Southeast Alaska. One member of her crew died when he attempted to reach shore. Her captain and the rest of her crew reached land safely by clinging to her wreckage. Once ashore, they made their way to Murder Cove on the southernmost coast of Admiralty Island in the Alexander Archipelago and then to Killisnoo, where the United States Revenue Cutter Service revenue cutter USRC Wolcott rescued them. Wolcott transported them to Sitka.

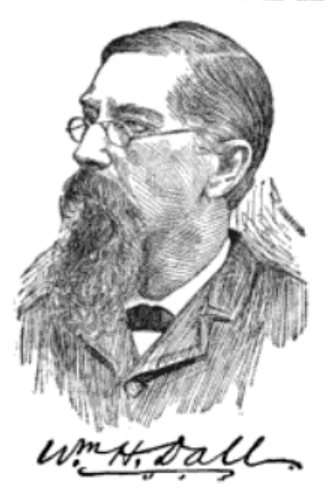
William Healey Dall

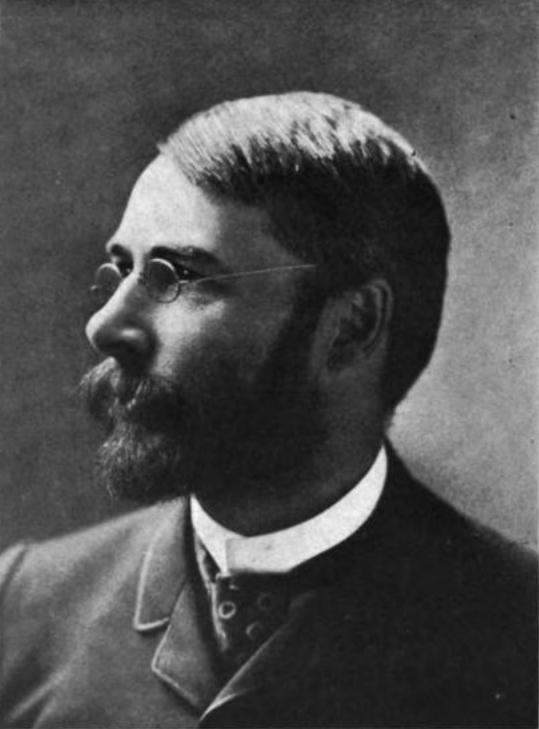
Marcus Baker

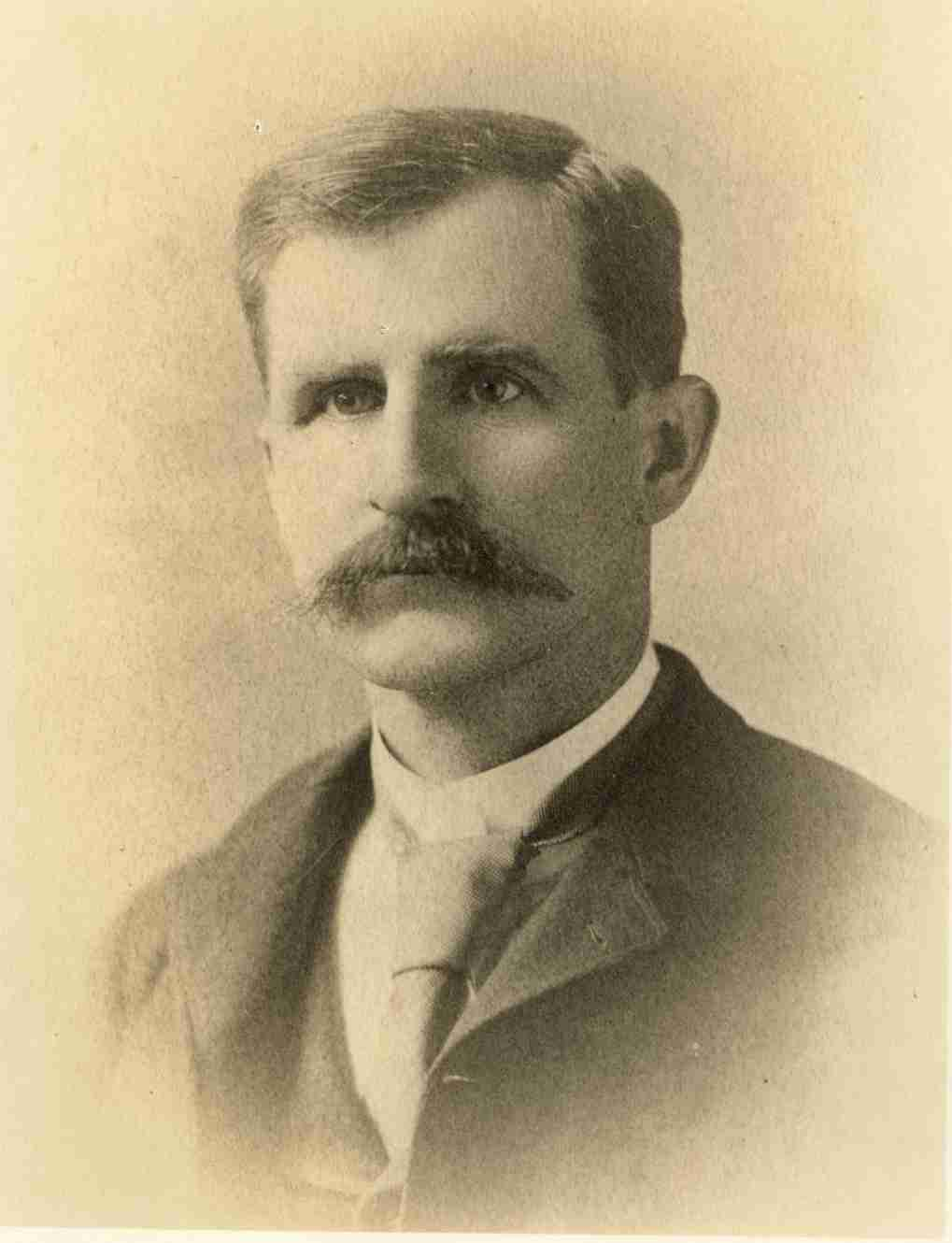
Tarleton Hoffman Bean

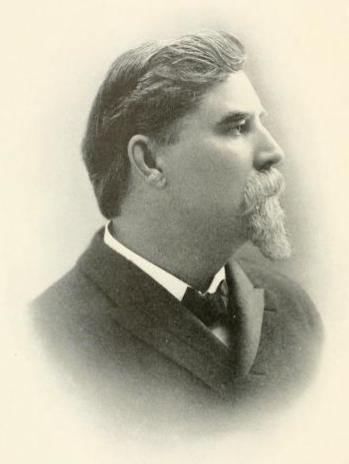
Ambrose B. Wyckoff
