= SS Nurnberg =

Steamship also rigged for sail built in 1874

History
- Owner: Norddeutscher Lloyd
- Builder: Robert Steele & Company
- Yard number: 80
- Launched: September 9, 1873
- Maiden voyage: Bremen-Southampton
- Fate: Scrapped - 1895 at Vegesack

General characteristics
- Type: Passenger Cargo Vessel
- Tonnage: 3116 grt
- Length: 351 ft
- Beam: 39.1 ft
- Propulsion: single screw, also rigged for sail
- Speed: 12 kt

The SS Nurnberg was a 351-foot steamship that was also rigged for sail, built in 1874 by Robert Steele & Company, Yard No 80.

She carried passengers between Bremen and New York City, Bremen and Baltimore, then later between Bremen and Australia.
