= NMS Fulgerul =

Romanian gunboat

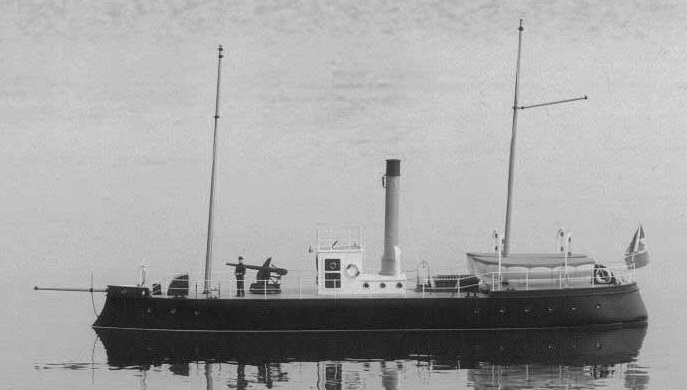
- Fulgerul early in her career (note the 87 mm gun)

History

Romania
- Name: Fulgerul
- Namesake: Lightning
- Builder: Forges et Chantiers de la Mediterranée, Toulon, France
- Cost: 130,000 lei
- Laid down: 1873
- Launched: 1873
- Commissioned: 1874
- Fate: Scrapped in 1968

Service record
- Operations: Romanian War of Independence; World War I

General characteristics
- Type: Gunboat
- Displacement: 85 tons
- Length: 25 meters
- Beam: 4.57 meters
- Draught: 1.22 meters
- Propulsion: Steam, 25 hp
- Speed: 7 knots
- Armament: Romanian War of Independence: 1 x 87 mm Krupp gun; 2 x rams; Mines; World War I: 1 x 57 mm Nordenfelt gun; 1 x 37 mm pom-pom gun; 2 x rams
- Armour: Unknown

NMS Fulgerul was a gunboat of the Romanian Navy built in France in 1873. She was the first warship to carry the Romanian flag across the sea. She briefly saw service with the Imperial Russian Navy as Velikiy Knyaz Nikolay during the Romanian War of Independence. Fulgerul was transferred to border guards in 1910, and ended her days in 1968 as an oil fuel store at Galati.

== Construction and specifications ==
Fulgerul was built at La Seyne-sur-Mer near Toulon, France, by Forges et Chantiers de la Mediterranée at a cost of 130,000 lei. She was launched and completed in 1873. Her displacement amounted to 85 tons. She was armed with one gun and her power plant generated an output of 25 hp. Fulgerul measured 82 feet (25 meters) in length, with a beam of 15 feet (4.6 meters) and a draught of 4 feet (1.2 meters). The gunboat was also armored, her gun being a Krupp weapon with the caliber of 87 mm. This was initially installed in a turret, but that was found to be unsatisfactory and was removed. She was powered by a steam engine, her top speed amounting to 7 knots. Her bow and aft both ended in iron rams.

== Career ==
Fulgerul was brought from Toulon to Galați between late 1873 and early 1874, by the Romanian Admiral Ioan Murgescu. She thus became the first warship of the Romanian Navy to carry the Romanian flag across the Mediterranean and the Black Sea. The delivery voyage was made without the Krupp gun, which was sent separately by land, for fear of difficulties when passing through Ottoman waters; despite this the ship was detained at Çanakkale in the Dardanelles for several days for inspection, but permitted to continue as she was unarmed. She finally arrived at Galati on 14 April 1874, and the gun was fitted. She was commissioned on 15 June 1874 and also functioned as a training ship.

The gunboat was part of the Danube Flotilla during the Romanian War of Independence of 1877. During the war, she was incorporated by agreement in the Imperial Russian Navy as Velikiy Knyaz Nikolay (Grand Duke Nicholas) and employed, with a mostly Russian crew as a minelayer, laying mine barrages across the Danube in order to restrict the movement of Ottoman warships. At the end of the war in 1878, she was returned to the Romanian navy and reverted to Fulgerul. After another period as a training ship up to 1882, she was declared militarily obsolete in 1886.

On 1 April 1910, Fulgerul was allotted to a newly-created unit of marine border guards and was listed in service in World War I as a coastguard cruiser. By then she was armed with one 6-pdr and one 1-pdr guns. Later, she was reduced to an oil fuel store and later used as such by the shipbuilding yard at Galati. In 1968 Fulgerul was given to the shipyard branch of the Union of Communist Youth (UTC) which sent her for scrapping.
