= HMS Albatross (1873) =

Sloop of the Royal Navy

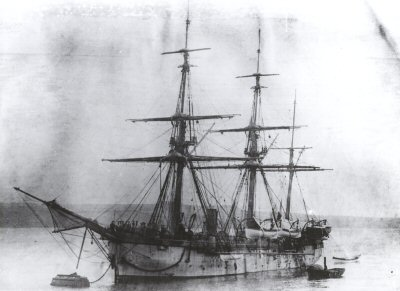
- HMS Albatross's sister ship, HMS Egeria

History

United Kingdom
- Name: HMS Albatross
- Namesake: Albatross
- Builder: Chatham Royal Dockyard
- Laid down: 1872
- Launched: 27 April 1873
- Completed: February 1874
- Fate: Scrapped, February 1889

General characteristics
- Class & type: Fantome-class sloop
- Displacement: 949 long tons (964 t)
- Tons burthen: 727 bm
- Length: 160 ft (48.8 m) (p/p)
- Beam: 31 ft 4 in (9.6 m)
- Draught: 14 ft (4.3 m)
- Depth: 15 ft 6 in (4.7 m)
- Installed power: 838 ihp (625 kW)
- Propulsion: 1 shaft; 1 × 2-cylinder horizontal compound-expansion steam engine; 3 × cylindrical boilers
- Sail plan: Barque rig
- Speed: 10 knots (19 km/h; 12 mph)
- Range: 1,000 nmi (1,900 km; 1,200 mi) at 10 knots (19 km/h; 12 mph)
- Complement: 125
- Armament: 2 × 7-inch rifled muzzle-loading guns; 2 × 6.3-inch 64-pounder rifled muzzle-loading guns

HMS Albatross was a 4-gun Fantome-class sloop built for the Royal Navy in the mid-1870s.

== History ==
In May 1886, she was driven ashore at Hong Kong whilst going to the assistance of the British ship Dafila, which had also driven ashore. Both vessels were refloated, and HMS Albatross towed Dafila in to Hoikow, China.

== Figurehead ==
This carving is not a true figurehead but a scroll designed for a sloop’s vertical bow.

The carving was still at Chatham Dockyard in 1938 but 11 years later, it had been moved to HMS Ganges in Shotley, Suffolk. This establishment closed in 1984 and the carving was transferred to the collections of the then Royal Naval Museum.

The carving can be seen in the Figureheads Gallery at the National Museum of the Royal Navy, Portsmouth.

== Bibliography ==
- Ballard, G. A. (1939). "British Sloops of 1875: The Smaller Composite Type". Mariner's Mirror. 25 (April). Society for Nautical Research: 151–61.
- Colledge, J. J.; Wardlow, Ben & Bush, Steve (2020). Ships of the Royal Navy: The Complete Record of All Fighting Ships of the Royal Navy from the 15th Century to the Present (5th ed.). Seaforth Publishing. ISBN 978-1-5267-9327-0.
- Roberts, John (1979). "Great Britain and Empire Forces". In Chesneau, Roger & Kolesnik, Eugene M. (eds.). Conway's All the World's Fighting Ships 1860-1905. Conway Maritime Press. ISBN 0-8317-0302-4.
- Lyon, David & Winfield, Rif (2004). The Sail and Steam Navy List: All the Ships of the Royal Navy 1815–1889. Chatham Publishing. ISBN 978-1-86176-032-6. OCLC 52620555.
