= PS Thomas Dugdale =

History
- Name: 1873–1890: P.S. Thomas Dugdale; 1890–1893: P.S. Laurel
- Owner: 1873–1883: Lancashire and Yorkshire Railway; 1883–1893: Irish National Steamship Company
- Operator: 1873–1883: Lancashire and Yorkshire Railway; 1883–1893: Irish National Steamship Company
- Port of registry: (United Kingdom)
- Route: 1873–1883: Belfast – Fleetwood
- Builder: A. Leslie and Company, River Tyne
- Out of service: 1893
- Fate: Scrapped

General characteristics
- Tonnage: 1,000 gross register tons (GRT)
- Length: 260ft

PS Thomas Dugdale was a paddle steamer passenger vessel operated by the London and North Western Railway and the Lancashire and Yorkshire Railway from 1873 to 1883.

== History ==
She was built by A. Leslie and Company on the River Tyne for the London and North Western Railway and the Lancashire and Yorkshire Railway for their services from Fleetwood.

She was named after one of the directors of the Lancashire and Yorkshire Railway.

In 1882 she received new engines by Rankin and Blackmore.

She collided with PS Azalea of Glasgow, in Lough Foyle, on or about 4 September 1888.

She was renamed P.S. Laurel around 1890.
