= Fantome-class sloop =

1873 class of British screw sloops

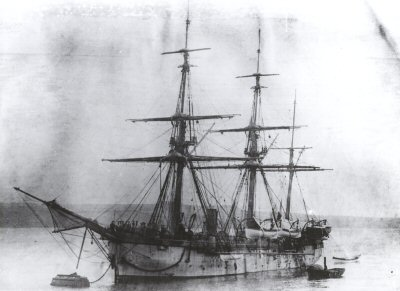
- HMS Egeria

Class overview
- Name: Fantome-class sloops
- Builders: Pembroke Dock; Blackwall Yard; Chatham Dockyard; Money Wigram & Sons
- Operators: Royal Navy
- Preceded by: Eclipse class
- Succeeded by: Osprey class
- Cost: Egeria: Hull £32,468, machinery £10,414
- Built: 1873–1874
- In commission: 1873–1911
- Completed: 6
- Scrapped: 6

General characteristics
- Type: Screw composite sloop
- Displacement: 949 long tons (964 t)
- Tons burthen: 727 bm
- Length: 160 ft (48.8 m) (p/p)
- Beam: 31 ft 4 in (9.6 m)
- Draught: 14 ft (4.3 m)
- Depth: 15 ft 6 in (4.7 m)
- Installed power: 836–1,011 ihp (623–754 kW)
- Propulsion: 1 shaft; 1 × 2-cylinder horizontal compound expansion steam engine; 3 × cylindrical boilers
- Sail plan: Barque rig
- Speed: 10–11 knots (19–20 km/h; 12–13 mph)
- Range: 1,000 nmi (1,900 km; 1,200 mi) at 10 knots (19 km/h; 12 mph)
- Complement: 140
- Armament: 2 × 7-inch rifled muzzle-loading guns; 2 × 6.3-inch 64-pounder rifled muzzle-loading guns

The Fantome class was a six-ship class of 4-gun screw composite sloops built for the Royal Navy during 1873 and 1874.

== Design ==
=== Construction ===
Fantome and her sister ships were constructed with an iron frame that was sheathed in teak and copper (hence 'composite').

=== Propulsion ===
The ships were powered by a two-cylinder horizontal compound-expansion steam engine supplied by Humphrys, Tennant & Co. This engine powered an 11-foot (3.4 m) diameter screw. Steam was generated by three cylindrical boilers operating at 60 pounds per square inch (4.1 bar). The indicated horsepower varied from 836 to 1,011 ihp (623 to 754 kW). Additionally, Daring was equipped with a trunk engine provided by John Penn & Sons.

=== Sailing rig ===
All ships in the class were provided with a full barque rig.

=== Armament ===
The Fantome class carried two 7-inch (180 mm) and two 64-pounder muzzle-loading rifles, all mounted on pivots.

== Evaluation ==
Built during a significant technological change in naval architecture, these composite sloops became obsolete before they were completed. Nevertheless, they served an important role on the far-flung stations of the British Empire, including participation in minor wars, such as the Perak War. They were also used for hydrography, and for this reason, Egeria was retained until 1911.

== Ships ==
Name	Ship builder	Launched	Fate
Fantome	Pembroke Dock	26 March 1873	Sold 1889
Albatross	Chatham Dockyard	24 July 1873	Scrapped 1889
Daring	Blackwall Yard, London	4 February 1874	Sold 1889
Egeria	Pembroke Dock	1 November 1873	Sold 1911
Flying Fish	Chatham Dockyard	27 November 1873	Sold 1888
Sappho	Money Wigram & Sons, Blackwall Yard	20 October 1873	Sold 1887

== Bibliography ==
- Ballard, G. A. (1939). "British Sloops of 1875: The Smaller Composite Type". Mariner's Mirror. 25 (April). Cambridge, UK: Society for Nautical Research: 151–61.
- Roberts, John (1979). "Great Britain and Empire Forces". In Chesneau, Roger & Kolesnik, Eugene M. (eds.). Conway's All the World's Fighting Ships 1860-1905. Greenwich, UK: Conway Maritime Press. ISBN 0-8317-0302-4.
- Lyon, David & Winfield, Rif (2004). The Sail and Steam Navy List: All the Ships of the Royal Navy 1815–1889. Chatham Publishing. ISBN 978-1-86176-032-6. OCLC 52620555.
