= Lister (surname) =

- Pronunciation: /ˈlɪstər/ LISS-tər

Origin
- Origin: English

Other names
- Variant forms: Lyster, Lester, Lestor, McInlester, McLeister, Laister, Litster, Lidster, Ledgister Ledster

Lister coat of arms, Thomas Lister of Westby, County York, England. Taken from "Lyster Pioneers of Lower Canada and the West", which credits Thomas Lyttleton Lyster Denny's 1913 work, "Memorials of an ancient house".

Lister is an English occupational surname, and may refer to a textile dyer, from the Middle English word "litster", meaning to dye. It dates back to the 13th century in Scotland with the recording of Aleyn le Littester of Edinburghshire who rendered homage to the Interregnum government in 1296, and to the 14th century in England (Richard le Lyster appears in the Subsidy Tax Rolls of Derbyshire in 1327).

The name probably comes from the Old Norse verb 'lita', meaning 'to dye' and rendered as 'lystare' in English. The noun for 'dyer' was 'litster' (Scottish), 'lit(t)e' (middle English), or 'lister' (English). The word was also associated with a 'salmon spear', rendered 'lyster' (Danish) or 'lister' (English). A 1533 Act of Parliament stated, "No person shall take in any crele, raw web, lister.... the young fry of salmon."

The name took hold in areas of England in the 16th century known for the woollen industry, mainly Yorkshire, but also Lancashire, Lincolnshire and Norfolk.

The name came to Ireland following the Cromwellian campaign of 1649, and took root in County Laois, rendered by the English as Queen's County.

== Spelling variants ==
The name's spellings include Lister (English and Scottish), Lyster (Irish), Lester, Lestor (English), McInlester, McLeister, Laister, Litster (Scottish), Lidster (Scottish), and the rare Ledgister and Ledster (Scottish).

Eswyn Lyster notes that, "It is often said that 'Lister' is the English name, while 'Lyster' is Irish, but both spellings are found in Ireland, often in the same family. In England 'Lyster' is seldom seen (save) to someone whose ancestors moved to Ireland and then returned. In Scotland the spelling (Fife County) is 'Litster' and 'Lidster', and tends to become 'Lister' in modern times'."

Whereas both 'Lister' and 'Lyster' rhyme with 'mister', in some areas of western Canada 'Lyster' is rendered as if spelt 'Lester'.

== Coat of arms and crest ==
Lister-Lyster crest, taken of a plaque held by a British Columbia Lyster family

There is no official registry that recognizes a Lister/Lyster coat of arms, but Listers of Yorkshire-descent use the one granted to John Lyster de Derby. It is a shield divided horizontally in three, the middle being black with three large white five-pointed stars. Six small staggered crosses with bell-bottomed bases are on the white strip at the top, and seven are on the bottom.

The crest which appears atop the coat of arms is a dagger impaling a laurel wreath, from Carlow Ireland (Queen's County). This is listed in Fairburn's Crests, designated "LYSTER, Ire."

The family motto is variously 'Retinens vestigia famae' (Following in the footsteps of fame), or 'Facta, non verba' (Deeds, not words).

== Lister ==
- Alton Lister, retired American professional basketball player
- Anne Lister, (1791–1840), Yorkshire landowner
- Anthony Lister, an Australian born painter and installation artist
- Arthur Lister, (1830–1908), English botanist
- Aynsley Lister, English blues guitarist
- Big Bill Lister, (1923–2009), Texas country and western singer, honkytonk singer
- Charles J. Lister, (1820–1912), a central figure in the Restoration Movement in 19th-century Canada
- Dave Lister (fictional character), character in the BBC television sitcom Red Dwarf
- David Cunliffe-Lister, 2nd Earl of Swinton
- David Lister (director), South African-born film director
- David Lister (origami historian)
- Dean Lister, an American mixed martial arts fighter and a former KOTC champion
- Elaine Lister (born 1962), Scottish wheelchair curler
- General Enrique Líster, Spanish Communist politician and military officer who took part in the Spanish Civil War and World War II
- Henrietta Lister (1895–1959), British race driver, dancer, and painter
- Hovie Lister, musician
- Hugh Lister, (1901–1944), an Anglican priest, trade union organizer, and combatant officer in World War II
- Jasmine Lister (born 1992), American basketball player
- Ensign Jeremy Lister, the youngest British officer at the Battle of Lexington and Concord
- Joseph Lister (1827–1912), British surgeon and pioneer of antiseptic surgery
- Joseph Jackson Lister (1786–1869), British amateur opticist and physicist; father of Joseph Lister
- Joseph Jackson Lister (naturalist) (1857–1927), British zoologist and plant collector
- Joseph Lister (VC) (1886–1963), received VC for actions at the Third Battle of Ypres
- Martin Lister, (1639–1712), English naturalist and physician
- Marquita Lister, American opera soprano
- Matthew Lister (died 1657)
- Moira Lister, British actress and writer
- Mosie Lister, U.S. musician
- Nicholas Cunliffe-Lister, 3rd Earl of Swinton
- Philip Cunliffe-Lister, 1st Earl of Swinton
- Richard Percival Lister, (R. P. Lister) British metallurgist, author, poet and painter
- S. E. Lister, British novelist
- Samuel Lister, 1st Baron Masham
- Sandy Lister, British hockey player and Olympic bronze medalist
- Steve Lister, English footballer
- Susan Cunliffe-Lister, Baroness Masham of Ilton
- Thomas Lister (regicide), (1597–1668), Colonel in English Parliamentary Army, English civil war
- Thomas Henry Lister, (1800–1842) English novelist and Registrar General
- Tommy Lister Jr. (1958–2020), American character actor and wrestler
- Toney J. Lister (born 1945), American politician
- W. Lister Lister (1859–1943), Australian artist

== See also ==
- Baron Lister, a British noble title that existed from 1897 to 1912
- Lester, related surname
- Lyster, related surname
- Geoffrey Litster, leader of a peasant uprising in Norfolk in 1381

== Known Lister/Lyster histories ==
- Lyster Pioneers of Lower Canada and the West, 1984 "The Lyster Family: The Canadian Lysters who Belong to the Lyster Family of Queen's County, Ireland", 1900 - James Lyster, Montreal, Canada
- Reverend Henry Littleton Lyster "Memorials of an Ancient House", 1913 - Sir Henry (Lyster) Denny (The Listers of Gisburn(e), Yorkshire, England)
- "The Lyster Family", 1973 - Helen Lyster Nash, Pasadena, California, USA. 1979. 275 pages. San Marino Printers, San Marino, CA HFG-Lyster-2. HFL 6677.
- Lyster Pioneers of Lower Canada and the West, 1984 - Eswyn Lyster, Qualicum Beach, British Columbia, Canada. 335 pages. Cartwright Printers, Courtenay, B.C. ISBN 0-9691833-0-5. HFG-Lyster-3.
