= Joseph Lister (disambiguation) =

Joseph Lister (1827–1912) was a British surgeon and pioneer of antiseptic surgery.

Joseph Lister may also refer to:

- Joseph Jackson Lister (1786–1869), his father, amateur British opticist and physicist
- Joseph Jackson Lister (naturalist) (1857–1927), British zoologist and plant collector
- Joseph Lister (VC) (1886–1963), sergeant in the British Army and recipient of the Victoria Cross
- Joseph Lister (cricketer) (1930–1991), cricketer
- Joseph Storr Lister (1852–1927), South African forester

== See also ==
- Lister (surname)
