= Gulielma Lister =

English mycologist and naturalist

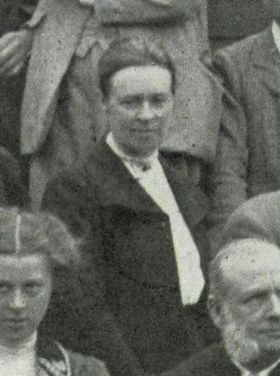
- Gulielma Lister, 1905
- Born: 28 October 1860; Leytonstone, Essex, UK
- Died: 18 May 1949 (aged 88); Leytonstone
- Known for: Authority on Mycetozoa
- Scientific career
- Fields: Mycology
- Workplaces: British Museum (NH)
- Author abbrev. (botany): G.Lister

Gulielma Lister (28 October 1860 – 18 May 1949) was a British botanist and mycologist who was considered an international authority on Mycetozoa.

== Life ==
Lister was born in Sycamore House, 881 High Road, Leytonstone (East London) on 28 October 1860, one of seven children of Susanna Tindall and Arthur Lister. She was born into a prominent Quaker family, being the granddaughter of J.J. Lister and niece of Lord Lister. Lister was educated at home save for one year at Bedford College for Women. It was this time in Bedford that gave Lister a grounding in systematic and structural botany. Lister's mother was a formally trained artist, which appears to have been part of Lister's home schooling.

Lister spent her life in Leytonstone, and the family summer house in Lyme Regis, where she conducted much of her field work. Lister died in the house where she was born on 18 May 1949, following a stroke. She is commemorated at grave number 07 at the Quaker Meeting House in Bush Road where her ashes were scattered.

== Botanical and mycological work ==
Lister's interest in natural history was due to her father, who although a wine merchant, dedicated much of his time to the study of Mycetozoa. She acted as his field and laboratory assistant in his work. Lister first helped her father in the compilation of his 1894 work A monograph of the Mycetozoa, going on to revise and expand the work with two further editions in 1911 and 1925. These further additions featured coloured plates of Lister's watercolour illustrations.

She also began working in the collections of British Museum (Natural History), London with her father around this time. In 1895 her father wrote the first edition of the Guide to the British Mycetozoa exhibited in the Department of Botany, British Museum (Natural History) with her help, and after his death she revised new editions of this guide. She never held an official appointment at the museum.

She was a contemporary of Annie Lorrain Smith and Ethel Barton. She catalogued and studied botanical collections in Kew Gardens, Natural History Museum, Paris, and the University of Strasbourg.

Lister was an active member of the British Mycological Society from 1903, being one of the first 100 founding members. She was president in 1912 and 1932, and her dedication to the group was recognised in 1924 when she was made an honorary member. She also served as President of the Essex Field Club from 1916-1919, the first woman to hold the position. After this she was the vice-president permanently. She was elected as one of the first women fellows of the Linnean Society of London in December 1904, a council member (1915–1917, 1927–1931) and vice-president (1929–1931). From 1917 until her death, Lister was a trustee of the Botanical Research Fund, and was chair of the School Nature Study Union for a number of years.

Lister corresponded with mycologists from all over the world, including the Emperor of Japan, who sent her a pair of enamel vases to thank her for her help in his studies. She travelled frequently with Alice Hibbert-Ware, naturalist and member of the Linnean Society of London, to Europe and New Zealand to birdwatch and study fungi. Lister learnt Polish to read the work of Jósef Tomasz Rostafinski in the study of British and European Myxogastria. She contributed to the Royal Irish Academy's Clare Island Survey, and is credited by Robert Lloyd Praeger in aiding in the advancement of Mycetozoa study in Ireland. Lister also had an interest in animals, birds and coniferous trees. She provided the illustrations for Dallimore and Jackson's Handbook of Coniferae and F. J. Hanbury's Illustrated Monograph of the British Hieracia.

Lister's botanical and mycological collections can be found in the Natural History Museum, London, Stratford Museum and Kew Gardens. She bequeathed 74 research notebooks to the British Mycological Society, which later were accessioned to the Natural History Museum, London, which documented the work Lister and her father had conducted on historical collections as well as their own. Her scientific illustrations are also recognized in the artwork collections of the museum.

== List of publications ==
- Lister, Arthur (1894). A monograph of the Mycetozoa, being a descriptive catalogue of the species in the herbarium of the British Museum. Illustrated with seventy-eight plates and fifty-one woodcuts. London: Trustees of the British Museum.
  - 2nd ed. (1911), revised and expanded with coloured plates by Gulielma Lister
  - 3rd ed. (1925), ibid.
- Lister, Arthur (1895). Guide to the British Mycetozoa exhibited in the Department of Botany, British Museum (Natural History). London: Trustees of the British Museum.
  - 2nd ed. (1903)
  - 3rd ed. (1909), revised by Gulielma Lister OCLC 561874740
  - 4th ed. (1919), revised by Gulielma Lister
- Lister, G. (1913). New mycetozoa. Journal of Botany 51: 1–4, tabs 524–525.
- Lister, G. (1913). Mycetozoa found during the Fungus Foray in the Forres District, 12 to 20 Sep 1912, with the description of a new species. Transactions of the British Mycological Society 4: 38–44, 1 plate.
- Lister, G (1913). "Mycetozoa found during the Fungus Foray at Haslemere, Sept. 23rd–26th, 1913". Transactions of the British Mycological Society. 4: 221–223. doi:10.1016/s0007-1536(12)80024-6.
- Lister, G (1915). "Mycetozoa found during the Fungus Foray in the neighbourhood of Doncaster, Sept. 22nd to 25th, 1914". Transactions of the British Mycological Society. 5: 18–20. doi:10.1016/s0007-1536(14)80006-5.
- Lister, G (1915). "Mycetozoa found in the Gower Peninsula, September 19 to October 2, 1915". Transactions of the British Mycological Society. 5: 208–210. doi:10.1016/s0007-1536(14)80024-7.
- Lister, G (1917). "Mycetozoa seen during the visit of the British Mycological Society to Shrewsbury, September 24th to 29th, 1917". Transactions of the British Mycological Society. 6 (1): 15–17. doi:10.1016/s0007-1536(17)80003-6.
- Lister, G (1919). "Mycetozoa found during the Selby Foray". Transactions of the British Mycological Society. 6 (2): 88–91. doi:10.1016/s0007-1536(17)80017-6.
- Lister, G (1920). "Mycetozoa found during the Baslow Foray". Transactions of the British Mycological Society. 6 (3): 248–252. doi:10.1016/s0007-1536(17)80034-6.
- Lister, G (1921). "New or rare species of Mycetoza". Journal of Botany, British and Foreign. 59: 89–93.
- Lister, G (1921). "Mycetozoa found during the Minehead Foray". Transactions of the British Mycological Society. 7 (1–2): 10–12. doi:10.1016/s0007-1536(21)80002-9.
- Lister, G (1922). "List of Mycetozoa found during the Worcester Foray". Transactions of the British Mycological Society. 8 (1–2): 8–9. doi:10.1016/s0007-1536(22)80002-4.
- Lister, G (1924). "Mycetozoa of the Windsor Foray". Transactions of the British Mycological Society. 10 (1–2): 8–9. doi:10.1016/s0007-1536(24)80002-5.
- Lister, G (1926). "Mycetozoa found during the Bettws-y-Coed Foray". Transactions of the British Mycological Society. 10 (4): 240–242. doi:10.1016/s0007-1536(26)80040-3.
- Lister, G (1926). "Mycetozoa of the Dublin Foray". Transactions of the British Mycological Society. 11 (1–2): 22–23. doi:10.1016/s0007-1536(26)80022-1.
- Lister, G (1927). "Mycetozoa gathered during the Hereford Foray". Transactions of the British Mycological Society. 12 (2–3): 86–87. doi:10.1016/s0007-1536(27)80002-1.
- Lister, G (1928). "Mycetozoa found during the Aviemore Foray". Transactions of the British Mycological Society. 13 (3–4): 312–313. doi:10.1016/s0007-1536(28)80027-1.
- Lister, G (1930). "Mycetozoa gathered during the Bristol Foray". Transactions of the British Mycological Society. 15 (1–2): 10–11. doi:10.1016/s0007-1536(30)80003-2.
- Lister, G (1932). "Mycetozoa of the Belfast Foray". Transactions of the British Mycological Society. 17 (1–2): 14–15. doi:10.1016/s0007-1536(32)80023-9.
- Lister, G (1933). "Mycetozoa found during the Haslemere Foray". Transactions of the British Mycological Society. 18 (1): 14–16. doi:10.1016/s0007-1536(33)80022-2.
- Lister, G (1934). "Mycetozoa found during the foray of the British Mycological Society at Newcastle, September 18th-21st, 1933". Transactions of the British Mycological Society. 19 (1): 10. doi:10.1016/s0007-1536(34)80003-4.
- Lister, G (1937). "Mycetozoa". Transactions of the British Mycological Society. 21 (1): 12. doi:10.1016/S0007-1536(37)80002-9.
- Lister, G (1938). "Mycetozoa found during the Killarney Foray". Transactions of the British Mycological Society. 22 (1–2): 13. doi:10.1016/s0007-1536(38)80004-8.

== See also ==
- Timeline of women in science
