= Lyster =

Lyster is a surname, and may refer to:

- Anthony George Lyster (1852–1920), British civil engineer, son of George Fosbery Lyster
- Arthur Edward Lyster (1858–1928), Irish mathematician, astronomer and educator
- Cecil Lyster (1859–1920), British radiologist
- Eswyn Lyster (1923–2009), Canadian writer
- George Fosbery Lyster (1821–1899), Irish civil engineer, brother of James Lyster
- Harry Lyster (1830–1922), Irish Bengal Army soldier, recipient of the Victoria Cross
- Henry Lyster (1862–1932), Irish Anglican cleric
- James Lyster (1810–1891), Church of Ireland priest
- John Lyster (1850–1911), Irish Catholic priest
- Lauren Lyster (born 1981), American journalist
- Lumley Lyster (1888–1957), Royal Navy Vice-Admiral
- Maggie Coles-Lyster (born 1999), Canadian cyclist
- Margery Lyster (died 1565), English courtier
- Maureen Lyster (born 1943), Australian politician
- Michael Lyster (1954–2026), Irish radio and television broadcaster
- Neil Lyster (born 1947), New Zealand cyclist
- Pat Lyster (1913–2002), South African rugby union footballer
- Richard Lyster (c.1480–1554), English judge
- Richard Lyster (Shropshire) (c.1691–1766), British landowner and politician
- Scott Lyster (born 1987), Canadian actor
- Ted de Lyster (born 1947), Australian soccer player
- Theodore C. Lyster (1875–1933), United States Army chief surgeon and researcher
- Thomas Lyster (Cavalier) (1612–1655), English Royalist
- Thomas William Lyster (1855–1922), Irish librarian
- William Saurin Lyster (1828–1880), Australian impresario

== See also ==
- Lister (surname)
