= Alice Cameron =

English educator (1891 – 1964)

Alice Mackenzie Cameron (1891 – 1964) was a British educator who campaigned against unemployment.

Cameron studied at Somerville College, Oxford in 1910, and received her BA and MA in 1920. She became a tutor for the Oxford University Extension Delegacy when one of her professors, Sandie Lindsay, gave her some of his philosophy classes to teach. Her career lay in adult education, including giving women-only classes.

In 1927, she founded the Lincoln People's Service Club to support men unemployed during the Great Depression. Her other activities with the Workers' Educational Association involved leading a protest against the withholding of coal from unemployed families in 1934 alongside Mary Toomer.

She was the author of Civilisation and the Unemployed and In pursuit of justice: the story of Hugh Lister and his friends in Hackney Wick.
