= Arthur Lister =

English botanist (1830–1908)

Arthur Hugh Lister
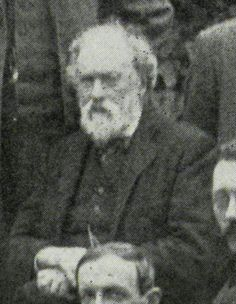
- Lister in 1905
- Born: 17 April 1830; Upton House, Uptown, Essex, England
- Died: 10 July 1908 (aged 78)
- Known for: Contributions to taxonomy of Mycetozoa
- Scientific career
- Fields: Botany

Arthur Hugh Lister FRS (1830–1908) was a wine merchant and botanist, known for his research on Mycetozoa also known as slime molds.

== Life ==
Lister was born in Upton House, Upton, Essex. He was the youngest son of Joseph Jackson Lister, a brother of the celebrated Joseph Lister, and father of the mycologist and botanical illustrator Gulielma Lister. He was educated at Hitchin and left school at sixteen to go into business. He became a partner in a company of wine merchants and retired from business in 1888.

He did research on the Mycetozoa, publishing in the 'Annals of Botany', the 'Journal' of the Linnean Society, and the 'Proceedings' of the Essex Field Club, in reference to the species and life-history of these organisms. His principal work, 'A Monograph of the Mycetozoa' (with 78 plates), issued by the trustees of the British Museum in 1894, is an exhaustive catalogue of the species in the national herbarium. He was also the compiler of the museum's 'Guide to the British Mycetozoa' (1895).

He was elected a fellow of the Linnean Society in 1873 and was the Society's vice-president in 1895–1896. He was president of the Mycological Society in 1906–1907. He married in 1855 and was the father of four daughters and three sons, one of whom was the zoologist Joseph Jackson Lister. Much of Arthur Lister's scientific work was done in collaboration with his daughter Gulielma. On 9 June 1898, Lister was elected to the fellowship of the Royal Society.

He was honoured in 1901, when botanists Penzig & P.A.Saccardo published Listeromyces, Then in 1906, Eduard Adolf Wilhelm Jahn published Listerella paradoxa which is a slime mould species from the class Myxogastria and the only member of its genus, as well as the family Listerelliidae.
