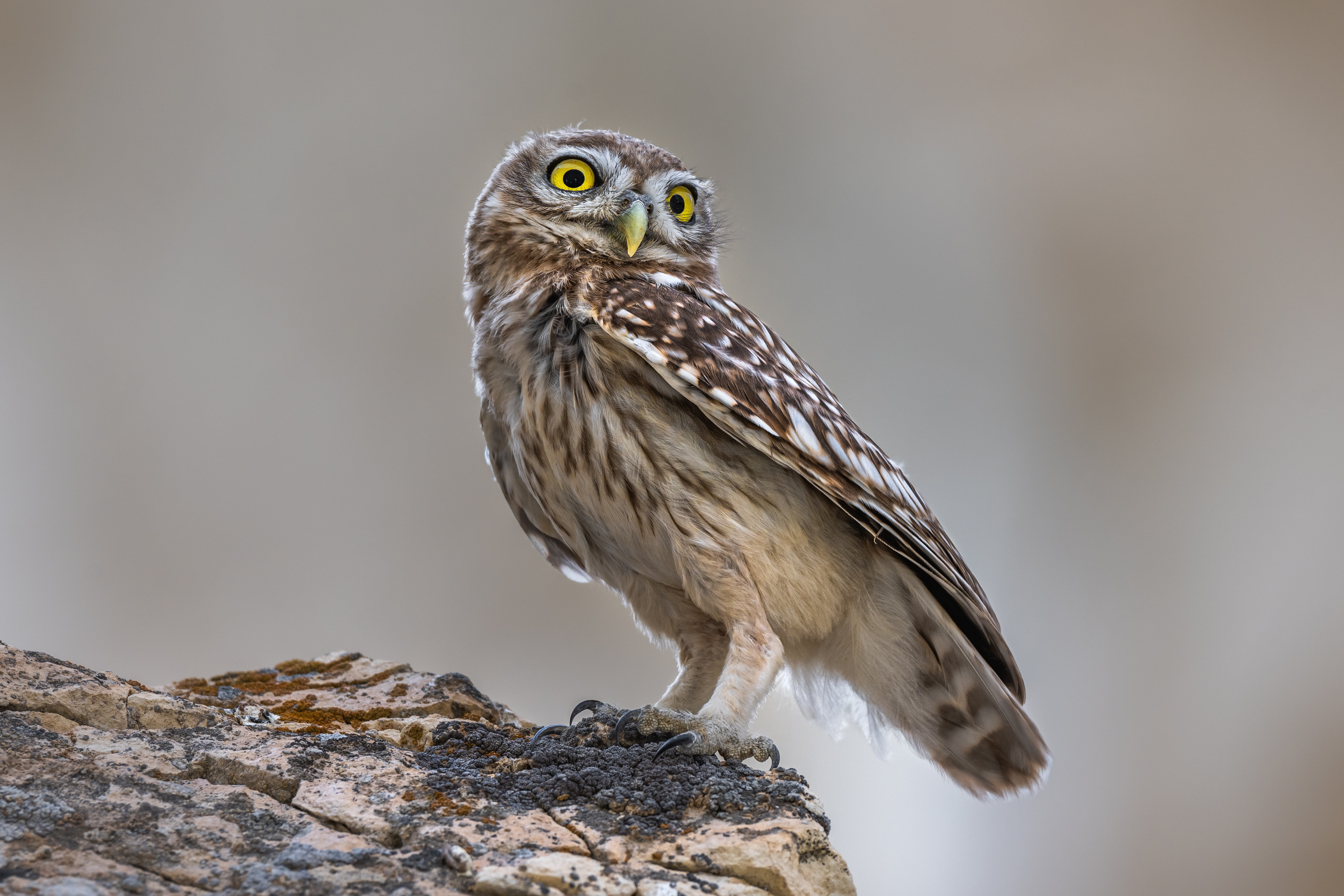
- In Kazakhstan

Conservation status
- Least Concern (IUCN 3.1)
- CITES Appendix II

Scientific classification
- Kingdom: Animalia
- Phylum: Chordata
- Class: Aves
- Order: Strigiformes
- Family: Strigidae
- Genus: Athene
- Species: A. noctua

Binomial name
- Athene noctua (Scopoli, 1769)
- Range of the little owl Resident Extant & introduced (resident)

Synonyms
- Carine noctua

Audio

= Little owl =

Species of owl

3D scan of little owl skeleton

The little owl (Athene noctua), also known as the owl of Athena or owl of Minerva, is a bird that inhabits much of the temperate and warmer parts of Europe, the Palearctic east to Korea, and North Africa. It was introduced into Britain at the end of the 19th century and into the South Island of New Zealand in the early 20th century.

This owl is a member of the typical or true owl family Strigidae, which contains most species of owl, the other grouping being the barn owls, Tytonidae. It is a small (approx. 22 cm long), cryptically coloured, mainly nocturnal species and is found in a range of habitats including farmland, woodland fringes, steppes and semi-deserts. It feeds on insects, earthworms, other invertebrates and small vertebrates. Males hold territories that they defend against intruders. This owl is a cavity nester, and a clutch of about four eggs is laid in spring. The female does the incubation and the male brings food to the nest, first for the female and later for the newly hatched young. As the chicks grow, both parents hunt and bring them food, and the chicks leave the nest at about seven weeks of age.

Being a common species with a wide range and large total population, the International Union for Conservation of Nature has assessed its conservation status as "least concern".

== Taxonomy ==
The little owl was formally described in 1769 by the Italian naturalist Giovanni Antonio Scopoli under the binomial name Strix noctua. The little owl is now placed in the genus Athene that was introduced by the German zoologist Friedrich Boie in 1822. The owl was designated as the type species of the genus by George Robert Gray in 1841.

The genus name, Athene, commemorates the Greek goddess Athena (whose name is also at times spelled Athene), as the owl was a symbol of wisdom. The species name noctua has, in effect, the same meaning, being the Latin name of an owl sacred to Minerva, Athena's Roman counterpart.

The little owl is probably most closely related to the spotted owlet (Athene brama). A number of variations occur over the bird's wide range, and there is some dispute over their taxonomy. The most distinct is the pale grey-brown Middle-Eastern type known as the Syrian little owl (A. n. lilith). A 2009 paper in the ornithological journal Dutch Birding (vol. 31: 35–37, 2009) has advocated splitting the southeastern races as a separate species, Lilith's owl (Athene glaux), with subspecies A. g. glaux, A. g. indigena, and A. g. lilith. DNA evidence and vocal patterns support this proposal.

=== Subspecies ===
Other forms include another pale race, the north African A. n. desertae, and three intermediate subspecies, A. n. indigena of southeast Europe and Asia Minor, A. n. glaux in north Africa and southwest Asia, and A. n. bactriana of central Asia. Differences in size of bird and length of toes, reasons put forward for splitting off A. n. spilogastra, seem inconclusive; A. n. plumipes has been claimed to differ genetically from other members of the species and further investigation is required. In general, the different varieties both overlap with the ranges of neighbouring groups and intergrade (hybridise) with them across their boundaries.

Thirteen subspecies are recognised:

- A. n. vidalii Brehm, AE, 1857 – west Europe
- A. n. noctua (Scopoli, 1769) – central, south, southeast Europe to northwest Russia
- A. n. indigena Brehm, CL, 1855 – Romania to Greece through Ukraine and Turkey east to south Russia
- A. n. lilith Hartert, E, 1913 – Cyprus, south Turkey to Iraq and the Sinai (Egypt)
- A. n. bactriana Blyth, 1847 – Iraq and Azerbaijan to Pakistan and northwest India
- A. n. orientalis Severtsov, 1873 – northeast Kazakhstan and northwest China
- A. n. ludlowi Baker, ECS, 1926 – Himalayas
- A. n. impasta Bangs & Peters, JL, 1928 – west-central China
- A. n. plumipes Swinhoe, 1870 – Mongolia, south-central Siberia and northeast China
- A. n. glaux (Savigny, 1809) – coastal north Africa to southwest Israel
- A. n. saharae (Kleinschmidt, 1909) – Morocco to west Egypt and central Arabia
- A. n. spilogastra (Heuglin, 1863) – east Sudan, Eritrea and northeast Ethiopia
- A. n. somaliensis Reichenow, 1905 – east Ethiopia and Somalia

== Description ==
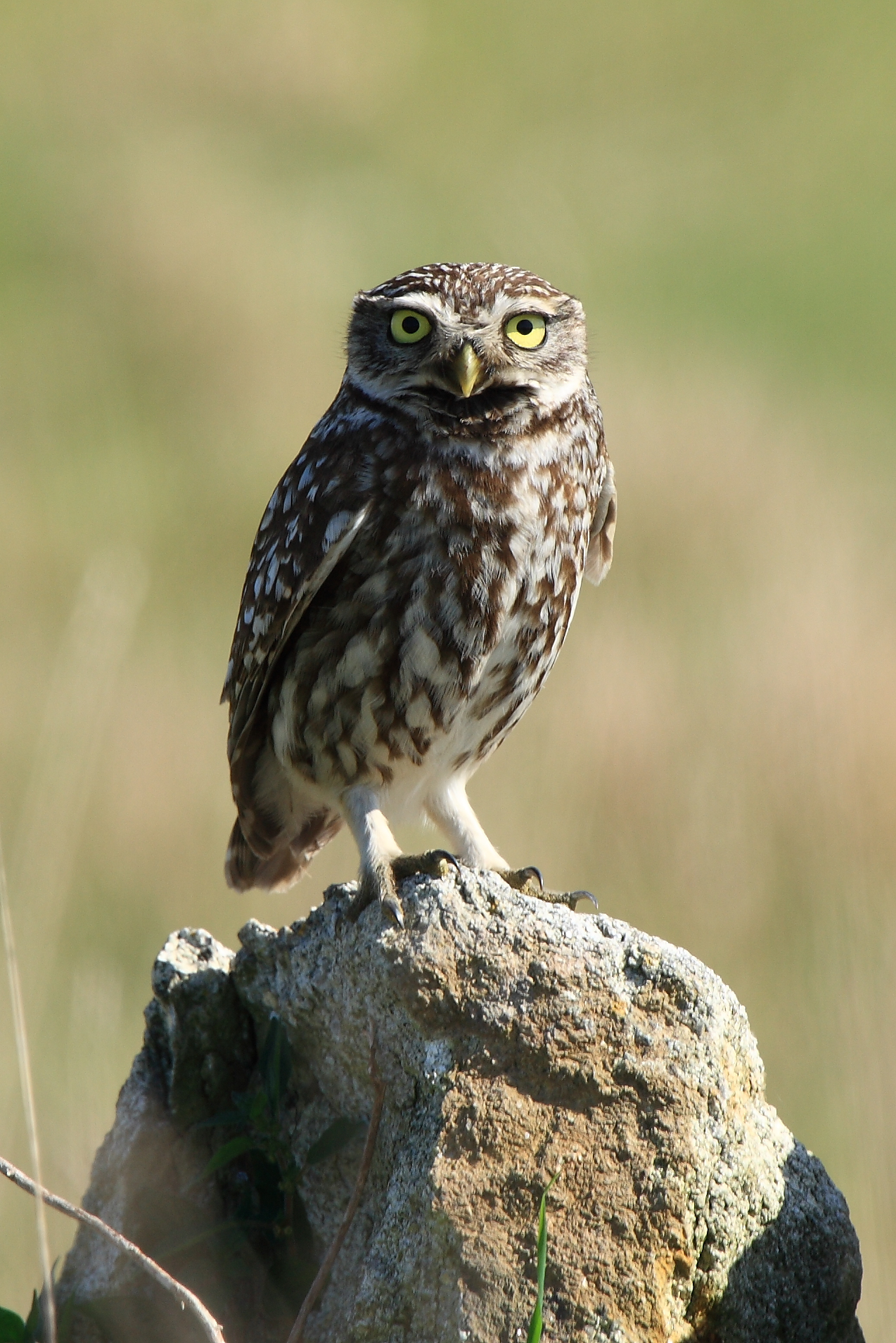
A. n. vidalii, in Spain

The little owl is a small owl with a flat-topped head, a plump, compact body and a short tail. The facial disc is flattened above the eyes giving the bird a frowning expression. The plumage is greyish-brown, spotted, streaked and barred with white. The underparts are pale and streaked with darker colour. It is usually 22 cm (8.7 in) in length with a wingspan of 56 cm (22 in) for both sexes, and weighs about 180 g (6.3 oz).

The adult little owl of the most widespread form, the nominate A. n. noctua, is white-speckled brown above, and brown-streaked white below. It has a large head, long legs, and yellow eyes, and its white "eyebrows" give it a stern expression. Juveniles are duller, and lack the adult's white crown spots. This species has a bounding flight like a woodpecker. Moult begins in July and continues to November, with the male starting before the female.

The call is a querulous kiew, kiew. Less frequently, various whistling or trilling calls are uttered. In the breeding season, other more modulated calls are made, and a pair may call in duet. Various yelping, chattering or barking sounds are made in the vicinity of the nest.

== Distribution and habitat ==
A. n. glaux, Egypt

The little owl is widespread across Europe, Asia and North Africa. Its range in Eurasia extends from the Iberian Peninsula and Denmark eastwards to China and southwards to the Himalayas. In Africa it is present from Mauritania to Egypt, the Red Sea and Arabia. It was introduced to the United Kingdom in the 19th century, and has spread across much of England and the whole of Wales. It was introduced to Otago in New Zealand by the local acclimatisation society in 1906, and to Canterbury a little later, and is now widespread in the eastern and northern South Island; it is partially protected under Schedule 2 of New Zealand's Wildlife Act 1953, whereas most introduced birds explicitly have no protection or are game birds.

This is a sedentary species that is found in open countryside in a great range of habitats. These include agricultural land with hedgerows and trees, orchards, woodland verges, parks and gardens, as well as steppes and stony semi-deserts. It is also present in treeless areas such as dunes, and in the vicinity of ruins, quarries and rocky outcrops. It sometimes ventures into villages and suburbs. In the United Kingdom, it is chiefly a bird of the lowlands, and usually occurs below 500 m (1,600 ft). In continental Europe and Asia, it may be found at much higher elevations; one individual was recorded from 3,600 m (12,000 ft) in Tibet.

== Behaviour and ecology ==
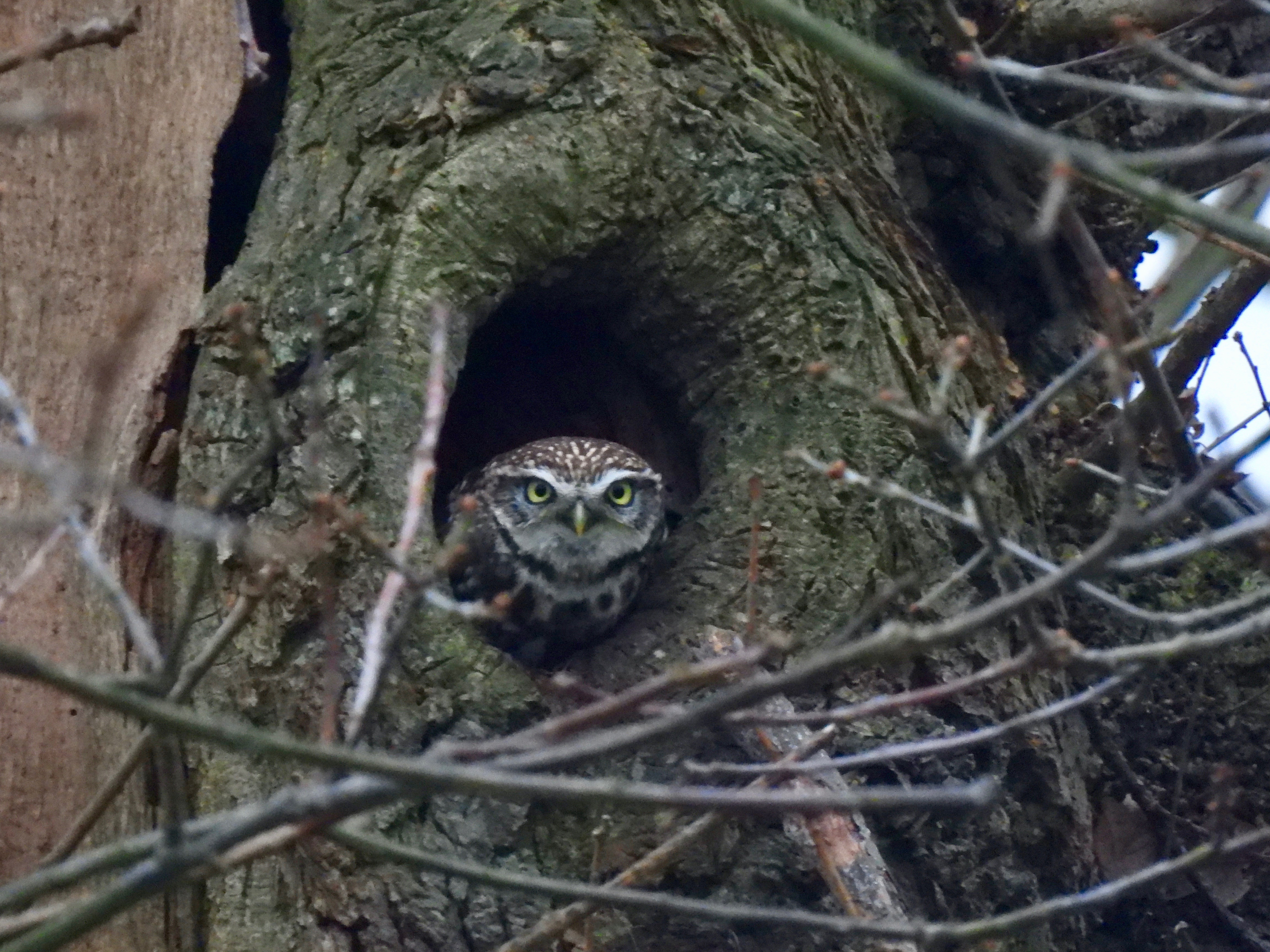
In England. Little owls often nest in tree hollows

This owl usually perches in an elevated position ready to swoop down on any small creature it notices. It feeds on prey such as insects and earthworms, as well as small vertebrates including amphibians, reptiles, birds and mammals. It may pursue prey on the ground and it caches surplus food in holes or other hiding places. A study of the pellets of indigestible material that the birds regurgitate found mammals formed 20–50% of the diet and insects 24 to 49%. Mammals taken included mice, rats, voles, squirrels, shrews, moles and rabbits. The birds were mostly taken during the breeding season and were often fledglings, and including the chicks of game birds. The insects included Diptera, Dermaptera, Coleoptera, Lepidoptera and Hymenoptera. Some vegetable matter (up to 5%) was included in the diet and may have been ingested incidentally.

The little owl is territorial, the male normally remaining in one territory for life. However, the boundaries may expand and contract, being largest in the courtship season in spring. The home range, in which the bird actually hunts for food, varies with the type of habitat and time of year. Little owls with home-ranges that incorporate a high diversity of habitats are much smaller (< 2 ha) than those that breed in monotonous farmland (with home-ranges over 12 ha). Larger home-ranges result in increased flight activity, longer foraging trips and fewer nest visits. If a male intrudes into the territory of another, the occupier approaches and emits its territorial calls. If the intruder persists, the occupier flies at him aggressively. If this is unsuccessful, the occupier repeats the attack, this time trying to make contact with his claws. In retreat, an owl often drops to the ground and makes a low-level escape. The territory is more actively defended against a strange male as compared to a known male from a neighbouring territory; it has been shown that the little owl can recognise familiar birds by voice.

The little owl is partly diurnal and often perches boldly and prominently during the day. If living in an area with a large amount of human activity, little owls may grow used to humans and will remain on their perch, often in full view, while people are around. The little owl has a life expectancy of about 16 years. However, many birds do not reach maturity; severe winters can take their toll and some birds are killed by road vehicles at night, so the average lifespan may be on the order of 3 years.

=== Breeding ===
This owl becomes more vocal at night as the breeding season approaches in late spring. The nesting location varies with habitat, nests being found in holes in trees, in cliffs, quarries, walls, old buildings, river banks and rabbit burrows. A clutch of three to five eggs is laid (occasionally two to eight). The eggs are broadly elliptical, white and without gloss; they measure about 35.5 by 29.5 mm (1.40 by 1.16 in). They are incubated by the female who sometimes starts sitting after the first egg is laid. While she is incubating the eggs, the male brings food for her. The eggs hatch after 28 or 29 days. At first, the chicks are brooded by the female, and the male brings in food which she distributes to them. Later, both parents are involved in hunting and feeding them. The young leave the nest at about 7 weeks, and can fly a week or two later. There is usually a single brood, but when food is abundant, there may be two. The energy reserves that little owl chicks are able to build up when in the nest influence their post-fledgling survival, with birds in good physical condition having a much higher chance of survival than those in poor condition. When the young disperse, they seldom travel more than about 20 km (12 mi). Pairs of birds often remain together all year round and the bond may last until one partner dies.

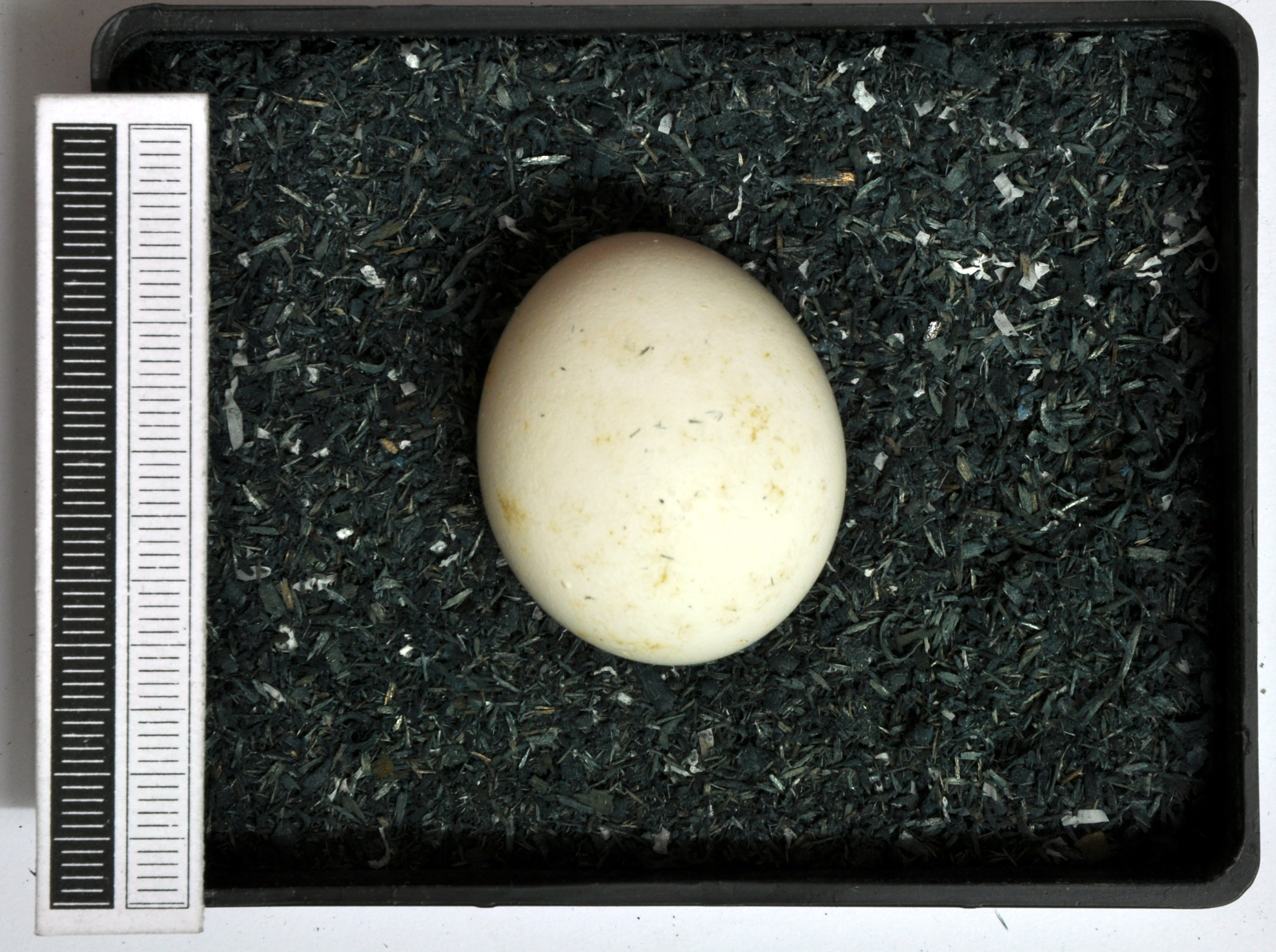
Little owl egg in Museum Wiesbaden

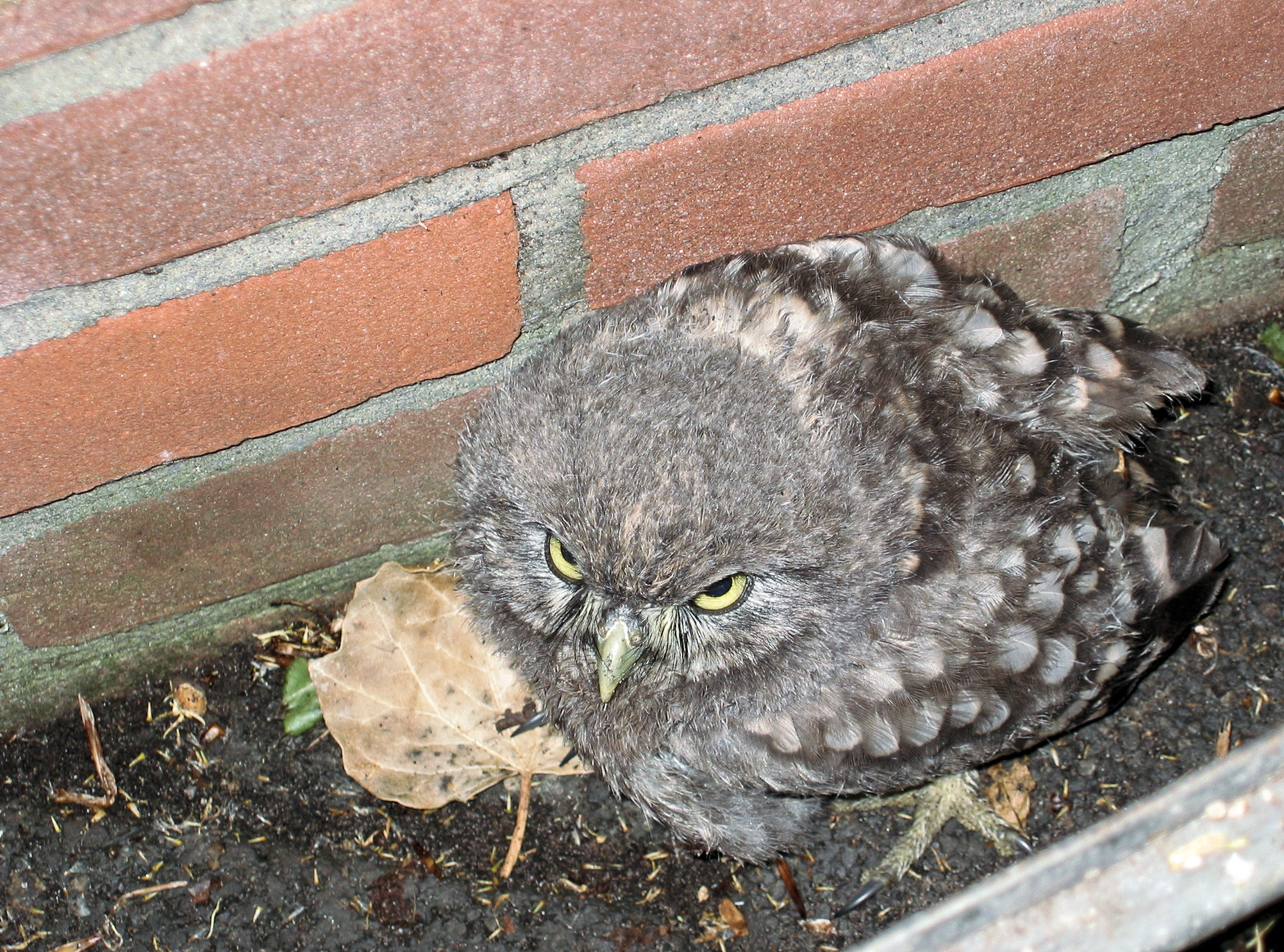
Juvenile

== Conservation status ==
A. noctua has an extremely large range. It has been estimated that there are between 560 thousand and 1.3 million breeding pairs in Europe, and as Europe equates to 25–49% of the global range, the world population may be between 5 million and 15 million birds. The population is believed to be stable, and for these reasons, the International Union for Conservation of Nature has assessed the bird's conservation status as being of "least concern".

== In human culture ==
Owls have often been depicted from the Upper Palaeolithic onwards, in forms from statuettes and drawings to pottery and wooden posts, but in the main they are generic rather than identifiable to species. The little owl is, however, closely associated with the Greek goddess Athena and the Roman goddess Minerva, and hence represents wisdom and knowledge. A little owl with an olive branch appears on a Greek tetradrachm coin from 500 BC (a copy of which appears on the modern Greek one-euro coin) and in a 5th-century BC bronze statue of Athena holding the bird in her hand. The call of a little owl was thought to have heralded the murder of Julius Caesar.

In 1843, several little owls that had been brought from Italy were released by the English naturalist Charles Waterton on his estate at Walton Hall in Yorkshire, but these failed to establish themselves. Later successful introductions were made by Lord Lilford on his Lilford Hall estate near Oundle in Northamptonshire and by Edmund Meade-Waldo at Stonewall Park near Edenbridge, Kent. From these areas the birds spread and had become abundant by 1900. The owls acquired a bad reputation and were believed to prey on game bird chicks. They therefore became a concern to game breeders who tried to eliminate them. In 1935, the British Trust for Ornithology initiated a study into the little owl's diet led by the naturalist Alice Hibbert-Ware. The report showed that the owls feed almost entirely on insects, other invertebrates and small mammals and thus posed little threat to game birds.

There is evidence that from the 19th century, little owls were occasionally kept as ornamental birds. In Italy, tamed and docked little owls were kept to hunt rodents and insects in the house and garden.

More common was keeping little owls to use them in so-called cottage hunting. This took advantage of the fact that many bird species react to owls with aggressive behaviour when they discover them during the day (mobbing). Such huntings, particularly with tawny owls, were practiced in Italy from 350 BC until the 20th century and in Germany from the 17th to the 20th century. In Italy, mainly skylarks were caught in this way. The main place of trade was Crespina, a small town near Pisa. Here, little owls were traditionally sold on 29 September, after being taken from their nests and raised in human care. Only since the 1990s has this trade been officially banned; however, because of the long cultural tradition for hunting with little owls, exemptions are still granted. Thus, there is still a breeding center for little owls near Crespina, which is maintained by hunters.

In 1992, the little owl appeared as a watermark on Jaap Drupsteen's 100 guilder banknote for the Netherlands.

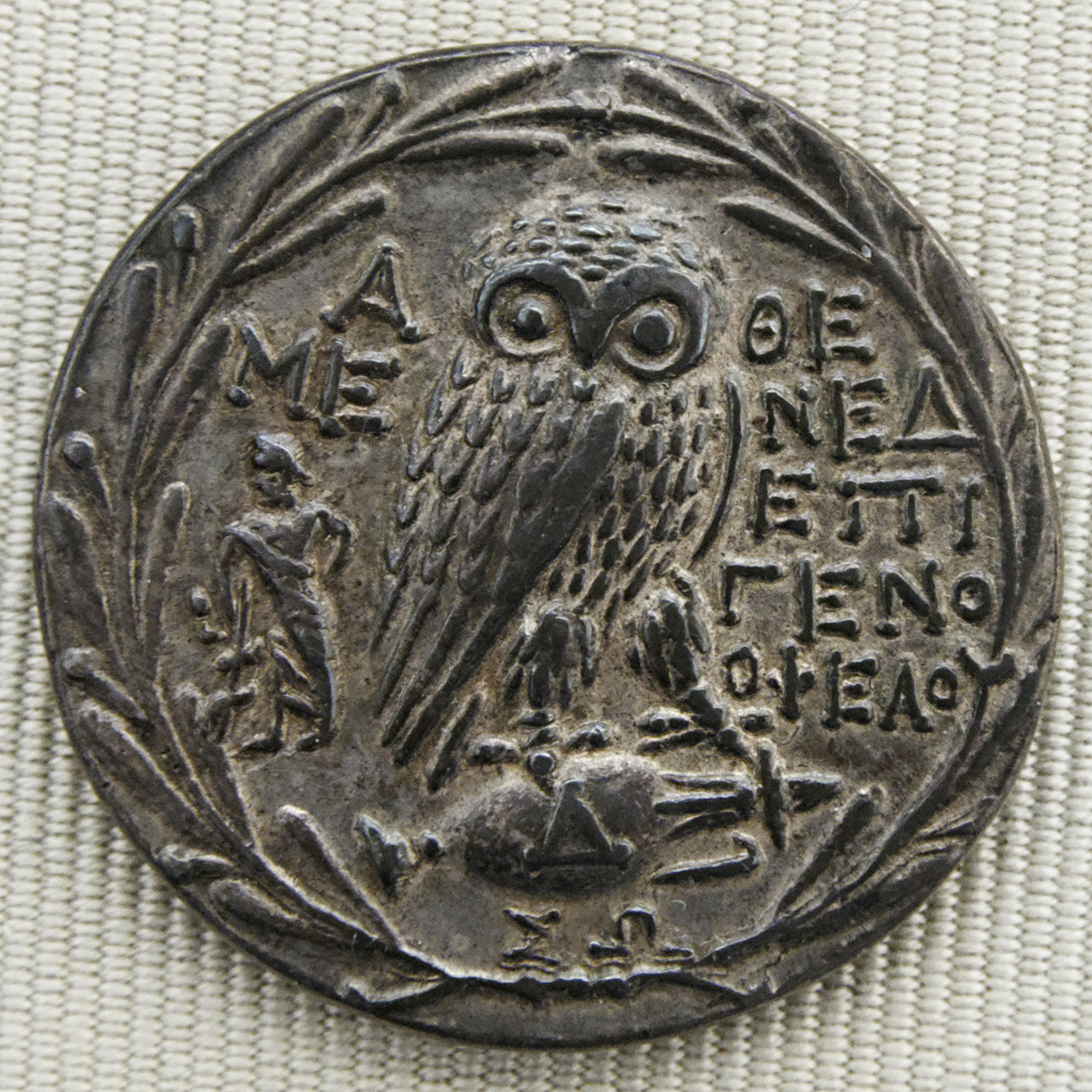
Little owl surrounded by an olive wreath, on the reverse of an Athenian silver tetradrachm (c. 175 BC)

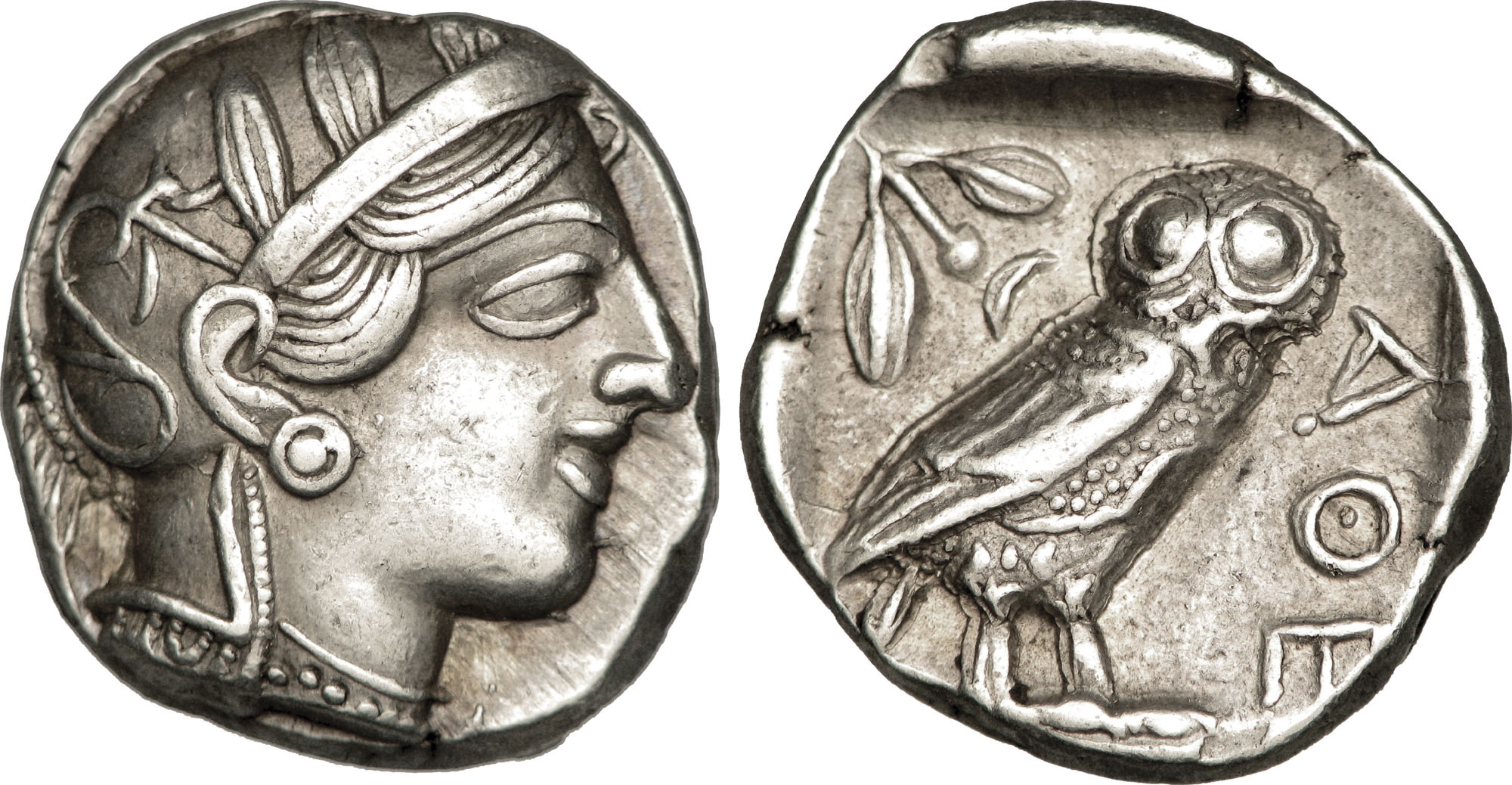
Athenian tetradrachm with the goddess Athena and a little owl and olive branch on the reverse. The lettering ΑΘΕ ("ATHE[NA]") is visible on the right.

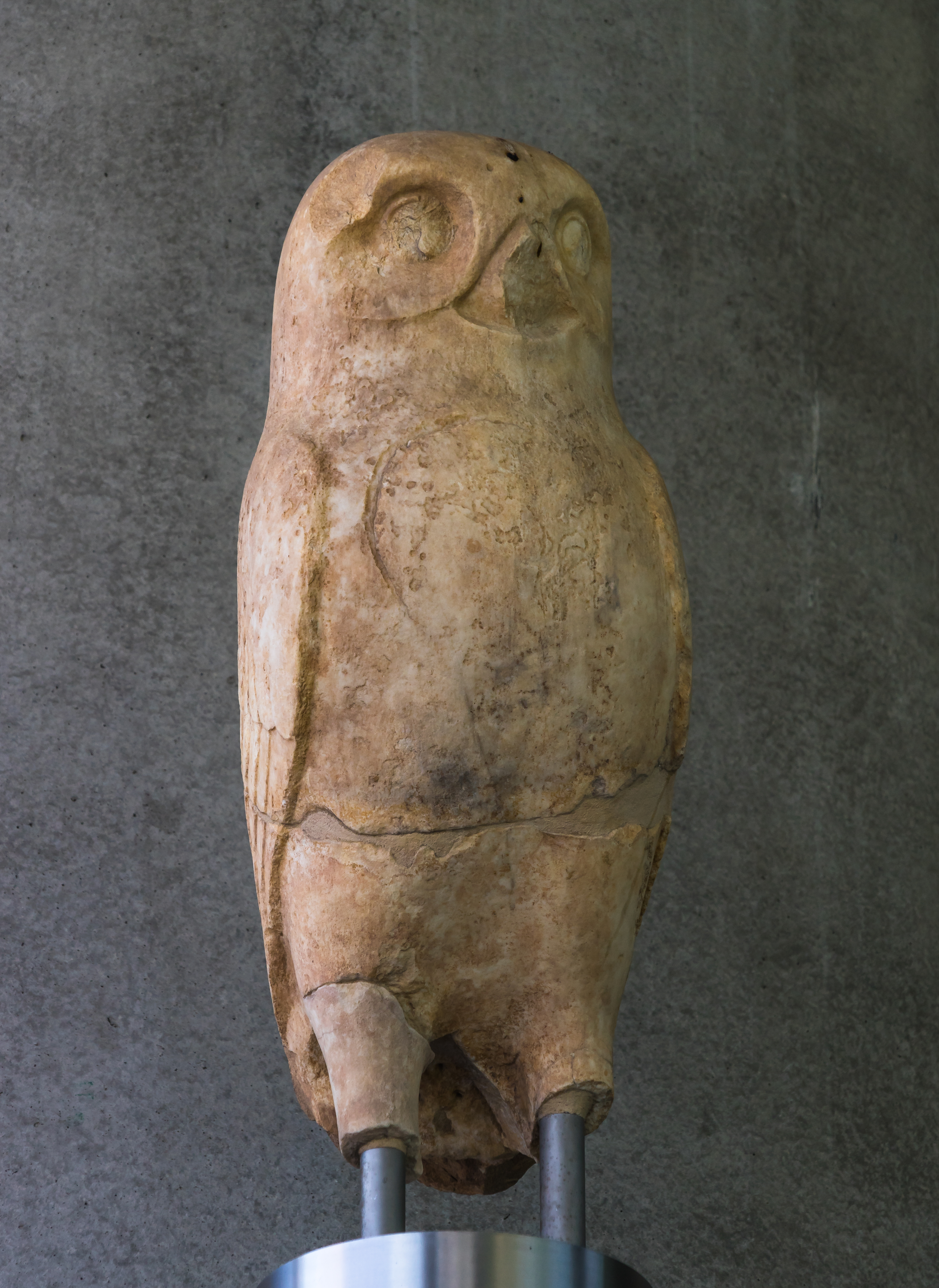
Owl statue in the Acropolis Museum, Athens (5th century BC)
