= Hechtel-Eksel =

- Municipality
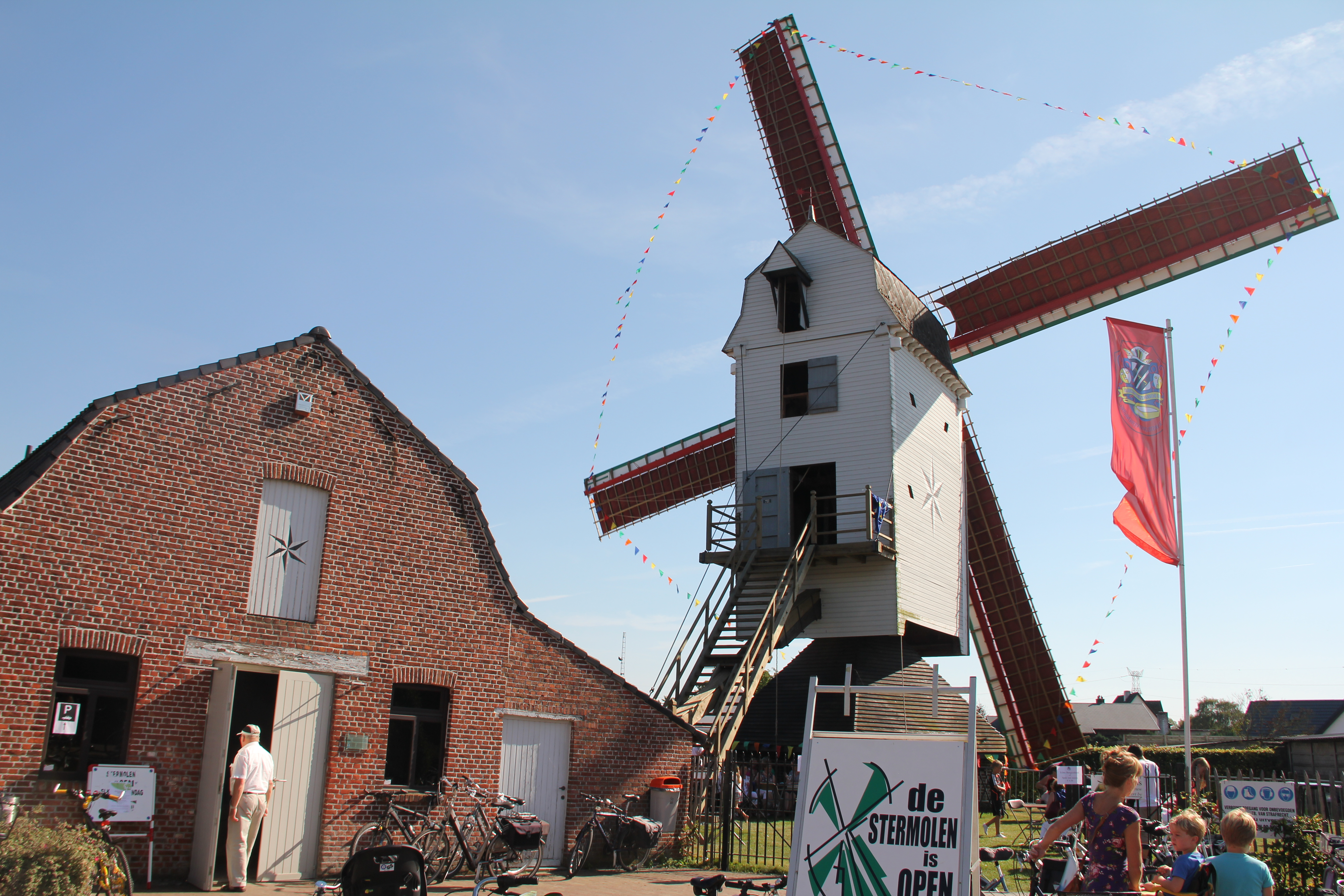

- Flag Coat of arms

- Location of Hechtel-Eksel in Limburg
- Interactive map of Hechtel-Eksel
- Location in Belgium
- Coordinates: 51°07′N 05°22′E
- Country: Belgium
- Community: Flemish Community
- Region: Flemish Region
- Province: Limburg
- Arrondissement: Maaseik

Government
  - Mayor: Jan Daelemans (HE)
  - Governing party: HE lijst burgemeester

Area
  - Total: 76.68 km^{2} (29.61 sq mi)

Population (2018-01-01)
  - Total: 12,290
  - Density: 160.3/km^{2} (415.1/sq mi)
- Postal codes: 3940-3941
- NIS code: 72038
- Area codes: 011
- Website: www.hechtel-eksel.be

Hechtel-Eksel (Dutch pronunciation: [ˈɦɛxtəl ˈɛksəl]) is a municipality located in the Belgian province of Limburg. On 1 January 2018 it had a total population of 12,290 an area of 76.70 km^{2} giving a population density of 150 inhabitants per km^{2}.

The municipality was created in January 1977 as a merger of the two former municipalities Hechtel and Eksel.

== Events ==
Hechtel was home to the "KBC Night of Athletics", a yearly international athletics meeting, and the annual International Airshow at Sanicole Airport, taking place in September.

== Battle of Hechtel ==
For seven days during World War II, from 6 to 12 September 1944, the town of Hechtel became the front line between German and British troops in what is known as the battle of Hechtel. German troops consisted of the 2nd Hermann Göring Tank Regiment. The 1st battalion was in Hechtel, with the 2nd placed 2km to the east in Wijchmaal. British forces were from the 1st and 2nd Battalion Welsh Guards, Irish Guards, Scots Guards 'X'-Company, Grenadier Guards and other supporting units.

During the battle, 62 British and 127 German soldiers were killed with another 250 captured. Thirty-five civilians also lost their lives with most being executed by German troops. The town centre was heavily damaged.

The battle ended on 12 September when the Irish Guards flanked the Germans, took a strategic bridge isolating the German forces.

A German Jagdpanther tank destroyer knocked out during this battle in on display at the Imperial War Museum Duxford - although its exact provenance is uncertain, it is claimed to be one knocked out by Hugh Griffiths and was previously at the Imperial War Museum London. The battle is commemorated every year on the 2nd Sunday of September.

Hechtel was the site of the death of the famous Anglican priest Hugh Lister, who served as a combatant officer in the Welsh Guards.
