= Alice Hibbert-Ware =

New Zealand born naturalist

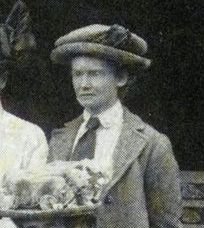
- Hibbert-Ware in a group photo at the British Mycological Society in 1913
- Born: 1869; Geraldine, New Zealand
- Died: 29 January 1944 (aged 74–75)

Academic work
- Notable works: Report of the Little Owl Food Inquiry

Alice Hibbert-Ware (1869–1944) was a New Zealand-born naturalist and educator, who is particularly notable for her research and report on the Little Owl and described as one of the "unsung heroines of modern ecology."

== Biography ==
Hibbert-Ware was born in Geraldine in the South Island of New Zealand in 1869. She moved to Cheltenham, England after the death of her father, along with her mother, brother and five sisters. From age 13, Hibbert-Ware attended Cheltenham Ladies' College where she took an interest in science. She became a teacher and regularly travelled in Europe and New Zealand birdwatching with Gulielma Lister.

Lister and Hibbert-Ware were some of the first women elected to the Linnean Society. She was also a member of Essex Field Club, the British Mycological Society, London Natural History Society, and was on the Council of the School Nature Study Union. Hibbert-Ware regularly wrote for the School Nature Study Union, sharing her observations to teachers.

During the First World War, Hibbert-Ware took on the role of curator for the Museum of St George's in the East in Stepney. In 1919, Hibbert-Ware moved to "White Cottage" on the edge of Epping Forest.

In 1931, after Hibbert-Ware's sister-in-law died, she moved to Girton, Cambridgeshire to care for her brother, a vicar. During this time, she was the manager of a nearby village school, Impington Village College.

She died on 29 January 1944 in Girton, Cambridgeshire.

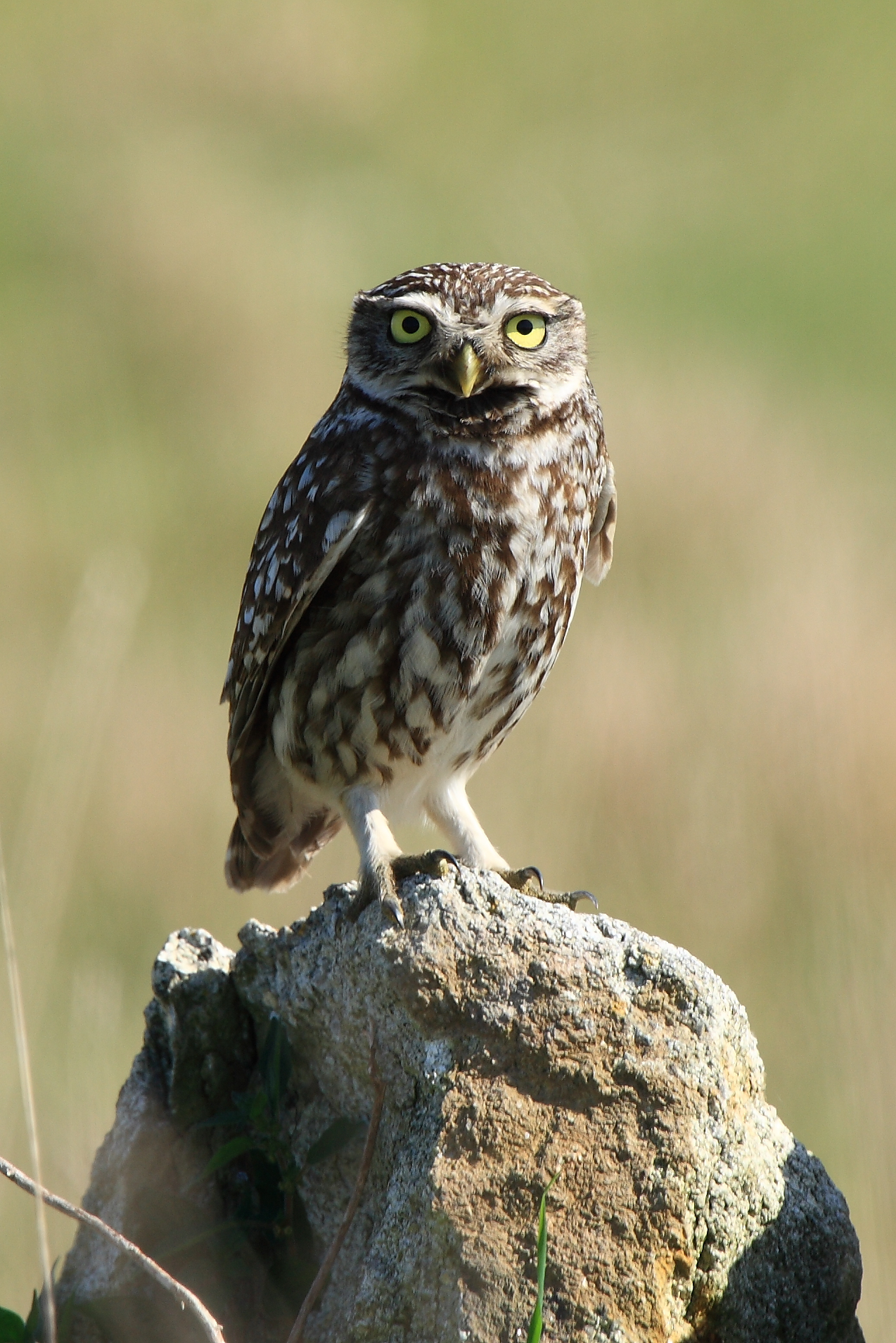
Little Owl (Athene noctua)

=== The Little Owl Food Inquiry ===
Hibbert-Ware is most notable for her ornithological research into the Little Owl's feeding habits. She first published her observations of the Little Owl in 1918. In the 1930s, there was a campaign, largely by the hunting groups including British Field Sports Society, to remove the Little Owl from the list of protected birds, with the accusation that they killed chicks of poultry and game birds. By 1936, the Little Owl had been removed from the protected list from fifteen counties under the approval of the Home Office. Hibbert-Ware was asked by the British Trust for Ornithology to lead an inquiry from 1936 to 1937. Her research involved the analysis of 2460 pellets, 76 nests and larders and 28 gizzards. She wrote in her report that only two game chicks and seven poultry chicks were taken during the 16 months studied and that the Little Owl fed largely on insects year round and some small rodents. As a newspaper at the time put it "the Little Owl was found 'not guilty'" of killing songbirds or chicks as a result of her report. Ministry of Agriculture accepted her report and, via the Home Office, sent sending a memorandum to every local authority stating that "the Little Owl is to be ranked with other Owls as a very useful bird."

== Honours ==
In 1948, a wildlife garden was set up in her memory in Girton, Cambridgeshire, opposite the church.

== Publications ==
- Hibbert-Ware, A. (1922). Notes on the Gizzard Contents of Birds Collected by Mr. Miller Christy. The Essex Naturalist, 20: 142–150.
- Hibbert-Ware, A. (1934). The Food of the Little Owl. Cambridge Bird Club Report, 1934: 23–25.
- Hibbert-Ware, A. (1936). Report of an Investigation of the Food of Captive Little Owls. British Birds, 29: 302–305.
- Hibbert-Ware, A. (1938). Birds of Girton College Grounds. Girton Review, 107: 3- 9.
- Hibbert-Ware, A. (1938). Report of the Little Owl Food Inquiry 1936–37. British Birds, 31: 162–187, 205–229, 249–264.
- Hibbert-Ware, A (1940). An investigation of the pellets of the Common Heron (Ardea cinerea cinerea). Ibis, 82: 433–450.
- Hibbert-Ware, A., & Ruttledge, R.F. (1944). A study of the inland food habits of the Common Curlew. British Birds, 38: 22–27.

== See also ==
- Gulielma Lister
- British Trust for Ornithology
