= Arenga listeri =

Conservation status
- Vulnerable (IUCN 2.3)

Scientific classification
- Kingdom: Plantae
- Clade: Tracheophytes
- Clade: Angiosperms
- Clade: Monocots
- Clade: Commelinids
- Order: Arecales
- Family: Arecaceae
- Genus: Arenga
- Species: A. listeri

Binomial name
- Arenga listeri Becc.

Species of palm

Arenga listeri, the Lister's palm, is a species of flowering plant in the family Arecaceae. It is named after naturalist Joseph Jackson Lister.

It is endemic to Christmas Island and is threatened by habitat loss.

The palm has been featured on postage stamps in Australia.
