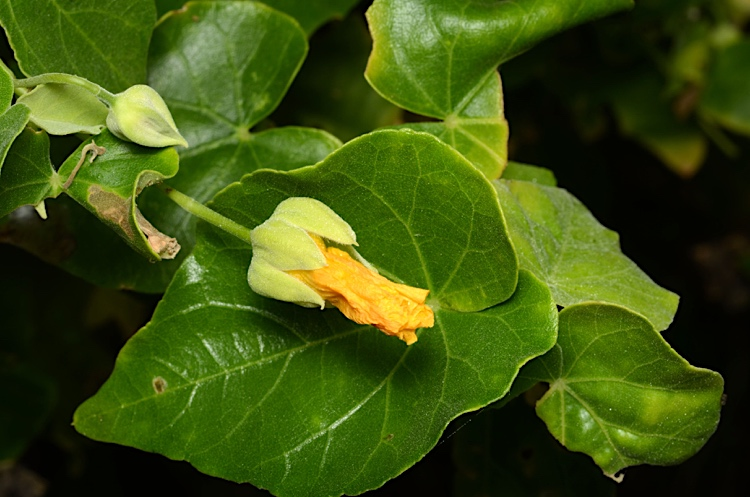

Scientific classification
- Kingdom: Plantae
- Clade: Tracheophytes
- Clade: Angiosperms
- Clade: Eudicots
- Clade: Rosids
- Order: Malvales
- Family: Malvaceae
- Genus: Abutilon
- Species: A. listeri

Binomial name
- Abutilon listeri Baker f., 1893

= Abutilon listeri =

Species of flowering plant

Abutilon listeri, commonly known as the lantern flower, is a tropical shrub in the Malvaceae or mallow family. It is endemic to Christmas Island, an Australian territory in the north-eastern Indian Ocean. Its specific epithet honours British zoologist and plant collector Joseph Jackson Lister, who visited the island on HMS Egeria in 1887.

== Description ==
Abutilon listeri is a common shrub on Christmas Island, growing to 1–3 m in height. The leaves are circular to broadly ovate, either entire or weakly crenate, and about 90–160 mm long. The yellow flowers occur in loose, terminal panicles.

== Distribution and habitat ==
Found only on Christmas Island, the lantern flower grows in natural clearings and the rainforest margin behind the sea cliffs on the lower terraces, and is often found in secondary growth and along paths and tracks. It responds well to environmental disturbance.

== Taxonomy ==
The lantern flower is closely related to the sympatric A. auritum; both have a paniculate inflorescence and fewer than 15 mericarps.
