= Hugh Lister =

Hugh Evelyn Jackson Lister MC (15 May 1901 – 9 September 1944) was an English Anglican priest, trade union organizer, and combatant British Army officer in the Second World War.

Graduate of Cambridge University and Cuddesdon Theological College, he was an Anglo-Catholic and friend of Austin Farrer. Leader of Hackney branch of Transport and General Workers Union. Organized labour and led strikes in East End of London in the late 1930s.

Lister volunteered to serve in the Second World War with the Welsh Guards and, as a major, commanded a support company. Lister was killed by German fire at Hechtel, Belgium, on 9 September 1944.

== Bibliography ==
- Cameron, Alice. In Pursuit of Justice: The Story of Hugh Lister and His Friends in Hackney Wick. London: SCM Press, 1946.
- Hein, David. "Hugh Lister (1901–44): A Modern Saint?" Theology 103 (2000): 339–46.
- Hein, David. "Hugh Lister (1901–44): Priest, Labor Leader, Combatant Officer." Anglican and Episcopal History 70 (2001): 353–74.
- Hein, David. "Farrer on Friendship, Sainthood, and the Will of God." In Captured by the Crucified: The Practical Theology of Austin Farrer, ed. David Hein and Edward Hugh Henderson, 119–148. New York and London: T & T Clark, 2004. See pp. 120–128: i.e., the section entitled "Exemplar: Hugh Lister."
- Hein, David. "Saints: Holy, Not Tame." Sewanee Theological Review 49 (2006): 204–17.
- Hein, David. "Christianity and Honor." The Living Church, 18 August 2013, pp. 8–10. http://livingchurch.org/christianity-and-honor
- Niebuhr, Reinhold, and Ursula Niebuhr. Remembering Reinhold Niebuhr: letters of Reinhold and Ursula M. Niebuhr. HarperSanFrancisco, 1991. Includes mention of Lister's visit to America.
- Snape, Michael. God and the British Soldier: Religion and the British Army in the First and Second World Wars. London and New York: Routledge, 2005. See chap. 4: "The Church in Khaki."
