= Eswyn Lyster =

Canadian writer (1923–2009)

Coral Eswyn Lyster
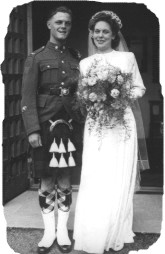
- Eswyn Lyster's wedding 1943 to CSM Wm. L. Lyster
- Born: Coral Eswyn Ellinor; September 27, 1923; London, England, United Kingdom
- Died: July 18, 2009 (aged 85); Victoria, British Columbia, Canada
- Occupation: Author
- Writing career
- Pen name: Eswyn Ellinor-Lyster, Eswyn Lyster
- Period: 1950–2009
- Subject: war bride history
- Notable works: Most Excellent Citizens, Lyster Pioneers, A Bloody Miracle
- Website: members.shaw.ca/francislyster/warbride/

Coral Eswyn (née Ellinor) Lyster, (September 27, 1923 – July 18, 2009) was a British-born Canadian author best known for writing extensively on the Canadian war bride experience. She also published articles on the Dieppe Raid in World War II, as well as a book on genealogy.

== Biography ==
Eswyn Ellinor was born in London, England, to Stanley Ellinor (a newsagent) and Coral Winifred (née Stuart) Ellinor. During World War II, she served in the Women's Royal Naval Service (WRNS), informally known as the Wrens, which was the women's branch of the Royal Navy.

In 1943, she met Company Sergeant Major (CSM) Bill Lyster of the Calgary Highlanders, a Canadian regiment stationed in her home town of Aldwick, Sussex. They were married later in the year. In April 1945, Bill, now commissioned and with the rank of captain, was badly wounded and repatriated to Canada. In February 1946, Eswyn and her infant son joined the stream of 44,000 war brides travelling to Canada.

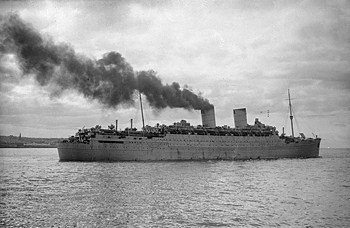
RMS Mauretania (1938)

Many ships, like the Queen Mary, were pressed into service for this massive emigration: Eswyn crossed the Atlantic Ocean on the RMS Mauretania, the first dedicated war bride crossing, to Pier 21 in Halifax, Nova Scotia. Bill was from Empress, Alberta, and she and her son traveled by train from Halifax to join his family there.

Following emigration, her family lived in Regina and Edmonton when her daughter and younger son were born. In the 1950s, Eswyn began writing about her experiences and family. From 1956 to 1969, she lived in North Vancouver, British Columbia. In 1969, she and her husband retired to Qualicum Beach on Vancouver Island where she maintained an active writing career.

She was a long-time member of the Anglican Church of Canada, an avid alpine gardener, and a member of several gardening clubs. She died in Victoria General Hospital July 18, 2009.

== Bibliography and writing associations ==
Eswyn wrote Most Excellent Citizens, A History of the Canadian War Brides of World War II (title taken from a comment by the war historian C.P. Stacey). It was published posthumously in May 2010 by Trafford Press.

Under the name Eswyn Ellinor-Lyster, she wrote Lyster Pioneers of Lower Canada and the West: The story of the Lysters of the old Queen's County, Ireland, who settled in Canada early in the nineteenth century.

Her article "A Bloody Miracle", an account of the Calgary Highlanders' Mortar Platoon's experience on the Dieppe Raid, was chosen as the lead story by Legion Magazine to mark the fortieth anniversary of that unhappy event. It has been frequently reprinted, notably in the book, True Canadian War Stories, from the pages of the Legion Magazine.

In the same book is "Ten Days and Seven Thousand Miles", her account of her journey to Canada on the first all-warbride sailing of the RMS Mauretania (1938) in February 1946.

She was a member of the Federation of BC Writers, as well as a long-time member of Spindrift Writers of Parksville and Qualicum Beach.

== Notable events and webpage ==
- Royal BC Museum – A portrait of her wedding day was featured in the Royal British Columbia Museum exhibit called War Brides: One-Way Passage, in Victoria, British Columbia. Running from May until September 2008, it was a collection of 81 paintings by Calgary artist Bev Tosh, who is herself the daughter of a war bride. Eswyn was a featured guest at its opening on May 10–11, 2008 (Mother's Day).
- Canadian Citizenship issues – Eswyn also became an advocate for those caught in the Lost Canadian debate, giving testimony at a Canadian Parliamentary committee hearing on citizenship. She has collaborated with historian and researcher Melynda Jarratt on war bride and Canadian citizenship issues.
- War bride anniversaries – Eswyn was a speaker at "The Year of the War Bride" event, held at and sponsored by Pier 21, February 5, 2006. (The then-Lieutenant-Governor of Nova Scotia Her Honour The Honourable Myra Freeman was the keynote speaker.)
- Webpage – Her webpage includes an interactive message board for those seeking information about war brides – either for themselves or for relatives. Eswyn was also compiling an extensive war bride database of those in contact with her.

== See also ==
- Lyster
- War bride
- Pier 21
- Royal British Columbia Museum
- RMS Mauretania (1938)
- List of Canadian writers
