= Charles J. Lister =

Charles J. Lister (1820, in London – 1912, in Owen Sound, Ontario) was a central figure in the Restoration Movement in 19th century Canada.

He immigrated to Bowmanville U.C. in 1821, In the late 1840s he turned down a handsome position with the Bank of Montreal for a life of service in the ministry with the Disciples of Christ. The Disciples can be traced to the evangelical influences of the 19th century brothers James and Robert Haldane, Greville Ewing, and 18th century John Glas and Robert Sandeman, all of Scotland. 'C. J.' was known as the "Ubiquitous Lister" owing to his widespread and lengthy evangelical work in Ontario and Manitoba.

In 1855 Lister accompanied Alexander Campbell, the Irish born cofounder of the American Disciples of Christ on his sole visit to Upper Canada. Campbell himself had been favorably impressed in 1808/09 with Greville Ewing in Glasgow. In the 1860s Lister edited his own journal The Advisor. A son, John B. Lister continued in missionary work in Oregon and was editor there of the Church and School Reporter.

Charles was married to Abigail Burke, daughter of UEL John Burke of Darlington, Ontario. Interestingly, the Burke family cemetery sits by the Darlington nuclear power plant. Granddaughters Mary Miller and Olive Knowles were longstanding teachers in Owen sound and actively involved with the Disciples Church. A grandson F. G. Miller was integral in the early Disciples in Vermilion Alberta. A descendent J Bruce Burke Miller wrote Opening Destiny: Atlantis to Armageddon (1999). The book dealt with faith, compassion and mathematical support of prophesies. These included the Biblical Book of Daniel and Revelations concerning advent of Christ and end times. It’s of interest too that Sir Isaac Newton, among others, also studied Biblical prophecy.

== Sources ==
- Reuben Butchart, The Disciples of Christ in Canada Since 1830, Canadian Headquarters' Publications, Churches of Christ (Disciples), Toronto, 1949. Entry on Charles J. Lister. pp. 141–142.
