= Joseph Lister (VC) =

English Victoria Cross recipient (1886-1963)

- Born: 19 October 1886; Salford, Lancashire, England
- Died: 19 January 1963 (aged 76); Reddish, Stockport, England
- Burial place: Willow Grove Cemetery, Reddish, Stockport, England
- Military career
- Allegiance: United Kingdom
- Branch: British Army
- Rank: Sergeant
- Service number: 8133
- Units: Lancashire Fusiliers
- Conflicts: World War I
- Awards: Victoria Cross

Sergeant Joseph Lister VC (19 October 1886 − 19 January 1963) was a British Army soldier and an English recipient of the Victoria Cross (VC), the highest and most prestigious award for gallantry in the face of the enemy that can be awarded to British and Commonwealth forces.

Lister was 30 years old, and a sergeant in the 1st Battalion, The Lancashire Fusiliers, British Army during World War I when he received the Victoria Cross for his actions at the battle of Passchendaele, Belgium on 9 October 1917. Lister was a native of Stockport, and served in the 1st Battalion of the Lancashire Fusiliers. He earned his medal for storming two machine gun posts and capturing 100 enemy troops.

On 9 October 1917 east of Ypres, Belgium, seeing that the advance of his company was held up by machine-gun fire from the direction of a pillbox, Sergeant Lister dashed ahead of his men and found the gun - he shot two of the gunners and the remainder surrendered. He then went to the pillbox and shouted to the occupants to surrender. They did so with the exception of one man whom the sergeant shot, whereupon about 100 of the enemy emerged from the shell-holes further to the rear and surrendered.

Sergeant Lister survived the war and died in 1963. He is buried in Willow Grove Cemetery, Reddish. His VC is on display in the Lord Ashcroft Gallery at the Imperial War Museum, London.

100 years after his actions, Salford City Council unveiled a commemorative paving stone, outside Broughton Hub, in his honour.
