= Joseph Jackson Lister (naturalist) =

British zoologist (1857–1927)

Joseph Jackson Lister FRS (August 3, 1857 – February 5, 1927) was a British zoologist and plant collector from Leytonstone who collected biological specimens during travels in Africa, Asia, Australasia and the Pacific region.

== Life ==
Lister's grandfather was also named Joseph Jackson Lister, and was a pioneer of high quality optical microscopes. Lister's uncle was Joseph Lister, 1st Baron Lister, the pioneer of antiseptic surgery. Lister attended St John's College, Cambridge where he was appointed Demonstrator in Animal Morphology in 1881, and Senior Lecturer in Animal Morphology in 1892. During 1887-1888 he also served as volunteer naturalist on the surveying voyage of HMS Egeria to Christmas Island in the Indian Ocean, where he made valuable collections.

He is commemorated in the specific epithet of an orchid (Phreatia listeri ), Lister's palm (Arenga listeri ), the Christmas Island lantern flower (Abutilon listeri ), and Lister's gecko (Lepidodactylus listeri ).

He is also featured on a 1978 postage stamp of Christmas Island together with Lister's Palm.

He was elected a Fellow of the Royal Society in 1900. His application stated:

"Demonstrator of Comparative Anatomy in the University of Cambridge. Distinguished as a Zoologist. Was Naturalist on board HMS Egeria in two cruises, one to Christmas Island (Indian Ocean), the fauna of which he was the first to investigate, and another in the Pacific amongst the Tonga, Union, and Phoenix Islands, during which he made himself well acquainted with the fauna of those islands, and of the Seychelles. His researches on the Foraminifera have thrown important light on the life-history and reproduction of that group. Author of the following papers: - 'On the Natural History of Christmas Island in the Indian Ocean' (Proc Zool Soc, 1888, p 512); 'On some Points in the Natural History of Fungia' (Quart Journ Micros Soc, Vol xxix, p 359); 'A Visit to the Newly-Emerged Falcon Island, Tonga Group, S Pacific' (Proc Roy Geograph Soc, March, 1890); 'Notes on the Birds of the Phoenix Islands, Pacific Ocean' (Proc Zool Soc, 1891, p 289); 'Notes on the Natives of Fakaofu (Bowditch Island), Union Group' (Journ Anthrop Inst, 1891, p 43); 'Notes on the Geology of the Tonga Island' (Quart Journ Geol Soc, vol xlvii, p 590); 'Contributions to the Life-History of the Foraminifera' (Abstract, (Proc Roy Soc, vol lvi, p 155. Full paper, Phil Trans, vol clxxxvi, 1895B, p 401); 'A Possible Explanation of the Quinqueloculine Arrangement of the Chambers in the Young of the Microspheric Forms of Triloculina and Biloculina' (Proc Camb Phil Soc, vol ix, pt v); with J J Fletcher, 'On the Condition of the Median Portion of the Vaginal Apparatus in the 'Macropodidae (Proc Zool Soc, vol lxiii, 1881, p 976). "
