= Joseph Jackson Lister =

British physicist

- Lister before 1869
- Born: 11 January 1786; City of London, England
- Died: 24 October 1869 (aged 83); Upton, Essex, London
- Known for: Development of the optical microscope
- Scientific career
- Fields: Opticist and physicist

Joseph Jackson Lister FRS FRMS (11 January 1786 – 24 October 1869) was an English opticist and physicist best known for being the father of Joseph Lister, 1st Baron Lister.

== Life ==
In 1705, Thomas Lister, a farmer and maltster, of Bingley, Yorkshire, England, married Hannah, daughter of a yeoman (an independent small farmer). They joined the Society of Friends, becoming Quakers, as were most of their descendants. They had a son, Joseph, who left Yorkshire in about 1720 to become a tobacconist in Aldersgate Street in the City of London.

Joseph's youngest son, christened John, was born in 1737. He was apprenticed to a watchmaker, Isaac Rogers, in 1752, and followed that trade on his own account in Bell Alley, Lombard Street from 1759 to 1766. He then took over his father's tobacco business, but gave it up in 1769 in favour of his father-in-law Stephen Jackson's business as a wine-merchant in Lothbury.

John Lister was made a freeman of the Bakers' company in 1760. He married Mary in 1764, and had daughters within three years; after an interval of nineteen years, in 1786, when he was 49, his wife gave birth to their only son, Joseph Jackson Lister.

== Adulthood ==
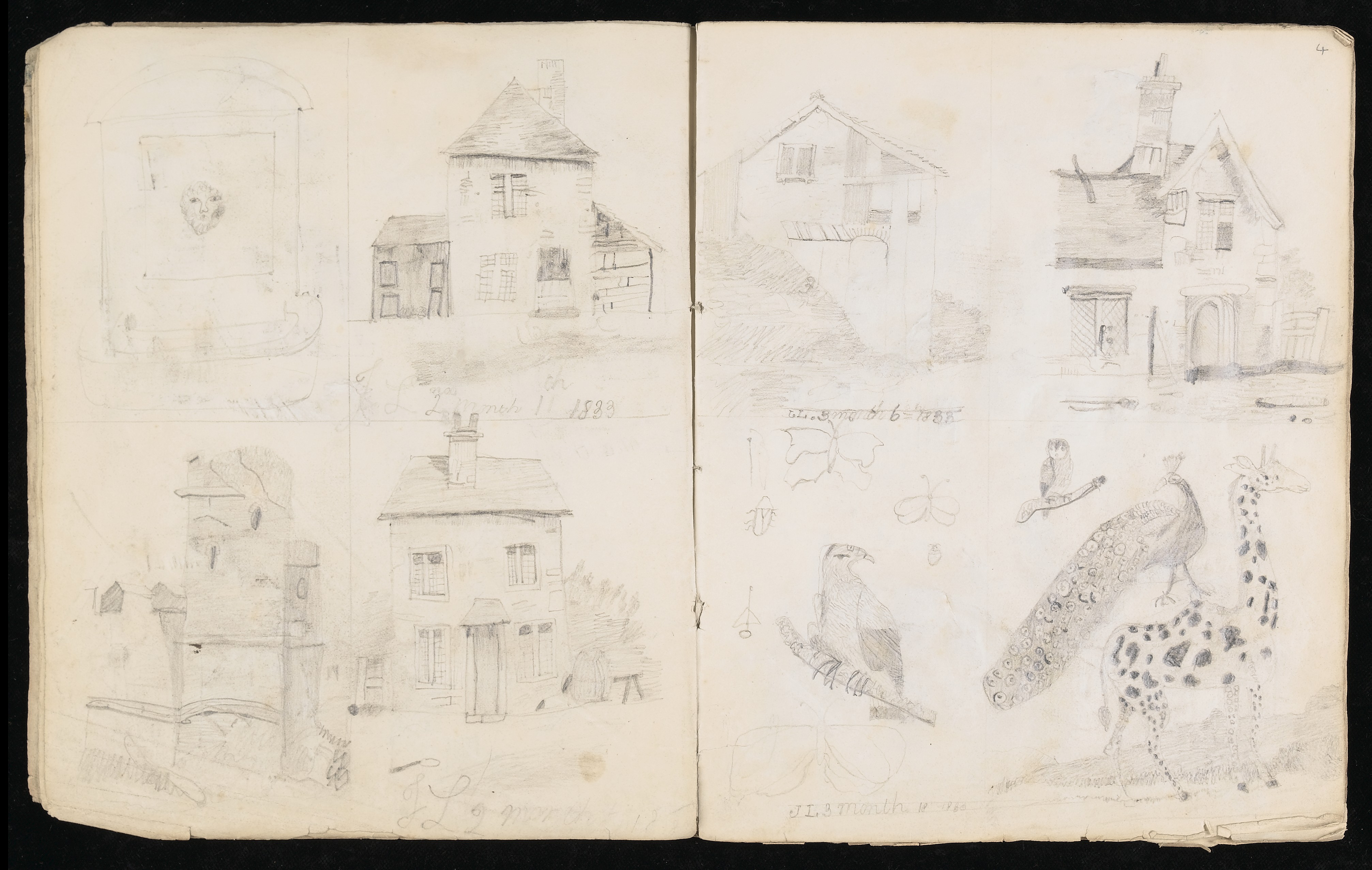
Lister's sketchbook

On leaving school in 1800, Joseph Jackson was apprenticed to his father's wine business in Lothbury, which was becoming a thriving and prosperous concern, and in 1804, at the age of 18 he was made a partner.

During a visit to the Quaker Ackworth School near Pontefract in 1814, he met Isabella Harris, then aged 22, the daughter of the school superintendent, also called Isabella, a widow with six children. Isabella junior taught reading and writing to the girls of the school for five years, leaving in 1818 to marry Joseph Jackson Lister. She was then 26, and he was 32. After their marriage, they lived for three years at Tokenhouse Yard, where his wine business was carried on, then for four years at Stoke Newington. In 1821 Lister invested in a trading ship commanded by his brother-in-law.

They then bought Upton House in 1825, a spacious old Queen Anne style residence with fields and gardens at Upton in Essex.

Upton was then a country hamlet to the east of London, close to Hainault and Epping Forest, and the Barking marshes, and it was a pleasant country walk along the banks of the Thames into London. Their neighbours were Samuel Gurney, a Lombard Street banker, and his family who lived in Ham House. It was Gurney who had advised Lister to buy Upton House, and the Lister family lived in close contact with the young people growing up at Ham House.

== Family ==
Their children included Mary, 1820–94, who married Rickman Godlee, a barrister of the Inner Temple in 1845, John, 1822–46, Isabella Sophia, 1823–70, Joseph, 1827–1912, William Henry, 1828–59 and Arthur Hugh, 1830–1908. Joseph studied medicine, becoming a surgeon and achieving fame and a baronetcy – and later a peerage, becoming Lord Lister – for his work in antisepsis. He operated on his sister Isabella in 1867, performing radical surgery to remove an advanced cancerous breast tumour. She lived for three years after the operation. (Rickman John Godlee, surgeon, a grandson of J. J. Lister, later wrote a biography of his uncle Joseph.) Joseph's guidance of his son, Joseph, was a large factor in his son's outstanding success. Joseph Lister died in 1912 from a brain tumour at the age of 84. A grandson of Joseph Jackson Lister was also called Joseph Jackson Lister and was a naturalist and taxonomist.

== Microscopy ==
J. J. Lister was deeply interested in natural history, and realized that the microscopes available in the early 19th century did not provide adequate resolution to reveal the structure of plant cells and animal cells in sufficient detail. He therefore set out to improve the design of the objective lens, improving upon the achromatic lens first designed by Chester Moore Hall and John Dolland in the 18th century, and altering the spacing of the lens elements such that the resulting compound lens not only provided better correction for chromatic aberration, but minimized spherical aberration as well. He performed this work in his spare time, while fully engaged in his wine business. He began this work in 1824, and by 1826 he had commissioned an improved microscope stand to be made by the instrument-making firm of William Tulley.

The stand was made by an employee of Tulley, James Smith, and is preserved in the Wellcome Institute. Smith set up on his own in 1837, later taking on Richard Beck, a nephew of Lister, as an apprentice finally becoming a partner in 1847 when the company was renamed Smith & Beck. Lister published his work in 1830 in a paper entitled "On Some Properties in Achromatic Object-Glasses Applicable to the Improvement of the Microscope" submitted to the Royal Society, and collaborated with Smith and with Andrew Ross, who had established what was to become one of the finest microscope manufacturers in 1832. Lister's law of aplanatic foci remained the underlying principle of microscopic science.

He had a large circle of scientific contacts, including Airy, Herschel and fellow Quaker Dr Thomas Hodgkin, with whom he discussed microscopic observations including those of red blood cells, leading to the identification of 'Hodgkin's disease’. He was elected a Fellow of the Royal Society in 1832. His interest continued, writing a paper in 1843, entitled 'On the Limit to Defining Power in Vision with the Unassisted Eye, the Telescope and the Microscope’. It was never published, but years later it was presented by his son Lord Lister to the Royal Microscopical Society, and seen to have anticipated many of the later discoveries made by Ernst Abbe and others.

== Old age ==
Lister was deeply affected by the premature death of his son John in 1846, and thereafter appeared to have given up his optical investigations. Their youngest, and for a long while only daughter left at home had married in 1858, and for six years Joseph and Isabella had lived alone at Upton. Their son William Henry died in 1859 after a long illness on a ship bound for Australia. His wife Isabella, who had long been in poor health, died in September 1864, aged 72. Joseph's remaining five years were lonely, although three of the children lived nearby with many grandchildren, and he observed that "since his own great loss his friends and contemporaries seemed falling like autumn leaves". His chief pleasure during his final years was to receive weekly letters from Joseph in Edinburgh, and to watch his son's advance and the progress of his discoveries.

He died aged 83 in October 1869 at home at Upton House, and was buried along with Isabella his wife, in the Friends' Burial Ground, Stoke Newington, Middlesex.

== Bibliography ==
- Lister, Joseph Jackson; Hodgkin, T. (1827). "Notice of Some Microscopic Observations of the Blood and Animal Tissues". Philosophical Magazine. 2: 130–138.
- Lister, Joseph Jackson (1830). "On the Improvement of Achromatic Compound Microscopes". Philosophical Transactions of the Royal Society. 120: 187–200.
- Lister, Joseph Jackson (1834). "Some Observations on the Structure and Functions of Tubular and Cellular Polypi, and of Ascidiae". Philosophical Transactions of the Royal Society. 124: 365–388.
- Lister, Joseph Jackson (1913). "On the Limit to Defining-power, in Vision With the Unassisted Eye, the Telescope, and the Microscope". Journal of the Royal Microscopical Society. 33: 34–35.
