= List of DX-peditions =

DX-peditions are planned events for amateur radio operators who travel to remote, rare, or difficult-to-access locations, primarily for making as many contacts as possible with radio enthusiasts around the world. These expeditions are a significant aspect of the amateur radio hobby and are particularly exciting for those looking to make contacts with locations that are difficult to access.

Notable DX-peditions
Year	Location (Note: Some locations are subject to territorial disputes as such the flags represent the nation that issued the amateur radio license.)	Call sign	Information	References
2026	Bouvet Island	3Y0K	second most wanted DXCC location	
2023	Swains Island	W8S	28th most wanted DXCC location	
2023	Sable Island	CY0S	49th most wanted DXCC location	
2023	Bouvet Island	3Y0J	second most wanted DXCC location	
2020	South Orkney Islands	VP8PJ	47th most wanted DXCC location	
2018	Baker Island	KH1/KH7Z	protected US Island in the South Pacific, 31st most wanted DXCC location	
2016	Heard Island	VK0EK		
2015	Navassa Island	K1N	At the time this location was the #1 most-wanted DXCC entity on ClubLog and the DX Magazine survey	
2014	Amsterdam Island	FT5ZM		
2013	Clipperton Island	TX5K	Made more than 113,000 contacts including 47 EME contacts.	
2012	Campbell Island	ZL9HR		
2007	Scarborough Shoal	BS7H	located on a rock less than six feet above sea level, 5th most wanted DXCC location	
1978	Clipperton Island	FO0XB	First DXpedition to the island in 20 years, 38th most wanted DXCC location	
1974	Palmyra Atoll	KP6PA	operators were featured in the book And the Sea Will Tell about the Sea Wind murder, 20th most wanted DXCC location	
