= Hungarian World Bus & DX-Pedition =

Hungarian World Bus & DX-Pedition; Globexpedition
- Sponsor: Globex Foundation; MOGÜRT
- Start: Budapest, Hungary; 23 October 1991
- End: Budapest, Hungary; 27 June 1993
- Goal: traveling 72000 kilometers around the Earth, across more than 30 countries, in two years; making 100000 QSOs during the journey
- Crew: Gábor "Gabi" Kovács (HG5BKG); István "Pista" Himberger (HG5CHI); Imre "Imi" Páskuly (HA5HO)

The Hungarian World Bus & DX-Pedition or Globexpedition (in Hungarian: Globexpedíció), also known by the radio call sign HA5BUS and its variations, was a DX-pedition with the aim of traveling around the globe with a bus. The expedition lasted 614 days from 23 October 1991 to 27 June 1993, and its team traveled through or visited places in Hungary, the Soviet Union (which was in the process of dissolution at the time), Turkey, Iran, Pakistan, India, Bangladesh, Bhutan, Singapore, Australia, the United States, Canada, Germany and Austria. The participants were three Hungarian men, all licensed amateur radio (or "ham") operators; bus driver Gábor Kovács (nicknamed "Gabi", call sign: HG5BKG), Volánbusz mechanical engineer István Himberger ("Pista", HG5CHI) and Rádiózás magazine's then chief editor Imre Páskuly ("Imi", HA5HO).

The team used a 12 m (39 ft) long, custom-built Ikarus 350 coach manufactured by the Hungarian company Ikarus, which was outfitted with various radio equipment and comfort-enhancing amenities. Among others, the expedition was supported by the Budapest-based Globex Foundation and MOGÜRT, Hungary's automotive foreign trade company.

== Idea and preparations ==
Bus driver Gábor Kovács was driving on a long-distance private charter route between Budapest, capital of Hungary and Istanbul, Turkey in the spring of 1988, and during this trip he was reminded of the successful circumnavigation of the Earth achieved in the previous year by his fellow countrymen Nándor Fa and József Gál, and their sailboat St. Jupat. This gave him the inspiration to embark on a similar journey across the globe, but done by using a bus. By the time he arrived back in Budapest, he already had a notebook filled up with sketches, calculations and itineraries. In the following months, Kovács spent his time organizing a journey, soliciting sponsors and developing a detailed itinerary. He was joined in his endeavor by his childhood friend István Himberger, who was a mechanical engineer at Volánbusz, and Imre Páskuly, who was then chief editor of the Rádiózás amateur radio magazine. In a publicity stunt to gather sponsors, Kovács set the Guinness world record for endurance bus driving when he drove an Ikarus 256 coach on the Hungaroring race track non-stop for 30 and half hours on 5–6 November 1988.

By the end of 1988, all of the planning work was done and the team already gathered some sponsors, but they still lacked a vehicle. As they were determined to use a Hungarian Ikarus bus, they contacted the company's trade representative at the beginning of 1989, receiving positive feedback, and for a while, it seemed like the Ikarus Székesfehérvár factory would provide the expedition with an Ikarus 250. However, at the time, the People's Republic of Hungary was in the process of transitioning from being a communist state to being a democratic state, and this caused established deals that the team have made to fall through, making the expedition's future uncertain.

Later, the team was in talks with the Ikarus Mátyásföld factory, but it turned out the company was no longer able to provide a complete vehicle for the expedition. They decided to contact individual members in the automotive supply chain to gather the required parts for a bus, and after each of the companies they asked offered parts for the endeavor, Ikarus pledged to produce the vehicle body and assemble a vehicle using these parts if the team paid for the associated labor costs. As this was still a significant sum of money for them, with the help of Ikarus, the team secured a subsidy from the Hungarian Ministry of Industry (IpM), and thus the manufacturing of the bus could have started.

The vehicle, having a white factory paint job and still being unfurnished, was completed by early March 1990, receiving the 350.02 model designation (type 350, variant 02) and chassis number 004. The team took the bus on its first serious test drive when they drove it to the 1990 Ham Radio convention in Friedrichshafen, Germany, to gather more sponsors and to buy radio equipment. During this trip, the stock, 250 hp Rába D2156 MT6U engine was deemed to be underpowered for such an expedition, so after returning, they started to seek out a stronger replacement. Rába itself couldn't offer them any alternatives, as their D10 product family was still under development at the time. The team contacted multiple larger engine manufacturers in Europe, but none of them could offer an engine for the bus. In the meantime, the team members continued to work on the vehicle's interior at the Ikarus workshop, often working on weekends and holidays, sometimes even sleeping in the bus after they were locked in the workshop.

The issue of engine replacement was later solved with the help of József, an older Ikarus mechanic from the company's experimental and prototyping "EAG" department (Egyedi Autóbusz Gyáregység, "Custom-made Bus Division"), who have shown the team two mothballed Cummins LTA10-B 290H engines. These were intended to be used as part of articulated Ikarus 280.60 buses destined for export to Ecuador in 1988, but they were damaged after cargo mishandling, and thus weren't put to use. Ikarus offered one of the engines to the team, but couldn't guarantee providing the required engineering documentation to mount it in the vehicle in a timely manner. At the suggestion of the mechanic, they petitioned Ikarus leadership to allow EAG to mount the engine on an ad-hoc basis, which was greenlighted, although with Ikarus not providing any warranty for the work. Thus the engine was mounted in March 1991, and later in May it was tested at the European center of Cummins in Frankfurt, where it was granted a worldwide warranty by the company. The work required the team to buy replacement parts abroad to fix the external damage to the engine, as well as using additional parts produced by the Csepel Automobile Factory so that the unit, originally designed to be mounted upright as a vertical engine, could have been mounted underfloor as a horizontal engine, a practice which was standard at Ikarus.

The team took the bus on a second, extended test drive in the form of a trip to Albania in the summer of 1991, using the call sign ZA1HA. The country was chosen because of the similarities between its environments and those of Eastern countries and the trip was considered a success. After this, the interior was furnished with the help of the Lenti Wood and Metal Industry Cooperative of Lenti. Later that year, the design of the interior won an award at the 1991 Fall Budapest International Fair (BNV).

In the days preceding their departure for the expedition, they received pots and other kitchen items from Vasedény, cameras from Ofotért, and film rolls from Forte Photochemistry Industrial as part of sponsorship.

The goal (as stated on their QSL cards) was set to "travel 72000 kilometres round the Globe by a Hungarian bus in two years" and to "make 100000 QSOs [radio contacts] during the journey across more than 30 countries of five continents". The expedition's motto became "Around the World in a Bus".

== Crew ==
The expedition's members were three licensed amateur radio operators from Hungary:

- Gábor Kovács (nicknamed "Gabi", call sign: HG5BKG):
  Kovács was the organizer, spokesman, team leader, navigator and first driver of the expedition. He was a bus driver, driving instructor, rally driver and Guinness world record holder for endurance bus driving, which was set on the Hungaroring race track in November 1988. Kovács was 36–37 years old at the time of the expedition's start, and as of the beginning of 1990, he had two daughters.
- István Himberger ("Pista", HG5CHI):
  Himberger was the engineer, technician and second driver of the expedition. He was a childhood friend of Kovács, and a Volánbusz mechanical engineer. Himberger was 36–37 years old at the time of the expedition's start, and as of the beginning of 1990, he was a father of three girls.
- Imre Páskuly ("Imi", HA5HO):
  Páskuly was the main radio operator, license and QSL manager, cook, chronicler and cameraman of the expedition. He was the chief editor of the amateur radio and CB magazine Rádiózás and the editor of the Rádióamatőr QTC program at the time. Páskuly was aged 45–46 at the time of the expedition's start, and as of the beginning of 1990, he had one daughter.

Among the three men, Páskuly was the only HF operator, as Kovács and Himberger had a VHF license.

== Vehicle and equipment ==
=== Globex Ikarus 350 and its amenities ===
Globex Ikarus 350.02
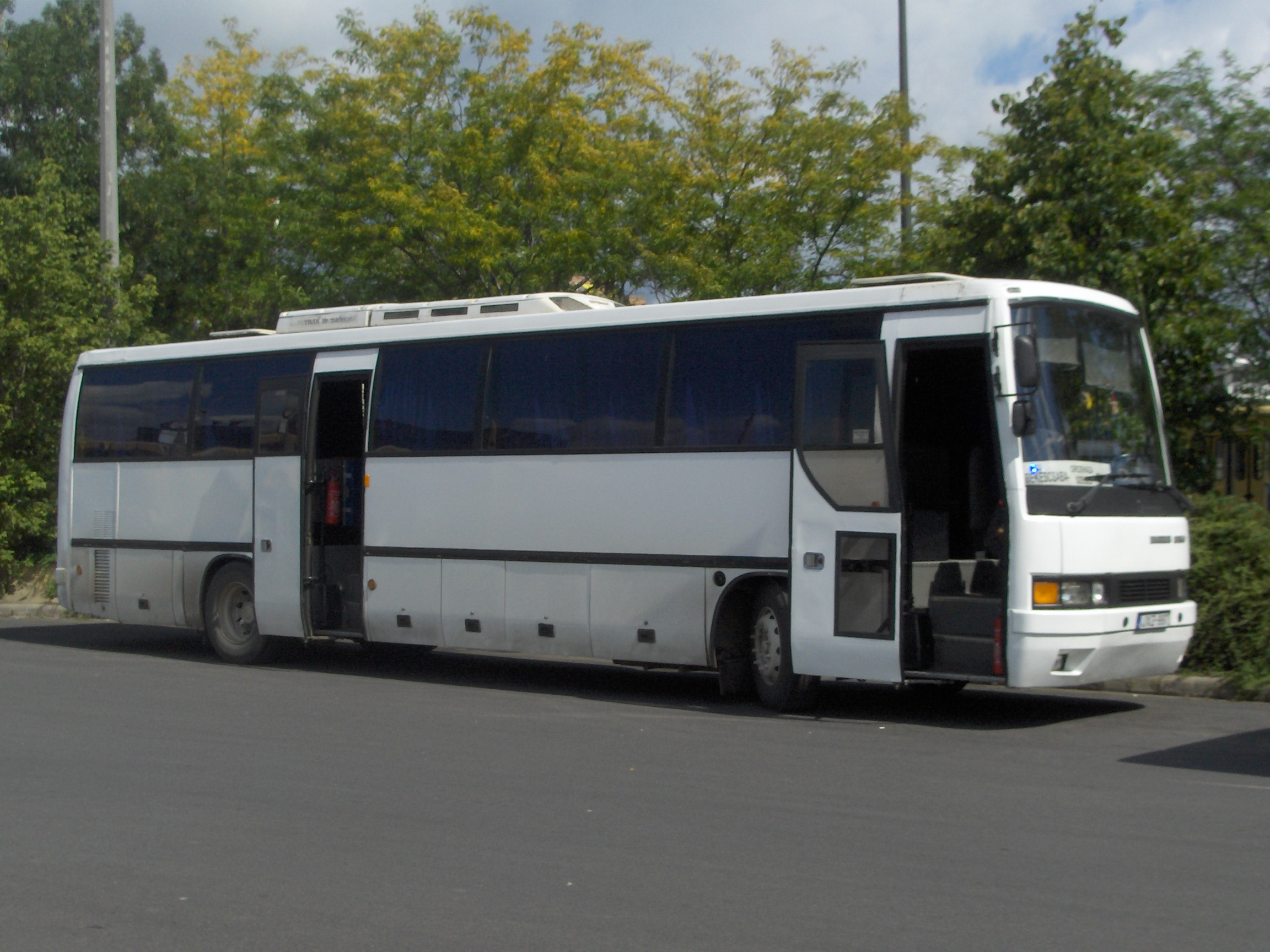
- A stock Ikarus 350 coach similar to the custom bus used by the expedition

Overview
- Manufacturer: Ikarus
- Also called: HA5BUS (radio call sign); BRZ-685 (vehicle registration code)
- Production: 1989? – March 1990
- Assembly: Hungary: Budapest (Ikarus Mátyásföld factory)

Body and chassis
- Class: coach
- Body style: rigid body, high-floor
- Layout: rear-engine, rear-wheel-drive
- Related: Ikarus 350

Powertrain
- Engine: initially: 10.3 L Rába D2156 MT6U I6-T (diesel); subsequently: 10.0 L Cummins LTA10-B 290H I6-T (diesel)
- Transmission: 6-speed Csepel S6-120U manual

Dimensions
- Length: 12 m (39 ft)

The team acquired a 12 m (39 ft) long, custom-built Ikarus coach, which was largely identical to the stock Ikarus 350.02 model variant. The vehicle was produced by the Mátyásföld factory of Ikarus, using parts that were offered by various companies in the automotive industry which wanted to sponsor the expedition.

These automotive companies included:

- Rába (Rába D2156 MT6U 10.3 L turbocharged I6 diesel engine with 250 hp, a MAN license; Rába MVG 832 front and Rába MVG 007 rear beam axles)
- Ikarus (Cummins LTA10-B 290H 10.0 L turbocharged I6 diesel engine, custom-made grille guard)
- Gear Csepel Automobile Transmission Factory (Csepel S6-120U 6-speed manual transmission, a ZF license)
- Voith (retarder)
- Elbe (drive shaft)
- Fichtel & Sachs (shock absorbers)
- Knorr-Bremse (brake and pneumatic systems)
- WABCO (electric leveling system)
- Taurus Rubber Industry Company (tires)
- Transportation Measuring Instruments Factory (KMGY; electric instruments and sensors)
- Salgoglas (window panes)
- Sütrak (HVAC systems)

The fuel capacity was 870 L (230 US gal) with multiple tanks. Initially the team planned to use regular pneumatic tires from Taurus with Trilex modular rims to facilitate easy field repairs, but they ended up using more modern tubeless tires from the company. During a test drive before the expedition, the vehicle was able to reach a speed of 140 km/h (87 mph).

The interior included a "navigator seat", a fully equipped kitchen (including a two-burner stove fed by gas cylinders, a Lehel refrigerator, a combination microwave oven and "bread-making facilities"), a couch with a dining table, a bathroom with shower, a toilet, a radio booth, a storage closet at the back of the vehicle, and three sleeping berths for the crew. The bus also had comfort-enhancing amenities such as an air conditioning system designed for tropical weather, a Hajdu Minimat washing machine, a 3.6 kW Honda engine-generator, a 400 L (110 US gal) hot water and a 200 L (53 US gal) cold water tank. Overall the living space was roughly 20 m^{2} (220 sq ft). The team has paid special attention to balancing the equipment, and later measurements confirmed that the weight imbalance between the left and right side of the vehicle was less than 90 kg (200 lb).

The exterior included extra auxiliary lights, a custom-made grille guard provided by Ikarus, a roof carrier, and various antennas. The bus was assigned the vehicle registration code BRZ-685.

=== Radio equipment ===
The vehicle was equipped with various high frequency (HF), very high frequency (VHF) and ultra high frequency (UHF) radio and antenna systems. The equipment included Icom and Yaesu devices (such as a Yaesu FT-990 high frequency transceiver), a Drake L-4B linear amplifier, as well as two personal computers. For antennas, the Ikarus had a 9 m (30 ft) high, extendable antenna mast, a Hy-Gain 18AVT/WB omnidirectional vertical antenna, a three-element, 4-band Cushcraft Yagi–Uda array, as well as various dipoles. Among the transmitters, the strongest was a 1.2 kW shortwave unit.

The bus itself as a mobile station was assigned the call sign HA5BUS. Radio operation modes included CW (Morse code), SSB, FM, RTTY (radioteletype), AMTOR and packet radio, and used the 3.5, 7, 14, 21, 28, 144, 432 and 1296 MHz frequency bands. The frequencies used were up 25 kHz from band edge (except on 7 MHz, where it was 7025 kHz) for CW; 3775 (outside of Australia), 3795 (in Australia only), 7075, 14275, 21375 and 28575 kHz for SSB; 7075, 14085 and 21085 kHz for RTTY.

== Journey ==
=== Overview ===
Preliminary route maps on Globex promotional materials in early 1990 included South America in the itinerary.

During the expedition, Hungarians living abroad tried assisting them by reserving hotel rooms. The team have kept a detailed technical log about all repairs being done to the bus. Early on, yachtsman József Gál (a travel partner of Nándor Fa) gave the team advice concerning group cooperation.

The team couldn't travel alongside the bus on sea routes, and it was looted multiple times during shipment. In the second half of the journey, they used phone calls extensively to communicate with people in Hungary.

There were plans to turn the team's travel diary into a book, as well as making two documentaries about the expedition; one for general audiences and one for radio amateurs, with copies of the latter being sent to the amateur radio organizations of the countries they have visited.

=== Timeline ===
The expedition officially started on 23 October 1991, when the bus and the team departed from the Heroes' Square of Budapest, Hungary at 2 pm. They spent the first night near Nyíregyháza, and on the next day they crossed the border with the newly independent Ukraine at Záhony.

Around December 1991, the bus and its crew arrived in Tehran, Iran (a country which did not formally recognize radio amateurs) without a local radio license, despite eight months of preparatory work and several written applications to the Iranian authorities, the last one of which were sent by the Hungarian telecommunications authority on their behalf. The expedition managed to obtain a written temporary permission to operate their equipment from the Frequency Department of the Telecommunication Company of Iran (TCI) after four weeks of nearly daily personal representation and lobbying at various government departments.

In early 1992, the team operated in India, where the authorities initially assigned the domestic call sign VU2GBX ("GBX" stood for Globex), but the team requested a change to the guest call sign VU/HA5BUS, which included the well-known call sign of the expedition. Their requests were deemed to be in contrary to local radio licensing regulations, but the authorities nonetheless granted them, acknowledging the international aspect and significance of the expedition. Around April, operating in Bangladesh was also problematic, but the team managed to get a permission, "activating" (making contacts from) the S2 area – Bangladesh – for the first time after a roughly 10-year period of inactivity. They operated in Bhutan around early May.

Early on, the tentative land route included Myanmar and the Malay Peninsula (Thailand, Malaysia) towards Singapore as well, but this part of the route was skipped due to concerns about the hostilities in Myanmar, and therefore the bus was shipped from Kolkata to Sydney through Singapore, affecting the team's schedule. They also had to skip their plan to land in Perth and cross the Nullarbor Plain eastwards because of shipping logistics. The expedition arrived in Australia on 20 July 1992. While staying in Sydney, the team had radio equipment problems, which was solved with the help of the Melbourne-based, Australian branch of Icom. Around November, one the main sponsors in Budapest filed for bankruptcy, this, coupled with the Kolkata–Singapore–Sydney shipping costs, presented serious funding issues for the expedition. In Australia, they have traveled a distance of around 10,000 km (6,200 mi). The team left the country at the end of October, when the bus was shipped to Los Angeles, United States.

The team and the bus was in the United States by January 1993. At this time, the expedition already lost the financial sponsorship of MOGÜRT and Lehel. The shipment to North America costed the team $15000, which they couldn't pay in full, and consequently, the bus was impounded in the Los Angeles harbor. The vehicle was at risk being put up for auction if the team didn't pay in 120 days. Trying to avert this, they even sent a letter to Árpád Göncz, then President of Hungary and to Mihály Kupa, then Minister of Finance, to request aid. Around this time, the team have stated that they have spent $23000–24000 so far, and they will need $40000–50000 more to get the bus back home to Hungary.

By March 1993, the financial setbacks were solved, however the Federal Communications Commission (FCC) denied the team's request to operate using their suggested guest call sign, W/HA5BUS, and thus there was no radio activity in the US. After being informed about the expedition by Pál Tar, the Hungarian ambassador, the chairwoman of the Hungarian American Cultural Association (HACA) of Houston at the time decided to sponsor them. While being in the US, the team attended the 1993 Dayton Hamvention. In May, the team reported that they have used around 14,300 L (3,800 US gal) of diesel fuel. The bus departed from the country towards Europe from Jacksonville, the team departed from Miami.

By the middle of June 1993, the team was in Bremerhaven, Germany.

The expedition finally arrived back in Hungary on 27 June 1993, when they crossed the Austrian border at Hegyeshalom.

At the event organized to celebrate the arrival, there were a number of key people present; József Végvári, marketing director of Ikarus, expressed his surprise about the condition of the bus. Zoltán Vadnai, director of the Mátyásföld factory of Ikarus, also expected the expedition's vehicle to be "in a way worse condition". Péter Ákos Bod, director of the Hungarian National Bank and former Minister of Industry, thanked the team for their efforts and expressed his pride in their achievements.

The countries that the team have traveled through are listed in the following table:

Hungarian World Bus & DX-Pedition itinerary (Note: This table is not a precise itinerary, as the team traveled between some of the countries back and forth (India–Bangladesh–India, India–Bhutan–India, US–Canada–US) at certain parts of the journey.)
Country	Places visited	Local call sign(s)	Notes
Hungary	Budapest: Heroes' Square; Nyíregyháza, Záhony	HA5BUS	starting and ending country
Ukraine	unknown	na.	formerly a part of the SU as the Ukrainian SSR until 24 August 1991
Russia	unknown	UA/HA5BUS	formerly a part of the SU as the Russian SFSR until 12 December 1991
Georgia	unknown	na.	formerly a part of the SU as the Georgian SSR until 9 April 1991
Turkey	unknown	na.	
Iran	Tehran	EP/HA5BUS	operated while Iran did not formally recognize radio amateurs
Pakistan	unknown	na.	
India	Delhi: Lal Qila/Red Fort, Lotus Temple; Agra: Taj Mahal; Temples of Khajuraho	VU2GBX (Note: This was the domestic call sign that was initially assigned by the Indian authorities, but the team requested a change to a guest call sign that includes the well-known call sign of the expedition.); VU/HA5BUS	
Bangladesh	Dhaka	S2/HA5BUS	
Bhutan	unknown	A5/HA5BUS	
Singapore	unknown	na.	
Australia	Sydney: Sydney Opera House, Dural; Canberra, Melbourne, Adelaide, Alice Springs, Uluru/Ayers Rock, Queensland, Brisbane	VK5BUS	
United States	Los Angeles (CA), Long Beach (CA), San Francisco (CA), Grand Canyon (AZ), Dayton (OH), Jacksonville (FL), Miami (FL)	none (Note: The team applied for a license to use the guest call sign W/HA5BUS, but this was denied by the FCC.)	didn't operate due to the FCC denying the requested guest call sign
Canada	Toronto, Montreal	VE3/HA5BUS; VE4/HA5BUS	
Germany	Bremerhaven	DE/HA5BUS	
Austria	unknown	na.	
Hungary	Hegyeshalom, Budapest: Heroes' Square	HA5BUS	starting and ending country

== See also ==
- Hanzelka and Zikmund – a duo of Czech engineers who traveled the world with a Tatra 87
- Budapest-Bamako – an amateur rally raid in which Ikarus buses also have participated in the past
- List of DX-peditions
