= Clipperton Island =

Atoll in the eastern Pacific Ocean

Clipperton
Native name: La Passion–Clipperton (French)
- Clipperton Atoll with lagoon with depths (metres)

- Location of Clipperton Island

- Location in the Pacific Ocean

Geography
- Location: Pacific Ocean
- Coordinates: 10°18′N 109°13′W
- Archipelago: Lagoon
- Area: 8.9 km^{2} (3.4 sq mi)
- Length: 3 km (1.9 mi)
- Width: 4 km (2.5 mi)
- Coastline: 11.1 km (6.9 mi)
- Highest elevation: 29 m (95 ft)
- Highest point: Clipperton Rock

Administration
- France
- State private property: Île de Clipperton

Demographics
- Population: 0 (1945)

Additional information
- Time zone: CIST (UTC-8)
- Postal code: 98799 (Note: The island is assigned a French postal code, but there is no post office on the island.)
- INSEE code: 989; EEZ: 431,273 km^{2} (166,515 sq mi)

Clipperton Island (French: La Passion–Clipperton [la pasjɔ̃ klipœʁtɔn]; Spanish: Isla de la Pasión), also known as Clipperton Atoll and previously as Clipperton's Rock, is an 8.9 km^{2} (3.4 sq mi) uninhabited coral atoll in the eastern Pacific Ocean. The only French territory in the North Pacific, Clipperton is 10,675 km (5,764 nmi) from Paris, France; 5,400 km (2,900 nmi) from Papeete, French Polynesia; and 1,280 km (690 nmi) from Acapulco, Guerrero.

Clipperton was documented by French merchant-explorers in 1711 and formally claimed as part of the French protectorate of Tahiti in 1858. Despite this, American guano miners began working the island in the early 1890s. As interest in the island grew, Mexico asserted a claim to the island based upon Spanish records from the 1520s that may have identified the island. Mexico established a small military colony on the island in 1905. During the Mexican Revolution, contact with the mainland became infrequent, most of the colonists died, and lighthouse keeper Victoriano Álvarez instituted a short, brutal reign as "king" of the island. Eleven survivors were rescued in 1917 and Clipperton was abandoned.

The dispute between Mexico and France over Clipperton was taken to binding international arbitration in 1909. Victor Emmanuel III, King of Italy, was chosen as arbitrator and decided in 1931 that the island was French territory. Despite the ruling, Clipperton remained largely uninhabited until 1944 when the U.S. Navy established a weather station on the island to support its war efforts in the Pacific. France protested and, as concerns about Japanese activity in the eastern Pacific waned, the U.S. abandoned the site in late 1945.

Since the end of World War II, Clipperton has primarily been the site for scientific expeditions to study the island's wildlife and marine life, including its significant masked and brown booby colonies. It has also hosted climate scientists and amateur radio DX-peditions. Plans to develop the island for trade and tourism have been considered, but none have been enacted and the island remains mostly uninhabited, with periodic visits from the French Navy.

== Geography ==
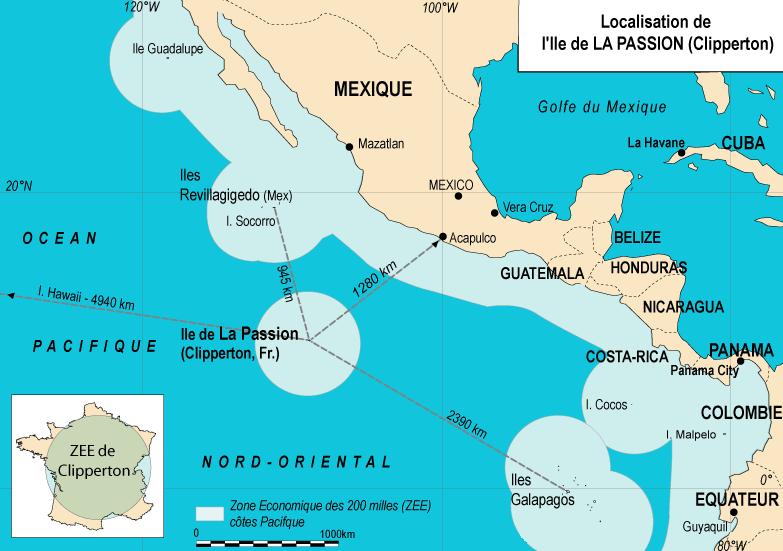
Location of Clipperton Island

The coral island is located at 10°18′N 109°13′W in the East Pacific, 1,080 km (583 nmi) southwest of Mexico, 2,424 km (1,309 nmi) west of Nicaragua, 2,545 km (1,374 nmi) west of Costa Rica, and 2,390 km (1,290 nmi) northwest of the Galápagos Islands in Ecuador. The nearest land is Socorro Island, about 945 km (510 nmi) to the northwest in the Revillagigedo Archipelago. The nearest French-owned island is Hiva Oa in the Marquesas Islands of French Polynesia, which is about 3,300 km (1,781 nmi) southwest of Clipperton.

Despite its proximity to North America, Clipperton is often considered one of the eastern-most points of Oceania because it is part of the French Indo-Pacific, and its marine fauna are similar to those of Hawaii and Kiribati's Line Islands—Clipperton lies on Eastern Tropical Pacific migration paths. The island is the only emerged part of the East Pacific Rise, as well as the only feature in the Clipperton fracture zone that breaks the ocean's surface, and it is one of the few islands in the Pacific that lacks an underwater archipelagic apron.

The atoll is low-lying and largely barren, with some scattered grasses, and a few clumps of coconut palms (Cocos nucifera). The land ring surrounding the lagoon measures 1.7 square kilometres (0.66 mi^{2}) in area with an average elevation of 2 m (6.6 ft), although a small volcanic outcropping, referred to as Clipperton Rock (Rocher de Clipperton), rises to 29 m (95 ft) on its southeast side. The surrounding 3.7-square-kilometre (1.4 mi^{2}) reef hosts an abundance of corals and is partly exposed at low tide. In 2001 a geodetic marker was placed to evaluate if the land is rising or sinking.

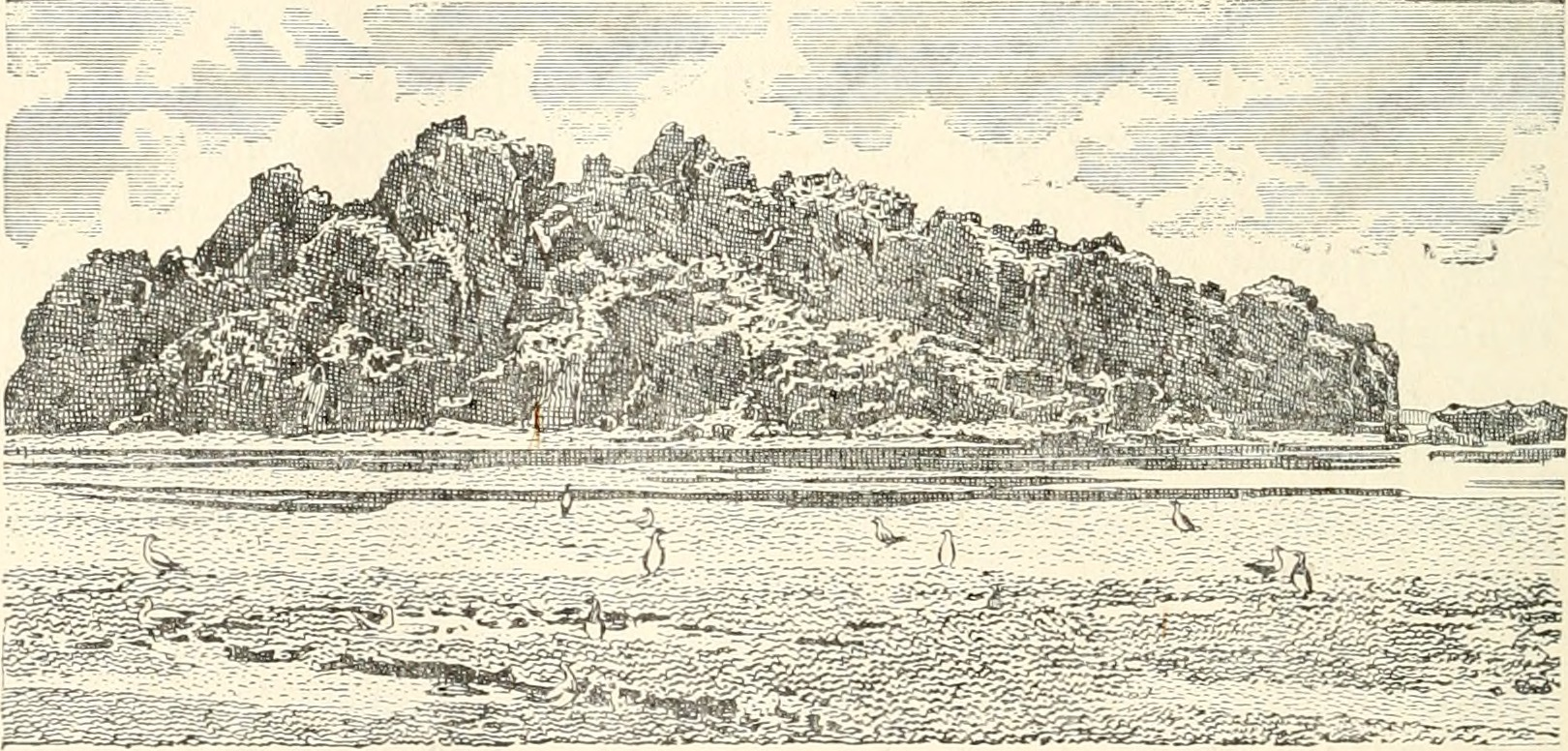
1899 sketch of Clipperton Rock from the Bulletin of the Museum of Comparative Zoology at Harvard College, after a photograph

Clipperton Rock is the remains of the island's now extinct volcano's rim; because it includes this rocky outcropping, Clipperton is not a true atoll and is sometimes referred to as a 'near-atoll'. The surrounding reef in combination with the weather makes landing on the island difficult and anchoring offshore hazardous for larger ships; in the 1940s American ships reported active problems in this regard.

== Environment ==
The environment of Clipperton Island has been studied extensively with the first recordings and sample collection being done in the 1800s. Modern research on Clipperton is focused primarily on climate science and migratory wildlife.

The SURPACLIP oceanographic expedition, a joint undertaking by the National Autonomous University of Mexico and the University of New Caledonia Nouméa, made extensive studies of the island in 1997. In 2001, French National Centre for Scientific Research geographer Christian Jost extended the 1997 studies through the French Passion 2001 expedition, which focused on the evolution of Clipperton's ecosystem. In 2003, cinematographer Lance Milbrand stayed on the island for 41 days, recording the adventure for the National Geographic Explorer and plotting a GPS map of Clipperton for the National Geographic Society.

In 2005, a four-month scientific mission organised by Jean-Louis Étienne made a complete inventory of Clipperton's mineral, plant, and animal species; studied algae as deep as 100 m (328 ft) below sea level; and examined the effects of pollution. A 2008 expedition from the University of Washington's School of Oceanography collected sediment cores from the lagoon to study climate change over the past millennium.

=== Lagoon ===
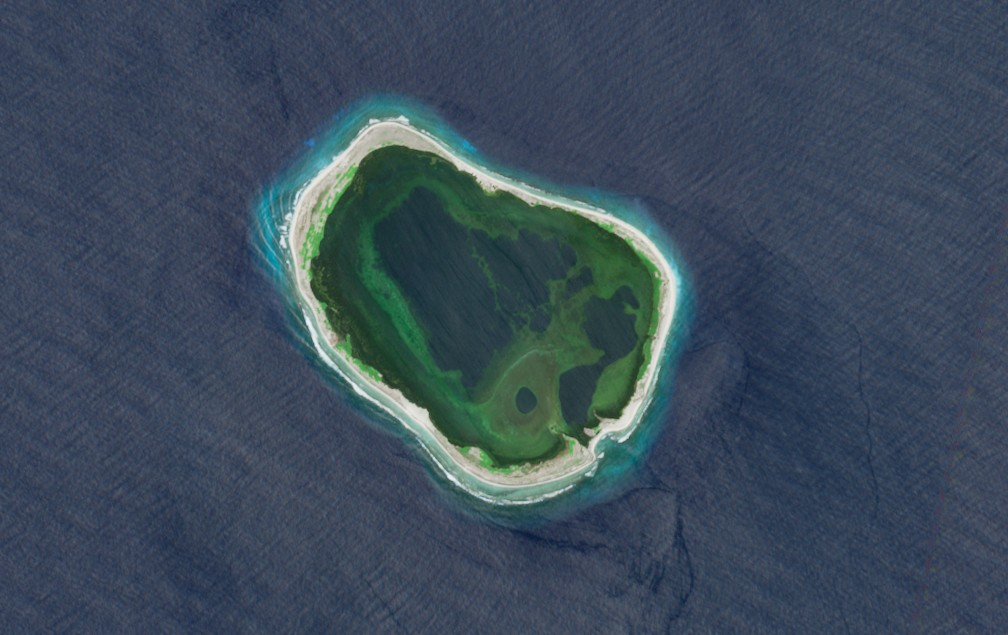
Clipperton Island photographed by the Sentinel-2 satellite.

Clipperton is a ring-shaped atoll that completely encloses a stagnant fresh water lagoon and measures 12 km (7.5 mi) in circumference and 720 hectares (2.8 sq mi) in area. The island is the only coral island in the eastern Pacific. The lagoon is devoid of fish, and is shallow over large parts except for some deep basins with depths of 43–72 m (141–236 ft), including a spot known as Trou Sans Fond ('the bottomless hole') with acidic water at its base. The water is described as being almost fresh at the surface and highly eutrophic. Seaweed beds cover approximately 45% of the lagoon's surface. The rim averages 150 m (490 ft) in width, reaching 400 m (1,300 ft) in the west, and narrowing to 45 m (148 ft) in the north-east, where sea waves occasionally spill over into the lagoon. Ten islets are present in the lagoon, six of which are covered with vegetation, including the Egg Islands (les îles aux Œufs).

The closure of the lagoon approximately 170 years ago and prevention of seawater from entering the lagoon has formed a meromictic lake. The bottom of the shallow parts of the lake contain eroded coral heads from when the lagoon was last connected with the ocean. During visits in 1897 and 1898 the depth at the middle of the lagoon was recorded as being between two inches and two feet due to the dead coral. The surface of the lagoon has a high concentration of phytoplankton that vary slightly with the seasons. As a result of this the water columns are stratified and do not mix leaving the lagoon with an oxic and brackish upper water layer and a deep sulphuric anoxic saline layer. At a depth of approximately 15 m (49 ft) the water shifts with salinity rising and both pH and oxygen quickly decreasing. The deepest levels of the lagoon record waters enriched with hydrogen sulfide which prevent the growth of coral. Before the lagoon was closed off to seawater, coral and clams were able to survive in the area as evident by fossilised specimens.

Studies of the water have found that microbial communities on the water's surface are similar to other water samples from around the world with deeper water samples showing a great diversity of both bacteria and archaea. In 2005, a group of French scientists discovered three dinoflagellate microalgae species in the lagoon: Peridiniopsis cristata, which was abundant; Durinskia baltica, which was known to exist previously in other locations, but was new to Clipperton; and Peridiniopsis cristata var. tubulifera, which is unique to the island. The lagoon also harbours millions of isopods, which are reported to deliver a painful bite.

While some sources have rated the lagoon water as non-potable, testimony from the crew of the tuna clipper M/V Monarch, stranded for 23 days in 1962 after their boat sank, indicates otherwise. Their report reveals that the lagoon water, while "muddy and dirty", was drinkable, despite not tasting very good. Several of the castaways drank it, with no apparent ill effects. Survivors of a Mexican military colony in 1917 (see below) indicated that they were dependent upon rain for their water supply, catching it in old boats. American servicemen on the island during World War II had to use evaporators to desalinate the lagoon's water. Aside from the lagoon and water caught from rain, no freshwater sources are known to exist.

=== Climate ===
The island has a tropical oceanic climate, with average temperatures of 20–32 °C (68–90 °F) and highs up to 37.8 °C (100.0 °F). Annual rainfall is 3,000 to 5,000 millimetres (120 to 200 in), and the humidity level is generally between 85 per cent and 95 per cent with December to March being the drier months. The prevailing winds are the southeast trade winds. The rainy season occurs from May to October, and the region is subject to tropical cyclones from April to September, but such storms often pass to the northeast of Clipperton. In 1997 Clipperton was in the path of the start of Hurricane Felicia, as well as Hurricane Sandra in 2015. In addition, Clipperton has been subjected to multiple tropical storms and depressions, including Tropical Storm Andres in 2003. Surrounding ocean waters are warm, pushed by equatorial and counter-equatorial currents and have seen temperature increases due to global warming.

=== Flora and fauna ===
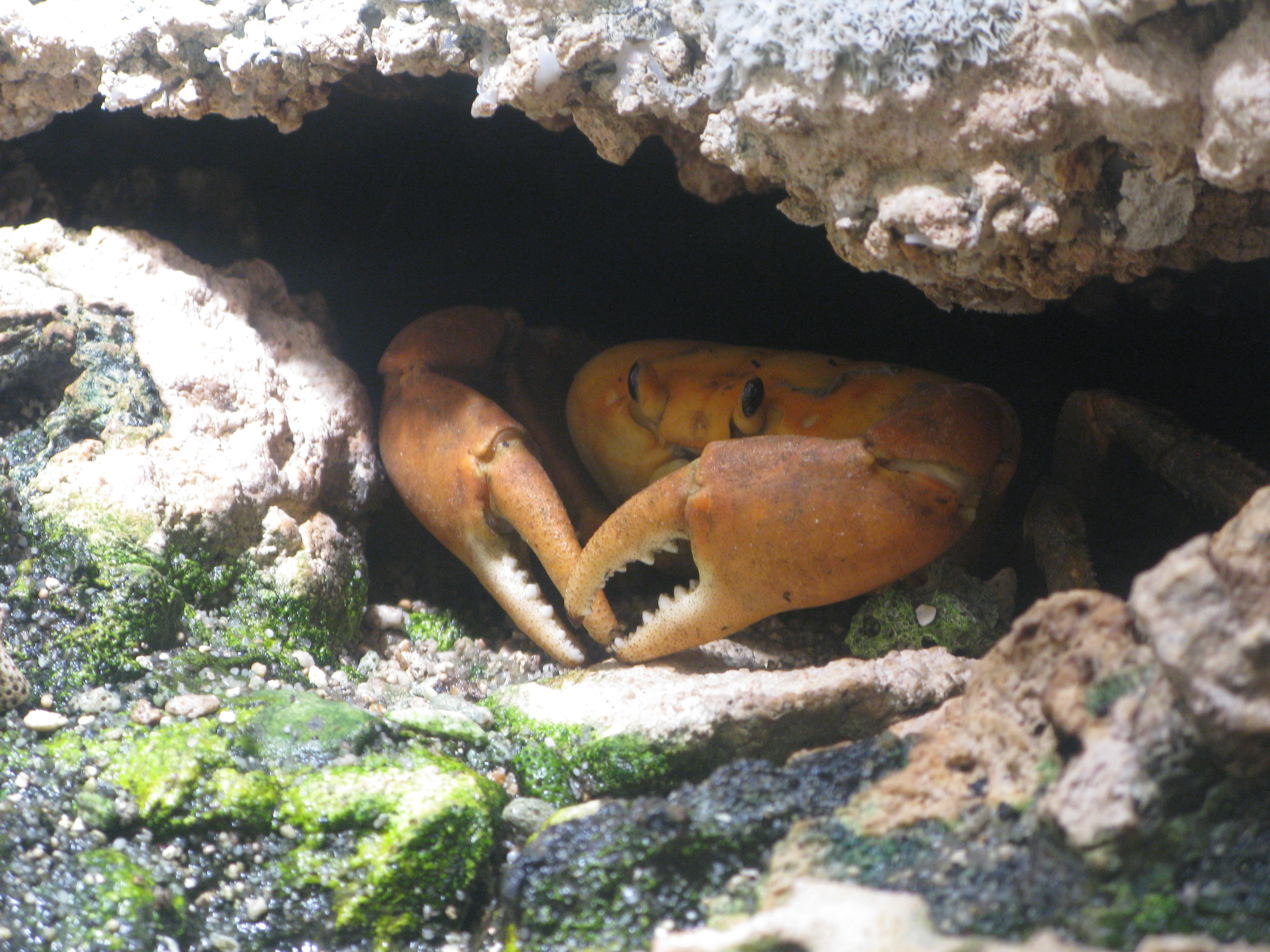
A bright-orange Clipperton crab (Johngarthia oceanica)

When Snodgrass and Heller visited in 1898, they reported that "no land plant is native to the island". Historical accounts from 1711, 1825, and 1839 show a low grassy or suffrutescent (partially woody) flora. During Marie-Hélène Sachet's visit in 1958, the vegetation was found to consist of a sparse cover of spiny grass and low thickets, a creeping plant (Ipomoea spp.), and stands of coconut palm. This low-lying herbaceous flora seems to be a pioneer in nature, and most of it is believed to be composed of recently introduced species. Sachet suspected that Heliotropium curassavicum, and possibly Portulaca oleracea, were native. Coconut palms and pigs introduced in the 1890s by guano miners were still present in the 1940s. The largest coconut grove is Bougainville Wood (Bois de Bougainville) on the southwestern end of the island. On the northwest side of the atoll, the most abundant plant species are Cenchrus echinatus, Sida rhombifolia, and Corchorus aestuans. These plants compose a shrub cover up to 30 cm (12 in) in height, and are intermixed with Eclipta, Phyllanthus, and Solanum, as well as the taller Brassica juncea. The islets in the lagoon are primarily vegetated with Cyperaceae, Scrophulariaceae, and Ipomoea pes-caprae. A unique feature of Clipperton is that the vegetation is arranged in parallel rows of species, with dense rows of taller species alternating with lower, more open vegetation. This was assumed to be a result of the trench-digging method of phosphate mining used by guano hunters.

The only land animals known to exist are two species of reptiles (the Pacific stump-toed gecko and the copper-tailed skink), bright-orange land crabs known as Clipperton crabs (Johngarthia oceanica, prior to 2019 classified as Johngartia planata), birds, and ship rats. The rats probably arrived when large fishing boats wrecked on the island in 1999 and 2000.

The pigs introduced in the 1890s reduced the crab population, which in turn allowed grassland to gradually cover about 80 per cent of the land surface. The elimination of these pigs in 1958, the result of a personal project by Kenneth E. Stager, caused most of this vegetation to disappear as the population of land crabs recovered. As a result, Clipperton is mostly a sandy desert with only 674 palms counted by Christian Jost during the Passion 2001 French mission and five islets in the lagoon with grass that the terrestrial crabs cannot reach. A 2005 report by the National Oceanic and Atmospheric Administration's Southwest Fisheries Science Center indicated that after the introduction of rats and their increased presence has led to a decline in both crab and bird populations, causing a corresponding increase in both vegetation and coconut palms. This report urgently recommended eradication of rats, which have been destroying bird nesting sites and the crab population, so that vegetation might be reduced, and the island might return to its 'pre-human' state.

In 1825, Benjamin Morrell reported finding green sea turtles nesting on Clipperton, but later expeditions have not found nesting turtles there, possibly due to disruption from guano extraction, as well as the introduction of pigs and rats. Sea turtles found on the island appear to have been injured due to fishing practices. Morrell also reported fur and elephant seals on the island in 1825, but they too have not been recorded by later expeditions.

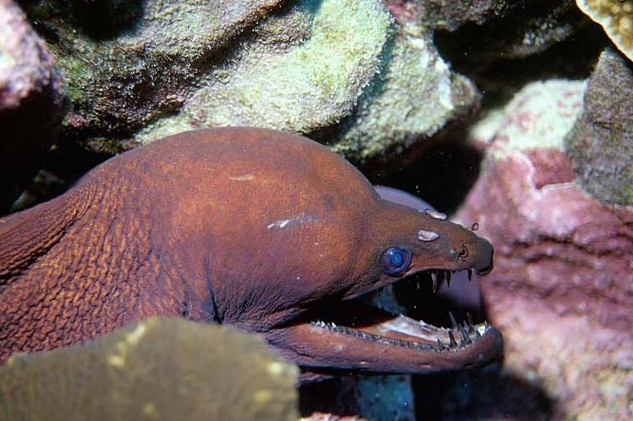
The head of a viper moray (Enchelynassa canina)

Birds are common on the island; Morrell noted in 1825: "The whole island is literally covered with sea-birds, such as gulls, whale-birds, gannets, and the booby". Thirteen species of birds are known to breed on the island and 26 others have been observed as visitors. The island has been identified as an Important Bird Area by BirdLife International because of the large breeding colony of masked boobies, with 110,000 individual birds recorded. Observed bird species include white terns, masked boobies, sooty terns, Cocos boobies, brown noddies, black noddies, great frigatebirds, coots, martins (swallows), cuckoos, and yellow warblers. Ducks and moorhens have been reported in the lagoon.

The coral reef on the north side of the island includes colonies more than 2 metres (6.6 ft) high. The 2018 Tara Pacific expedition located five colonies of Millepora platyphylla at depths of 28–32 metres (92–105 ft), the first of this fire coral species known in the region. Among the Porites spp. stony corals, some bleaching was observed, along with other indications of disease or stress, including parasitic worms and microalgae.

The reefs that surround Clipperton have some of the highest concentration of endemic species found anywhere with more than 115 species identified. Many species are recorded in the area, including five or six endemics, such as Clipperton angelfish (Holacanthus limbaughi), Clipperton grouper (Epinephelus clippertonensis), Clipperton damselfish (Stegastes baldwini) and Robertson's wrasse (Thalassoma robertsoni). Widespread species around the reefs include Pacific creolefish, blue-and-gold snapper, and various species of goatfish. In the water column, trevallies are predominant, including black jacks, bigeye trevally, and bluefin trevally. Also common around Clipperton are black triggerfish;, several species of groupers, including leather bass and starry groupers; Mexican hogfish; whitecheek, convict, and striped-fin surgeonfish; yellow longnose and blacknosed butterflyfish; coral hawkfish; golden pufferfish; Moorish idols; parrotfish; and moray eels, especially speckled moray eels. The waters around the island are an important nursery for sharks, particularly the white tip shark. Galapagos sharks, reef sharks, whale sharks, and hammerhead sharks are also present around Clipperton.

Three expeditions to Clipperton have collected sponge specimens, including U.S. President Franklin Roosevelt's visit in 1938. Of the 190 specimens collected, 20 species were noted, including nine found only at Clipperton. One of the endemic sponges, collected during the 1938 visit, was named Callyspongia roosevelti in honour of Roosevelt.

In April 2009, Steven Robinson, a tropical fish dealer from Hayward, California, travelled to Clipperton to collect Clipperton angelfish. Upon his return to the United States, he described the 52 illegally collected fish to federal wildlife authorities as king angelfish, not the rarer Clipperton angelfish, which he intended to sell for $10,000. On 15 December 2011, Robinson was sentenced to 45 days of incarceration, one year of probation, and a $2,000 fine.

=== Environmental near-miss ===
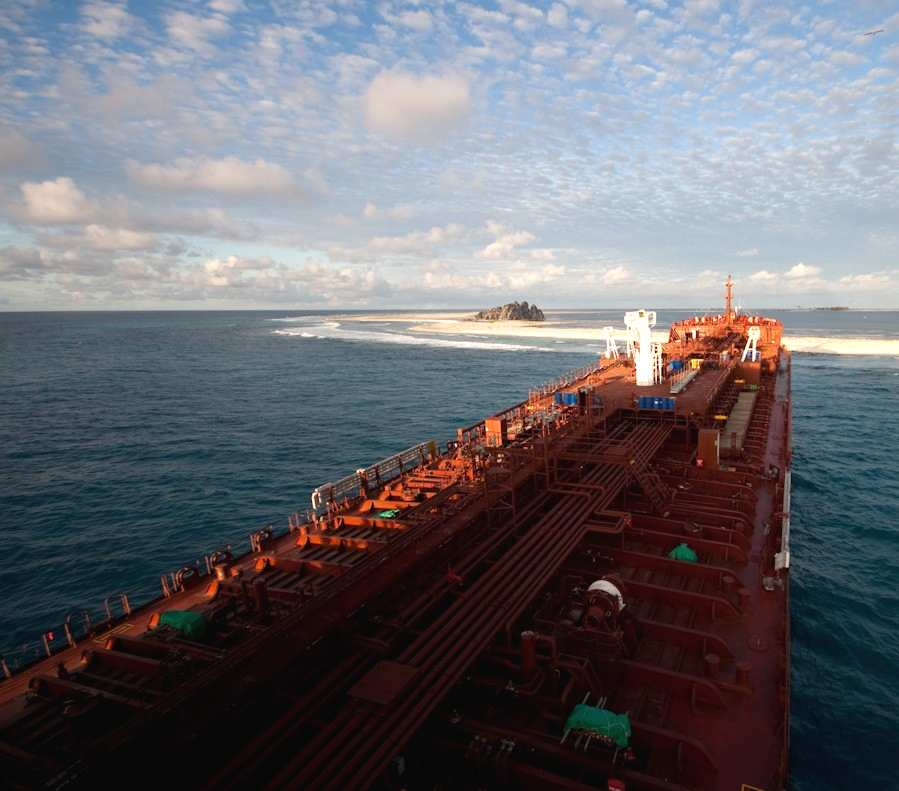
Freighter Sichem Osprey grounded on Clipperton Island in 2010

During the night of 10 February 2010, the Sichem Osprey, a Maltese chemical tanker, ran aground en route from the Panama Canal to South Korea. The 170 m (558 ft) ship contained 10,513 metric tons (11,589 short tons) of xylene, 6,005 metric tons (6,619 short tons) of soybean oil, and 6,000 metric tons (6,600 short tons) of tallow. All 19 crew members were reported safe, and the vessel reported no leaks. The vessel was re-floated on 6 March and returned to service.

=== Environmental damage ===
In mid-March 2012, the crew from the Clipperton Project noted the widespread presence of refuse, particularly on the northeast shore, and around the Clipperton Rock. Debris, including plastic bottles and containers, present harms to the island's flora and fauna. It is endemic, to two beaches, northeast and southwest. Other refuse has been left after the occupations by Americans 1944–1945, French 1966–1969, and the 2008 scientific expedition. During a 2015 scientific and amateur radio expedition to Clipperton, the operating team discovered a package that contained 1.2 kilograms (2.6 lb) of cocaine, likely discarded (flotsam). In April 2023, the Passion 23 mission by France's Armed Forces in the Antilles and the surveillance frigate Germinal collected more than 200 kilograms (440 lb) of plastic waste from the beaches and a packet of cocaine.

The Sea Around Us Project estimates the Clipperton EEZ is fished for some 50,000 metric tons (55,000 short tons) of fish per year; as French naval patrols locally are infrequent, this includes a proportion of illegal fishing, along with lobster harvesting and shark finning, resulting in estimated losses for France of €420 per illegal ton.

As deep-sea mining of polymetallic nodules increases in the adjacent Clarion–Clipperton zone. Similar mining activity within France's EEZ closer to the atoll may well multiply any marine damage, being discovered there during the Passion 2015 expedition.

== Politics and government ==
The island is an overseas state private property of France under direct authority of the Minister of the Overseas. Although the island is French territory, it has no status within the European Union. Ownership of Clipperton Island was disputed in the 19th and early 20th centuries between France and Mexico, but was finally settled through arbitration in 1931; the Clipperton Island Case remains widely studied in international law textbooks.

In the late 1930s, as flying boats opened the Pacific to air travel, Clipperton Island was noted as a possible waypoint for a trans-Pacific route from the Americas to Asia via the Marquesas Islands in French Polynesia, bypassing Hawaii. However, France indicated no interest in developing commercial air traffic in the corridor.

After France ratified the United Nations Convention on the Law of the Sea (UNCLOS) in 1996, it reaffirmed the exclusive economic zone around Clipperton Island, which had been established in 1976. After changes were made to the area nations were allowed to claim under the third convention of UNCLOS, France in 2018 expanded the outer limits of the territorial sea to 22 km (12 nmi) and the exclusive economic zone off Clipperton Island to 370 km (200 nmi), encompassing 431,273 square kilometres (166,515 mi^{2}) of ocean.

On 21 February 2007, administration of Clipperton was transferred from the High Commissioner of the Republic in French Polynesia to the Minister of Overseas France.

In 2015, French MP Philippe Folliot set foot on Clipperton becoming the first elected official from France to do so. Folliot noted that visiting Clipperton was something he had wanted to do since he was nine years old. Following the visit, Folliot reported to the National Assembly on the pressing need to reaffirm French sovereignty over the atoll and its surrounding maritime claims. He also proposed establishing an international scientific research station on Clipperton and administrative reforms surrounding the oversight of the atoll.

In 2022, France passed legislation officially referring to the island as "La Passion–Clipperton".

== History ==
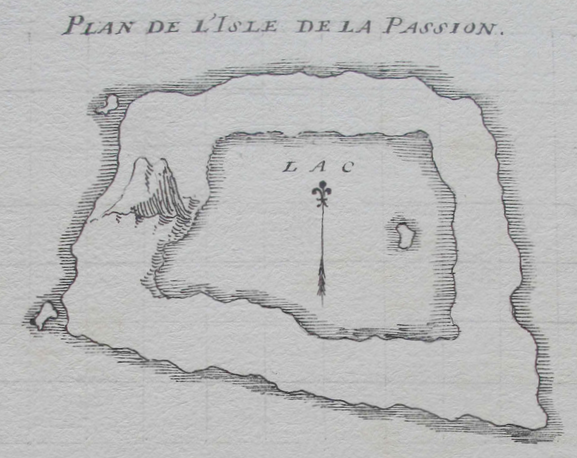
Sketch of "l'Isle de la Passion" (Clipperton) from La Princesse's ship's diary (1711)

=== Discovery and early claims ===
There are several claims to the first discovery of the island. The earliest recorded possible sighting is 24 January 1521 when Portuguese-born Spanish explorer Ferdinand Magellan discovered an island he named San Pablo after turning westward away from the American mainland during his circumnavigation of the globe. On 15 November 1528, Spaniard Álvaro de Saavedra Cerón discovered an island he called Isla Médanos in the region while on an expedition commissioned by his cousin, the Spanish conquistador Hernán Cortés, to find a route to the Philippines.

Although both San Pablo and Isla Médanos are considered to be possible sightings of Clipperton, the island was first charted by French merchant Michel Dubocage, commanding La Découverte, who arrived at the island on Good Friday, 3 April 1711; he was joined the following day by fellow ship captain Martin de Chassiron and La Princesse. The island was given the name Île de la Passion ('Passion Island') as the date of rediscovery fell within Passiontide. They drew up the first map of the island and claimed it for France.

In August 1825, American sea captain Benjamin Morrell made the first recorded landing on Clipperton, exploring the island and making a detailed report of its vegetation.

The common name for the island comes from John Clipperton, an English pirate and privateer, who fought the Spanish during the early 18th century and is said to have passed by the island. Some sources claim that he used it as a base for his raids on shipping.

=== 19th century ===
==== Mexican claim 1821–1858 ====
After its declaration of independence in 1821, Mexico took possession of the lands that had once belonged to Spain. As Spanish records noted the existence of the island as early as 1528, the territory was incorporated into Mexico. The Mexican constitution of 1917 explicitly includes the island, using the Spanish name La Pasión, as Mexican territory. This would be amended on January 18, 1934, after the sovereignty dispute over the island was settled in favour of France.

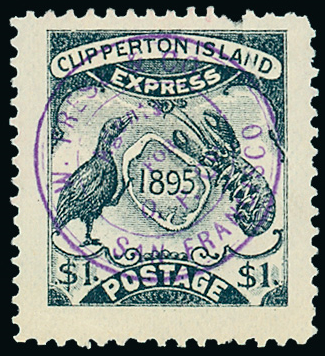
1895 $1 stamp of Clipperton Island, issued by W. Frese & Co. as an agent of the Oceanic Phosphate Company. The local post stamps were used for mail travelling between Clipperton and San Francisco.

El territorio nacional comprende el de las partes integrantes de la Federación y además el de las islas adyacentes en ambos mares. Comprende, asimismo, la isla de Guadalupe, las de Revillagigedo y la de la Pasión, situadas en el océano Pacífico.
The national territory includes that of the integral parts of the Federation and also that of the adjacent islands in both seas. It also includes the island of Guadalupe, Revillagigedo and La Pasión, located in the Pacific Ocean.

— Mexican Constitution of 1917

==== French claim (1858) ====
In April 1858, French minister Eugène Rouher reached an agreement with a Mr. Lockhard of Le Havre to claim oceanic islands in the Pacific for the exploitation of guano deposits. On 17 November 1858, Emperor Napoleon III formally annexed Clipperton as part of the French protectorate of Tahiti. Sailing aboard Lockhart's ship Amiral, Ship-of-the-line Lieutenant Victor Le Coat de Kervéguen published a notice of this annexation in Hawaiian newspapers to further cement France's claim to the island.

==== Guano mining claims (1892–1905) ====
In 1892, a claim on the island was filed with the U.S. State Department under the U.S. Guano Islands Act by Frederick W. Permien of San Francisco on behalf of the Stonington Phosphate Company. In 1893, Permien transferred those rights to a new company, the Oceanic Phosphate Company. In response to the application, the State Department rejected the claim, noting France's prior claim on the island and that the claim was not bonded as was required by law. Additionally during this time there were concerns in Mexico that the British or Americans would lay claim to the island.

Despite the lack of U.S. approval of its claim, the Oceanic Phosphate Company began mining guano on the island in 1895. Although the company had plans for as many as 200 workers on the island, at its peak only 25 men were stationed there. The company shipped its guano to Honolulu and San Francisco where it sold for between US$10 and US$20 per ton. In 1897, the Oceanic Phosphate Company began negotiations with the British Pacific Islands Company to transfer its interest in Clipperton; this drew the attention of both French and Mexican officials.

On 24 November 1897, French naval authorities arrived on the Duguay Trouin and found three Americans working on the island. The French ordered the American flag to be lowered. At that time, U.S. authorities assured the French that they did not intend to assert American sovereignty over the island. A few weeks later, on 13 December 1897, Mexico sent the gunboat La Demócrata and a group of marines to assert its claim on the island, evicting the Americans, raising the Mexican flag, and drawing a protest from France. From 1898 to 1905, the Pacific Islands Company worked the Clipperton guano deposits under a concession agreement with Mexico. In 1898, Mexico made a US$1.5 million claim against the Oceanic Phosphate Company for the guano shipped from the island from 1895 to 1897.

=== 20th century ===
==== Mexican colonisation (1905–1917) ====
In 1905, the Mexican government renegotiated its agreement with the British Pacific Islands Company, establishing a military garrison on the island a year later and erecting a lighthouse under the orders of Mexican President Porfirio Díaz. Captain Ramón Arnaud was appointed governor of Clipperton. At first he was reluctant to accept the post, believing it amounted to exile from Mexico, but he relented after being told that Díaz had personally chosen him to protect Mexico's interests in the international conflict with France. It was also noted that because Arnaud spoke English and French he would be well-equipped to help protect Mexico's sovereignty over the territory. He arrived on Clipperton as governor later that year.

By 1914 around 100 men, women, and children lived on the island, resupplied every two months by a ship from Acapulco. With the escalation of fighting in the Mexican Revolution, regular resupply visits ceased, and the inhabitants were left to their own devices. On 28 February 1914, the schooner Nokomis wrecked on Clipperton; with a still seaworthy lifeboat, four members of the crew volunteered to row to Acapulco for help. The USS Cleveland arrived months later to rescue the crew. While there, the captain offered to transport the survivors of the colony back to Acapulco; Arnaud refused as he believed a supply ship would soon arrive.

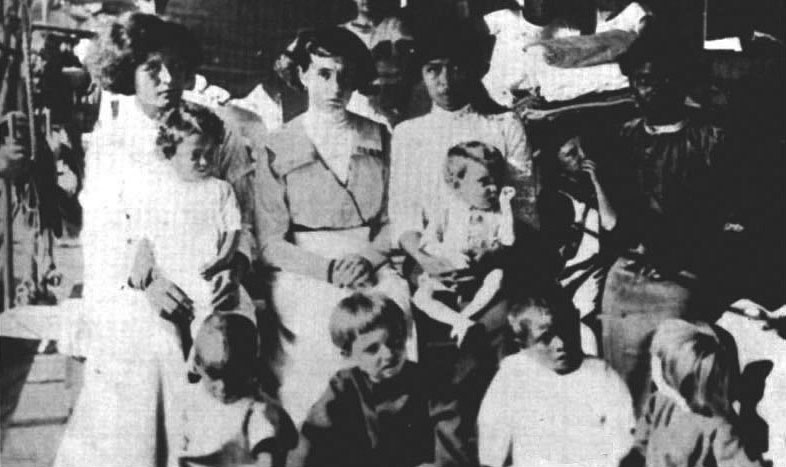
Mexican survivors from Clipperton Island, 1917

By 1917, all but one of the male inhabitants had died. Many had perished from scurvy, while others, including Arnaud, died during an attempt to sail after a passing ship to fetch help. Lighthouse keeper Victoriano Álvarez was the last man on the island, together with 15 women and children. Álvarez proclaimed himself 'king', and began a campaign of rape and murder, before being killed by Tirza Rendón, who was his favourite victim. Almost immediately after Álvarez's death, four women and seven children, the last survivors, were picked up by the U.S. Navy gunship Yorktown on 18 July 1917.

==== Final arbitration of ownership (1931) ====
Throughout Mexico's occupation of Clipperton, France insisted on its ownership of the island, and lengthy diplomatic correspondence between the two countries led to a treaty on 2 March 1909, agreeing to seek binding international arbitration by Victor Emmanuel III of Italy, with each nation promising to abide by his determination. In 1931, Victor Emmanuel III issued his arbitral decision in the Clipperton Island Case, declaring Clipperton a French possession. Mexican President Pascual Ortiz Rubio, in response to public opinion that considered the Italian king biased towards France, consulted international experts on the validity of the decision, but ultimately Mexico accepted Victor Emmanuel's findings. The Mexican press at the time raised the issue of the Monroe Doctrine with the United States, stating that the French claim had preceded its issuance. France formally took possession of Clipperton on January 26, 1935.

==== U.S. presidential visit ====
President Franklin D. Roosevelt visited Clipperton Island in July 1938 aboard the USS Houston as part of a fishing expedition to the Galápagos Islands and other points along the Central and South American coasts. At the island, Roosevelt and his party spent time fishing for sharks, and afterwards Dr. Waldo L. Schmitt of the Smithsonian Institution went ashore with some crew to gather scientific samples and make observations of the island.

Roosevelt had previously tried to visit Clipperton in July 1934 after transiting through the Panama Canal en route to Hawaii on the Houston; he had heard the area was good for fishing, but heavy seas prevented them from lowering a boat when they reached the island. On 19 July 1934, soon after the stop at Clipperton, the rigid airship USS Macon rendezvoused with the Houston, and one of the Macon's Curtiss F9C biplanes delivered mail to the president.

==== American occupation (1944–1945) ====
The Government of the United States is aware of the extent to which the French Government is desirous to cooperate, in all domains, to the success of the Allied Armies, in Europe as well as in the Pacific. It will understand, however, its concern that French sovereignty be not disregarded in any part of the empire.

— Georges Bidault,

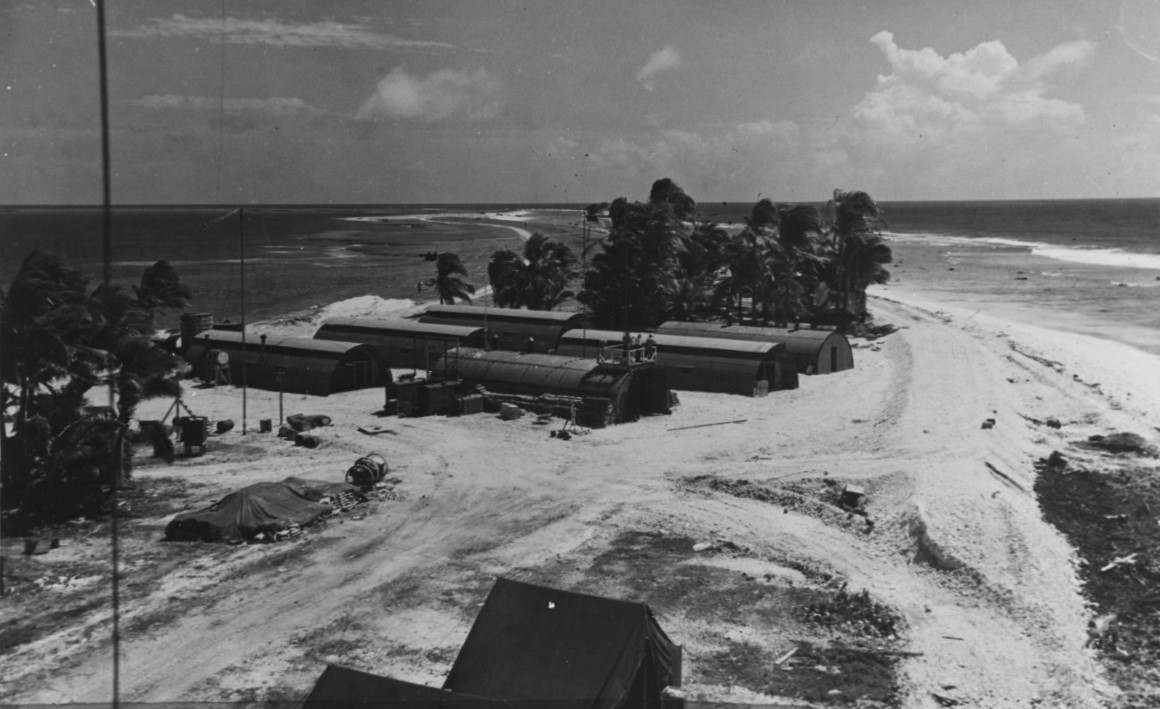
The U.S. Navy weather station on the northern side of Clipperton. View is from the top of a radio tower, looking northwest.

In April 1944, the USS Atlanta took observations of Clipperton while en route to Hawaii. After an overflight of the island by planes from the USS Detroit and USS Nevada to ensure Clipperton was uninhabited, the USS Argus departed San Francisco on 4 December 1944 with aerological specialists and personnel, arriving at Clipperton a week later, and was followed several days later by USS LST-563 with provisions, heavy equipment, and equipment for construction of a U.S. Navy weather station on the island. The sailors at the weather station were armed in case of a possible Japanese attack in the region. Landing on the island proved challenging. On 21 December, LST-563 grounded on the reef and the salvage ship USS Seize was brought in to help refloat the ship but it too was grounded. Finally, in January 1945, the USS Viking and USS Tenino were able to free the Seize and to offload equipment from LST-563 before it was abandoned.

Once the weather station was completed and sailors garrisoned on the island, the U.S. government informed the British, French, and Mexican governments of the station and its purpose. Every day at 9 a.m., the 24 sailors stationed at the Clipperton weather station sent up weather balloons to gather information. Later, Clipperton was considered for an airfield to shift traffic between North America and Australia far from the front lines of Pacific Theater.

In April 1943, during a meeting between presidents Roosevelt of the U.S. and Avila Camacho of Mexico, the topic of Mexican ownership of Clipperton was raised. The American government seemed interested in Clipperton being handed over to Mexico due to the importance the island might play in both commercial and military air travel, as well as its proximity to the Panama Canal.

Although these talks were informal, the U.S. backed away from any Mexican claim on Clipperton as Mexico had previously accepted the 1931 arbitration decision. The U.S. government also felt it would be easier to obtain a military base on the island from France. However, after the French government was notified about the weather station, relations on this matter deteriorated rapidly with the French government sending a formal note of protest in defence of French sovereignty. In response, the U.S. extended an offer for the French military to operate the station or to have the Americans agree to leave the weather station under the same framework previously agreed to with other weather stations in France and North Africa. There were additional concerns within the newly formed Provisional Government of the French Republic that notification of the installation was made to military and not civilian leadership.

Video of the crew of the USS Concord on Clipperton Island landing a Jeep and using a radio

French Foreign Minister Georges Bidault said of the incident: "This is very humiliating to us we are anxious to cooperate with you, but sometimes you do not make it easy". French Vice Admiral Raymond Fenard requested during a meeting with U.S. Admiral Lyal A. Davidson that civilians be given access to Clipperton and the surrounding waters, but the U.S. Navy denied the request because there was an active military installation on the island. Instead Davidson offered to transport a French officer to the installation and reassured the French government that the United States did not wish to claim sovereignty over the island. During these discussions between the admirals, French diplomats in Mexico attempted to hire the Mexican vessel Pez de Plata out of Acapulco to bring a military attaché to Clipperton under a cover story that they were going on a shark fishing trip. At the request of the Americans, the Mexican government refused to allow the Pez De Plata to leave port. French officials then attempted to leave in another smaller vessel and filed a false destination with the local port authorities but were also stopped by Mexican officials.

During this period, French officials in Mexico leaked information about their concerns, as well as about the arrival of seaplanes at Clipperton, to The New York Times and Newsweek; both stories were refused publishing clearance on national security grounds. In February 1945, the U.S. Navy transported French Officer Lieutenant Louis Jampierre on a 4-day trip to Clipperton out of San Diego where he visited the installation and that afternoon returned to the United States. As the war in the Pacific progressed, concerns about Japanese incursions into the Eastern Pacific were reduced and in September 1945 the U.S. Navy began removing from Clipperton. During the evacuation, munitions were destroyed, but significant matériel was left on the island. By 21 October 1945, the last U.S. Navy staff at the weather station left Clipperton.

==== Post-World War II developments ====
Since the island was abandoned by American forces at the end of World War II, the island has been visited by sports fishermen, French naval patrols, and Mexican tuna and shark fishermen. There have been infrequent scientific and amateur radio expeditions and, in 1978, Jacques-Yves Cousteau visited with a team of divers and a survivor from the 1917 evacuation to film a television special called Clipperton: The Island that Time Forgot.

The island was visited by ornithologist Ken Stager of the Los Angeles County Museum in 1958. Appalled at the depredations visited by feral pigs upon the island's brown booby and masked booby colonies (reduced to 500 and 150 birds, respectively), Stager procured a shotgun and killed all 58 pigs. By 2003, the booby colonies had grown to 25,000 brown boobies and 112,000 masked boobies, making Clipperton home to the world's second-largest brown booby colony, and its largest masked booby colony. In 1994, Stager's story inspired Bernie Tershy and Don Croll, both professors at the University of California, Santa Cruz Long Marine Lab, to found the non-profit Island Conservation, which works to prevent extinctions through the removal of invasive species from islands.

When the independence of Algeria in 1962 threatened French nuclear testing sites in North Africa, the French Ministry of Defence considered Clipperton as a possible replacement site. This was eventually ruled out due to the island's hostile climate and remote location, but the island was used to house a small scientific mission to collect data on nuclear fallout from other nuclear tests. From 1966 to 1969, the French military sent a series of missions, called "Bougainville", to the island. The Bougainville missions unloaded some 25 tons of equipment, including sanitary facilities, traditional Polynesian dwellings, drinking water treatment tanks, and generators. The missions sought to surveil the island and its surrounding waters, observe weather conditions, and evaluate potential rehabilitation of the World War II era airstrip. By 1978, the structures built during the Bougainville missions had become quite derelict. The French explored reopening the lagoon and developing a harbour for trade and tourism during the 1970s, but this too was abandoned. An automatic weather installation was completed on 7 April 1980, with data collected by the station transmitted via the Argos satellite system to the Lannion Space Meteorology Center in Brittany France.

In 1981, the Académie des sciences d'outre-mer recommended the island have its own economic infrastructure, with an airstrip and a fishing port in the lagoon. This would mean opening the lagoon to the ocean by creating a passage in the atoll rim. To oversee this, the French government reassigned Clipperton from the High Commissioner for French Polynesia to the direct authority of the French government, classifying the island as an overseas state private property administered by France's Overseas Minister. In 1986, the Company for the Study, Development and Exploitation of Clipperton Island (French acronym, SEDEIC) and French officials began outlining a plan for the development of Clipperton as a fishing port, but due to economic constraints, the distance from markets, and the small size of the atoll, nothing beyond preliminary studies was undertaken and plans for the development were abandoned. In the mid-1980s, the French government began efforts to enlist citizens of French Polynesia to settle on Clipperton; these plans were ultimately abandoned as well.

In November 1994, the French Space Agency requested the help of NASA to track the first stage breakup of the newly designed Ariane 5 rocket. After spending a month on Clipperton setting up and calibrating radar equipment to monitor Ariane flight V88, the mission ended in disappointment when the rocket disintegrated 37 seconds after launch due to a software bug.

Despite Mexico accepting the 1931 arbitration decision that Clipperton was French territory, the right of Mexican fishing vessels to work Clipperton's territorial waters have remained a point of contention. A 2007 treaty, reaffirmed in 2017, grants Mexican access to Clipperton's fisheries so long as authorisation is sought from the French government, conservation measures are followed, and catches are reported; however, the lack of regular monitoring of the fisheries by France makes verifying compliance difficult.

=== Castaways ===
In May 1893, Charles Jensen and "Brick" Thurman of the Oceanic Phosphate Company were left on the island by the company's ship Compeer with 90 days worth of supplies in order to prevent other attempts to claim the island and its guano. Before sailing for Clipperton, Jensen wrote a letter to the Secretary of the Coast Seamen's Union, Andrew Furuseth, instructing him that if the Oceanic Phosphate Company had not sent a vessel to Clipperton six weeks after the return of the Compeer to make it known that they had been stranded there. The Oceanic Phosphate Company denied it had left the men without adequate supplies and contracted the schooner Viking to retrieve them in late August. The Viking rescued the men, who had used seabirds' eggs to supplement their supplies, and returned them to San Francisco on 31 October.

In May 1897, the British cargo vessel Kinkora wrecked on Clipperton; the crew was able to salvage food and water from the ship, allowing them to survive on the island in relative comfort. During the crew's time on the island, a passing vessel offered to take the men to the mainland for $1,500, which the crew refused. Instead eight of the men loaded up a lifeboat and rowed to Acapulco for help. After the first mate of the Kinkora, Mr. McMarty, arrived in Acapulco, HMS Comus set sail from British Columbia to rescue the sailors.

In 1947, five American fishermen from San Pedro, California, were rescued from Clipperton after surviving on the island for six weeks.

In early 1962, the island provided a home to nine crewmen of the sunken tuna clipper MV Monarch, stranded for 23 days from 6 February to 1 March. They reported that the lagoon water was drinkable, although they preferred to drink water from the coconuts they found. Unable to use any of the dilapidated buildings, they constructed a crude shelter from cement bags and tin salvaged from Quonset huts built by the American military 20 years earlier. Wood from the huts was used for firewood, and fish caught off the fringing reef combined with potatoes and onions they had saved from their sinking vessel augmented the island's meager supply of coconuts. The crewmen reported they tried eating bird's eggs, but found them to be rancid, and they decided after trying to cook a 'little black bird' that it did not have enough meat to make the effort worthwhile. Pigs had been eradicated, but the crewmen reported seeing their skeletons around the atoll. The crewmen were eventually discovered by another fishing boat, and rescued by the U.S. Navy destroyer USS Robison.

=== Amateur radio DX-peditions ===
Clipperton has long been an attractive destination for amateur radio groups due to its remoteness, permit requirements, history, and interesting environment. While some radio operation has been part of other visits to the island, major DX-peditions have included FO0XB (1978), FO0XX (1985), FO0CI (1992), FO0AAA (2000), TX5C (2008), and TX5S (2024).

In March 2014, the Cordell Expedition, organised and led by Robert Schmieder, combined a radio DX-pedition using callsign TX5K with environmental and scientific investigations. The team of 24 radio operators made more than 114,000 contacts, breaking the previous record of 75,000. The activity included extensive operation in the 6-meter band, including Earth–Moon–Earth communication (EME) or 'moonbounce' contacts. A notable accomplishment was the use of DXA, a real-time satellite-based online graphic radio log web page, allowing anyone with a browser to see the radio activity. Scientific work conducted during the expedition included the first collection and identification of foraminifera and extensive aerial imaging of the island using kite-borne cameras. The team included two scientists from the University of Tahiti and a French TV documentary crew from Thalassa.

In April 2015, Alain Duchauchoy, F6BFH, operated from Clipperton using callsign TX5P as part of the Passion 2015 scientific expedition to Clipperton Island. Duchauchoy also researched Mexican use of the island during the early 1900s as part of the expedition.

== See also ==
- Uninhabited island
- Lists of islands
