= Lehel (disambiguation) =

Lehel (died 955) was a Magyar leader.

Lehel may also refer to:

- A district of Munich, Germany, part of the borough of Altstadt-Lehel
- Lehel (appliances), a Hungarian appliance company
- Lehel tér (Budapest Metro), a Budapest Metro station
- Lehel (Munich U-Bahn), a Munich U-Bahn station
- Peter Lehel (born 1965), German jazz saxophonist and composer
- György Lehel (1926–1989), Hungarian musician
