= Christian Jost =

Christian Jost may refer to:

- Falk Maria Schlegel (born 1975), German keyboardist, real name Christian Jost
- Christian Jost (geographer), French geographer
- Christian Jost (composer) (born 1963), German composer, conductor, and pianist
