= 3Y0J Bouvet Island DXpedition =

Amateur radio DXpedition to Bouvet Island

- Location of Bouvet Island

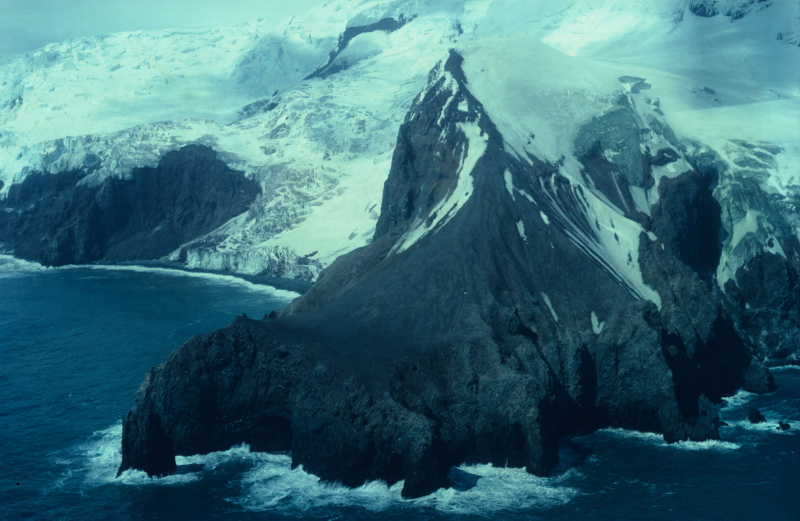
- Photo of the coast of Bouvet Island
- Dates operated: February 6–13, 2023
- Bands operated: 12,15,17,30m
- Modes used: CW, SSB, FT8
- Number of contacts: 7000
- Number of operators: 13
- Website: 3y0j.no

The 3Y0J Bouvet Island DXpedition was an amateur radio event that occurred from February 6 to 13, 2023. Its goals were the same as other DXpeditions: to contact as many amateur radio stations as possible from a remote location.

Bouvet Island is a 9.5-by-7-kilometre (5.9 by 4.3 mi) uninhabited volcanic island claimed and administered as a nature preserve by Norway. It is located in the Subantarctic, in the Southern Ocean. Amateur radio operators have a long history of operating in these areas. It is one of the most isolated islands in the world, being 2,500 kilometres (1,600 mi) south of South Africa; most of the island is covered by glaciers. This isolation has made the island highly sought-after by amateur radio operators who want to contact rare and exotic locations. Currently the island is the second-rarest DXCC entity, after North Korea.

The 3Y0J team spent over two years fundraising the estimated $650,000 needed to fund this DXpedition, collecting money from individuals, corporations, and amateur radio organizations around the world. The team was also awarded a number of grants, including $100,000 from the Northern California DX Foundation, $15,000 from the International DX Association, €25,000 from the German DX Foundation, and $5,000 from the American Radio Relay League.

During the activation of Bouvet Island, the team contacted over 7,000 other radio operators using multiple methods across some of the HF radio bands, including CW, SSB, and FT8. The team operated using multiple antenna systems during the activation, including vertical arrays. The activation was cut short after a team meeting citing safety concerns.

The 3Y0J team traveled to Bouvet on the sailing vessel Marama. In the first two days of operation, the team had logged 5,000 contacts. The sailing yacht, designed by Dominique Presles, was built of aluminium by the N2A shipyard in St Nazaire, under the control of Bureau Véritas. During their voyage, several team members were active on HF-bands under their own callsigns, adding "/MM" (maritime mobile).
