= FO0XB Clipperton Island DXpedition =

Amateur radio DXpedition to Clipperton Island

- Location of Clipperton Island

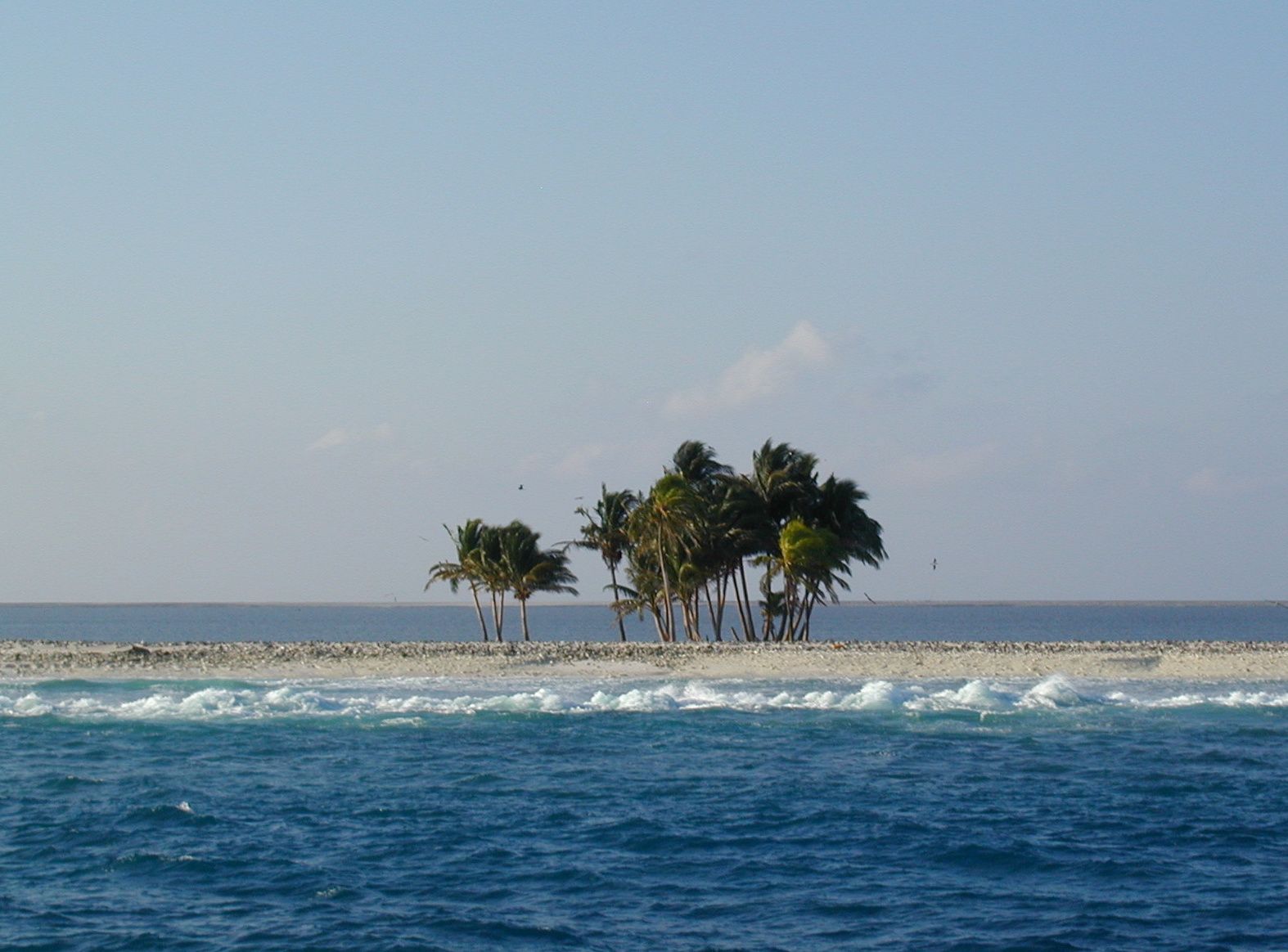
- Photo of the coast of Clipperton Island
- Dates operated: March and April 1978
- Bands operated: 70 cm, 2 m, 10 m, 15 m, 20 m, 40 m, 80 m, 160 m
- Modes used: CW, SSB
- Number of contacts: 29,069
- Number of operators: 12

The FO0XB Clipperton Island DXpedition was an amateur radio expedition that took place over two weeks in March and April 1978. The group left from San Diego on March 14, 1978, making it the first DXpedition to Clipperton Island in over 20 years. It was later followed by other DXpeditions including FO0XX (1985), FO0CI (1992), FO0AAA (2000), TX5C (2008), TX5K (2013) and TX5S (2024). The team was set up with three groups eight French members, six American members, and three Swiss members. The operators attempted to make contacts using the amateur radio satellite Oscar 7. Members of the expedition came from many walks of life including a police officer, medical doctor, teacher, horticulturist, and a judge. Contacts made with members of this expedition are mentioned by some ham radio operators as one of their more sought after and interesting contacts in their collection.
