= Clipperton Rock =

Small outcropping on Clipperton Island

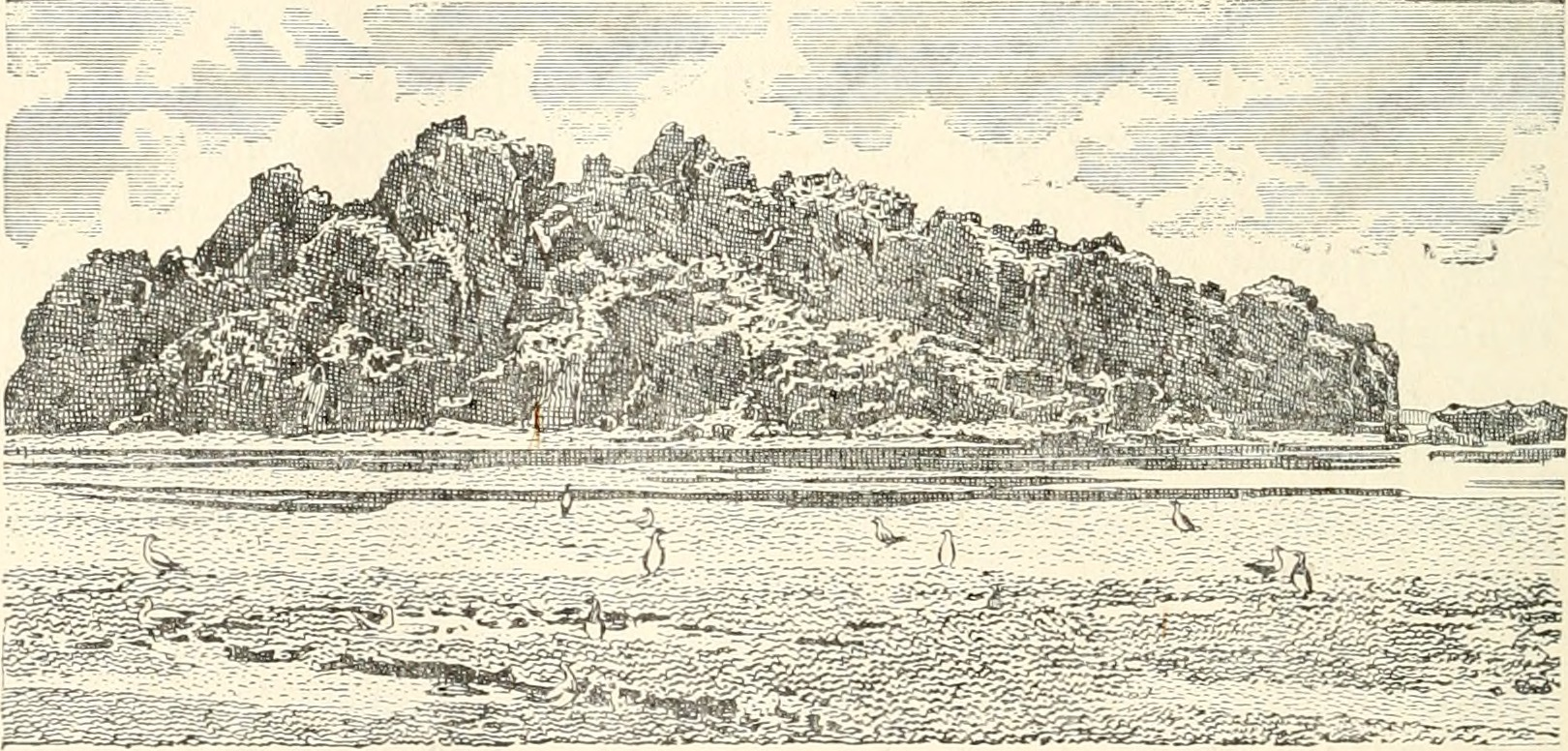

Highest point
- Elevation: 29 m (95 ft)
- Coordinates: 10.2922°N 109.2075°W

Geography
- Country: France

Clipperton Rock is the highest point on Clipperton Island at 29 metres above sea level.

== Geography ==
Clipperton Rock is located in the southeast of Clipperton Island. It constitutes the only emerged point of a chain of submarine mountains and volcanoes known as the East Pacific Rise. It is composed of trachyandesite and constitutes the last fragment of the neck of the volcano before becoming dormant.

Elongated in shape and approximately a hundred meters in length the rock has many cavities large enough to walk through. It rises to an altitude of 29 meters, almost entirely surrounded by the waters of the lagoon it is only connected to the rest of the atoll by a narrow strip of land to the east. A geodetic marker from the IGN has been affixed to the rock.
