= Clipperton Island case =

1931 arbitration between France and Mexico

Arbitral Award on the Subject of the Difference Relative to the Sovereignty over Clipperton Island
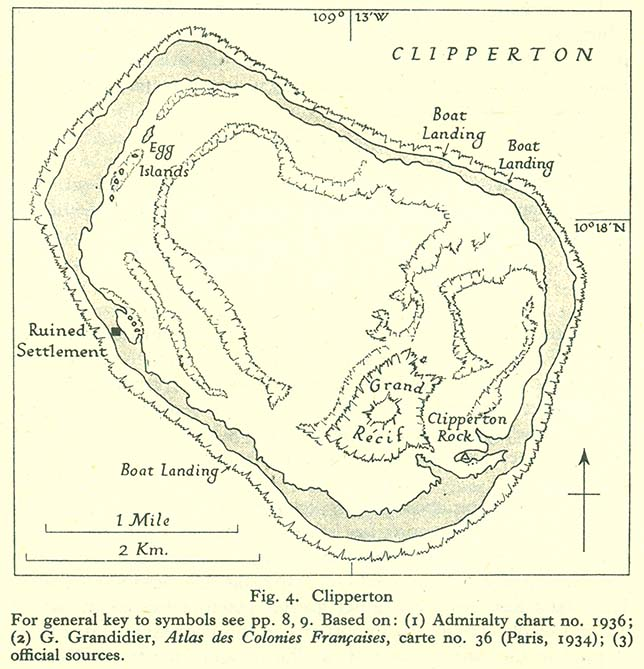
- 1930s map of Clipperton Island
- Signed: January 28, 1931
- Location: Rome, Italy
- Mediators: (Italy) Victor Emmanuel III
- Parties: France; Mexico
- Language: French; Spanish; English translation

The Clipperton Island case was an arbitration between France and Mexico over the sovereignty of Clipperton Island. The dispute was adjudicated by the King of Italy in 1931, who awarded the island to France. The case forms an important precedent in international law, particularly in matters of territorial sovereignty and the role of arbitration in resolving disputes between nations.

== Background ==
Location of Clipperton Island

Clipperton Island, an uninhabited atoll in the Pacific Ocean, became the subject of a territorial dispute between France and Mexico in the late 19th and early 20th centuries. The island gained significant attention due to its strategic location in the Pacific Ocean and the potential for guano deposits, which were used to enhance fertilizer. Initially France, Mexico, the United Kingdom and the United States all laid claims to Clipperton. Both the United Kingdom and United States dropped their claims to the island, leaving only France and Mexico.

On November 17, 1858, Lieutenant Victor Le Coat de Kervéguen on the French merchant ship L'Amiral took possession of Clipperton for France. Upon arriving in the Kingdom of Hawaii, a notice of France's annexation of Clipperton was published on November 17, 1858, in a local newspaper in Honolulu.

In 1897, a Mexican expedition raised the Mexican flag on Clipperton as a way to strengthen their claim to Clipperton. In 1905, the Mexican government established a military garrison on the island, and later erected a lighthouse under the orders of President Porfirio Díaz. By 1914, around 100 Mexican settlers had landed on the island to further establish Mexico's claim. Due to the start of the Mexican Revolution, supply ships ceased visiting the island and by 1917 many settlers had perished from scurvy. The survivors were rescued, and returned to Mexico.

== Arbitration ==
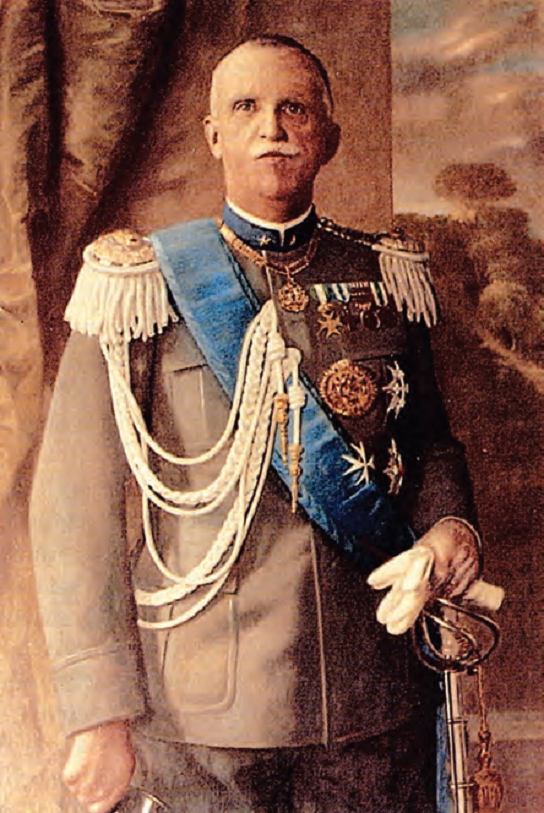
Victor Emmanuel III in 1930

On March 2, 1909, the two countries signed an agreement in Mexico to submit the dispute to arbitration, and selected King Victor Emmanuel III of Italy as arbiter. Nearly 22 years later, on January 28, 1931, Victor Emmanuel rendered his decision, awarding the island to France.

There is no reason to suppose that France has subsequently lost her right by derelictio, since she never had the animus of abandoning the island, and the fact that she has not exercised her authority there in a positive manner does not imply the forfeiture of an acquisition already definitively perfected.

— Victor Emmanuel III of Italy, Arbitral Award on the Subject of the Difference Relative to the Sovereignty over Clipperton Island

France's argument for its ownership of Clipperton was based on its 1858 claim and the formal annexation of the island and that the land was terra nullius. Additionally, France had maintained its ownership of Clipperton when other nations had claimed or landed on Clipperton. Mexico made the claim that Clipperton had been discovered by the Spanish Navy and that the papal bull of Alexander VI in 1492 had given sovereignty of the island to Spain. Following Spain's recognition of Mexico in 1836 following the Mexican War of Independence, Mexico retained all of the Spanish territory including the adjacent islands and annexed lands. Additionally, Mexico had both geographic proximity and effective occupation of the island in the early 20th century. The core legal question was which principle was more important in international law: historical claim or effective occupation.

== Impact on international law ==
An important result of the Clipperton Island case was that the first nation to discover and prove unclaimed land exists has claim to said territory. This means that the occupation of a territory is not always a requirement for making a claim on it. Nations wishing to make a claim on territory are required to exercise exclusive authority on the territory. Although the levels of exclusive authority are interrupted on a case-by-case basis, with uninhabitable areas such as Clipperton having a much lower bar than territory with a native population. France's continued claims of sovereignty over the island, even when Mexico made claims, was an important part of the arbitration going in their favor. As a further result of this ruling, nations which make claims on territory do not forfeit said territory when it is unoccupied or not actively developed.

== See also ==
- Island of Palmas Case
- Kuril Islands dispute
- Liancourt Rocks dispute
- Senkaku Islands dispute
