= Kenneth E. Stager =

American ornithologist

Kenneth E. Stager (January 28, 1915 in Uniontown, Pennsylvania – May 13, 2009 in West Los Angeles) was an American ornithologist who served as a curator at the Natural History Museum of Los Angeles County.

== Clipperton Island ==
In 1958, Stager visited Clipperton Island and saw that the breeding colonies of brown boobies and masked boobies were being devastated by feral pigs that had been introduced to the island by earlier travelers. Appalled at the depredations visited by feral pigs upon the island's brown booby and masked booby colonies (reduced to 500 and 150 birds, respectively), Stager procured a shotgun and removed all 58 pigs. By 2003, the colonies numbered 25,000 brown boobies and 112,000 masked boobies, the world's second-largest brown booby colony and largest masked booby colony.

However, according to author J. M. Skaggs, Stager's expedition arrived outside the nesting season, and apparently did not take into account the seasonal variations in seabird populations present on the island. With no personal experience or scientific measurements, they relied merely upon earlier, non-scientific accounts citing "millions of birds" and the current paucity of resident specimens to arrive at the opinion that the bird population had been devastated by the feral pigs. Without the pigs to keep them in check, land crab (Johngarthia planata) populations surged, devastating the island's vegetation.

Stager's actions served to inspire the creation of a biodiversity conservation NGO called Island Conservation, which has as a mission to prevent extinctions by removing invasive species from islands.
