= BS7H Scarborough Reef DXpedition =

Amateur radio DXpedition to Scarborough Shoal

- Location of Scarborough Shoal
- Dates operated: April 29, 2007 – May 6, 2007
- Bands operated: 10–160 m
- Modes used: CW, SSB, RTTY
- Number of contacts: 45,820
- Number of operators: 4

The BS7H Scarborough Reef DXpedition was an amateur radio expedition to Scarborough Reef that took place from April 29, 2007 to May 6, 2007. It was cut short at the request of the Chinese government. The trip to the reef was authorized by the Chinese Ministry of Foreign Affairs and the State Sports Commission.

The team of 17 people came from 7 different countries. They worked in 8-hour shifts manning the radio stations, and would return to their vessel to recover and rest. To operate the team, had to build four wooden structures on the rocks that would prevent them from being overtaken during high tide.

At the time of the event, Scarborough Reef was one the rarest locations for radio operators to contact and was a notable highlight for many operators who were able to make contact.
