= Christian Jost (geographer) =

French geographer

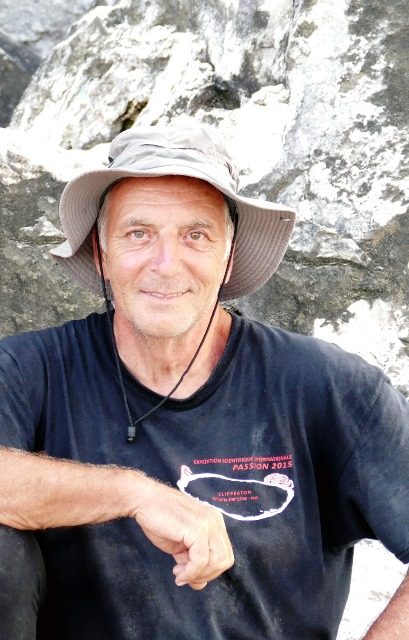
Jost in 2015

Christian H. Jost is a French geographer.

Christian (Henri) Jost is Professor Emeritus at University de Lorraine (France) and Emeritus Researcher at the Center for Insular Research and Observatory of the Environment (CRIOBE) one of France's leading laboratories for the study of coral ecosystems. He was Professor of Geography and Development at the University of French Polynesia from 2011 to 2018 (UPF) in Tahiti (Fr).

== Background ==
After thirteen years in various position and universities in Africa (Zaïre, Rwanda, Cameroon, Togo) and two years on development projects in India (Andhra-Pradesh and Gujarat), he went as Senior Lecturer at the University of New Caledonia where he opened the first diploma in Geography (BSc) and also spent a year as visiting fellow at the University of Sydney. He then moved to the University of Lorraine – Metz where he was Director of the Geographical Research Center (CEGUM EA 1105) from 2006 to 2011, then joined the University of French Polynesia, where he is Dean of the Faculty of Human Sciences, Languages and Literature. He is Researcher with PRODIG UMR 8586 Research unit of CNRS Paris Sorbonne 1, IV, Paris 7 universities and IRD.

== Contributions ==
His research domains are - Systems of constraints and challenges of development and environmental management in the Global South - Eco-geosystemic evolution, coastal dynamics, geopolitics and valorization of the territory of La Passion - Clipperton - Water and Risks - Island Geosystems - Sociocultural and Ecosystem Values and Indicators of Landscapes as Decision Support.

The author of over 150 scientific papers on various subjects, Jost is particularly associated with Clipperton Island on which he has worked for over twenty years (with 5 expeditions). Surveys he made there in 1997 and 2001 (confirmed in 2005) established that Clipperton is the largest colony of masked boobies in the world, with 110,000 individuals at that time. Jost was a member of SURPACLIPP, Viviane Solis-Weiss's 1997 Franco—Mexican oceanographic expedition to Clipperton (a joint venture of the National Autonomous University of Mexico and the University of New Caledonia), then he led the 2001 follow-up expedition PASSION 2001, which provided updated data on the geography, environment, water resources and management constraints of the atoll. In 2013 he also went completing data to Clipperton island dropped on the island by the French Navy and brought back to Mexican coast 10 days later with Cordell Radioam Expedition . In April 2015 he organized the international scientific expedition PASSION 2015 with the assistance of the French Navy and French Army and brought fourteen scientists from France, France Overseas territories and Mexico to study reef biota, coastal dynamics, and inventory of flora, waste and fauna, etc. This was followed in October by an Important Colloquium he co-organized with French Deputy Deputy Philippe Folliot and CPOM ONG at the French Assemblée Nationale (Parliament).

He has been widely invited to give Conferences, Master or Doctorate seminars, or participate in international workshops and conferences (Québec Mac Gill, Laval universities, several years; Rio de Janeiro, UFF, 2011 as co-organizer of the first world Congress on Risks and civil security, invited by the Charles Darwin Foundation, Galapagos at the international Workshop on sustainable development of islands facing Tourism; invited by Tioumen State University, Siberia, Russia, 2010 for an International Workshop on sustainable development; Agadir and Fès, Marocco, from 2008 annually for Conferences and Master courses and student field tour; Cuba, Uni. La Havanna, 2007, 2008; Hawaii, Manoa Uni. & EWC; Mexico, UNAM; Sydney, Uni. Sydney, UNSW; Suva, USP, Fiji islands; Port-Vila, Vanuatu, etc.).

Jost has also researched and written on other aspects of geography and ecology of the Pacific Ocean, and has worked, studied, and traveled extensively in Africa and Asia.

== Works ==
=== Books ===
- Christian Jost and Philippe Folliot, 2018. La Passion - Clipperton. L'île sacrifiée. Ed. La Bibliotèca / CPOM, 200 pages
- Christian Jost, ed. (1998). The French-Speaking Pacific: Population, Environment and Development Issues. Boombana. ISBN 1876542020.(in English)

=== Articles, presentations, and scientific papers ===
Partial list

- Jost Xénia, Christian H. Jost, Jean-Yves Meyer, 2019. Flora and vegetation of Clipperton (or La Passion) atoll, Northeastern Pacific Ocean: three centuries of changes and recent plant dynamics. Atoll Research Bulletin. Published 2019-06-06 by Smithsonian Institution Scholarly Press, Washington, D.C. 20013-7012 (ISSN: 0077-5630) (en ligne https://opensi.si.edu/index.php/smithsonian/catalog/book/204), 35 pages.
- Clua E., Bessudo S., Caselle J., Chauvet C., Jost C.H., Friedlander A., 2019. Population assessment of the endemic angelfish Holacanthus limbaughi from Île de La Passion-Clipperton Atoll (Tropical Eastern Pacific), Endangered Species Research DOI: https://doi.org/10.3354/esr00947, 38:171-176
- Friedlander AM, Giddens J, Ballesteros E, Blum S, Brown EK, Caselle JE, Henning B, Jost C.H., Salinas-de-León P, Sala E. 2019. Marine biodiversity from zero to a thousand meters at Clipperton Atoll (Île de La Passion), Tropical Eastern Pacific. PeerJ 7:e7279 https://doi.org/10.7717/peerj.7279
- Jost C. H., 2018. Aux confins du Pacifique oriental, le territoire de La Passion - Clipperton, Un « Finismer » Asiatique ? French Academic Network for Asian Studies (GIS Asie),
- Jost C.H., 2017. La Passion – Clipperton : l’île de toutes les passions et convoitises, in Regnault J.-M. & Al Wardi S., L’Océanie convoitée. CNRS Editions Paris, chap. 1
- Jost C.H., yearly since 1997. Vanuatu et Wallis et Futuna, in http://www.agora-francophone.org/, Editions CIDEF-AFI, Québec.
- Tarrats M. & Jost C., 2016. Isolement et enclavement géographiques des îles Marquises, sources de contraintes et d’originalités. In Galzin R., Duron S.-D. & Meyer J.-Y. (eds), Biodiversité terrestre et marine des îles Marquises, Polynésie française. Société française d’Ichtyologie, Paris: 13–40.
- Bambridge T., Jost C., 2016. Interférences entre l’exploration/exploitation minière sous-marine et les autres activités, Chap. IV-3, in Le Meur P.-Y., Cochonat P., David C., Geronimi V., Samadi S. (coord.), 2016 – Les ressources minérales profondes en Polynésie française. Marseille, IRD Éditions, coll. Expertise collégiale, bilingue français-anglais + tahitien, 288 p.
- Jost C. (éd.), 2013. Gestion du risque et sécurité civile: résilience, adaptation, stratégies. Revue Géographique de l'Est, vol. 53 / 1-2
- Jost C., 2010. Contraintes et enjeux de développement de la Nouvelle-Calédonie, ECHOGEOFull text, 11, DOI : 10.4000/echogeo.11612
- Jost, C.H.; Andrefouet, S. (2006). "Long term natural and human perturbations and current status of Clipperton Atoll, a remote island of the Eastern Pacific" (PDF). Pacific Conservation Biology. 12 (3). Surrey Beatty & Sons Pty Ltd: 207–218. doi:10.1071/PC060207.(in English)
- Jost, C.H. (July 2005). "Risques environnementaux et enjeux à Clipperton (Pacifique français)" [Environmental risks and challenges to Clipperton (French Pacific)]. Cybergéo. doi:10.4000/cybergeo.3552.(in French)
- Jost, C.H. (June–December 2005). "Bibliographie de l'île de Clipperton, île de La Passion (1711–2005)" [Bibliography of Clipperton Island, Passion Island (1711–2005)] (PDF). Journal de la Société des Océanistes (120–121): 181–197. doi:10.4000/jso.481.(in French)
- Lebigre, Jean-Michel; Decoudras, Pierre-Marie, eds. (2003). "Jost C.H., 2003. Clipperton - Île de la Passion : Une aire française du Pacifique à protéger!" [Clipperton Island - Passion Island: A French Pacific area to protect! in]. Les aires protégées insulaires et tropicales [Tropical Islands and Protected Areas] (PDF). Presses Universitaires de Bordeaux. ISBN 9782905081452. (given at the Symposium Aires protégées insulaires et littorales tropicales [Protected Islands and Coastal Tropical Areas], Nouméa (New Caledonia), 30 and 31 October October 2001)(in French)
- Jost, Christian; Lille, Didier. "A Decision Support System for Water Resource Management in Lifou Island, New-Caledonia" (PDF). 10th Australasian Remote Sensing and Photogrammetry Conference. Archived from the original (PDF) on 25 May 2010.(in English)
- Jost C., 2001, Système de support à la décision pour une gestion concertée de l’eau. Une approche intégrée du comportement social et des risques aux Iles Loyauté (Nouvelle-Calédonie). Revue Internationale de Géomatique, N° Spécial SIG et développement du territoire, Vol. 11, n°3-4, p. 135–160.

=== Films ===
- Jost, Christian (2004). Clipperton - Ile de La Passion [Clipperton - Passion Island] (video). Paris: Editions CDPNC Noumea/SCEREN.(in French)

=== Films - participation ===
- THALASSA Reportage "Clipperton, une Île au centre du monde." 2017. France 3 Television Channel Magazine. Film about Cordell TX5K Clipperton Expedition organized by Robert Schmieder and Expedition PASSION directed by Christian Jost.
- National Geographic - Pristine Seas "Clipperton - Ile de la Passion 2016 or watch it on the page of Clipperton Program UPF
