= Raymond Fenard =

French Admiral

Raymond Albert Fenard
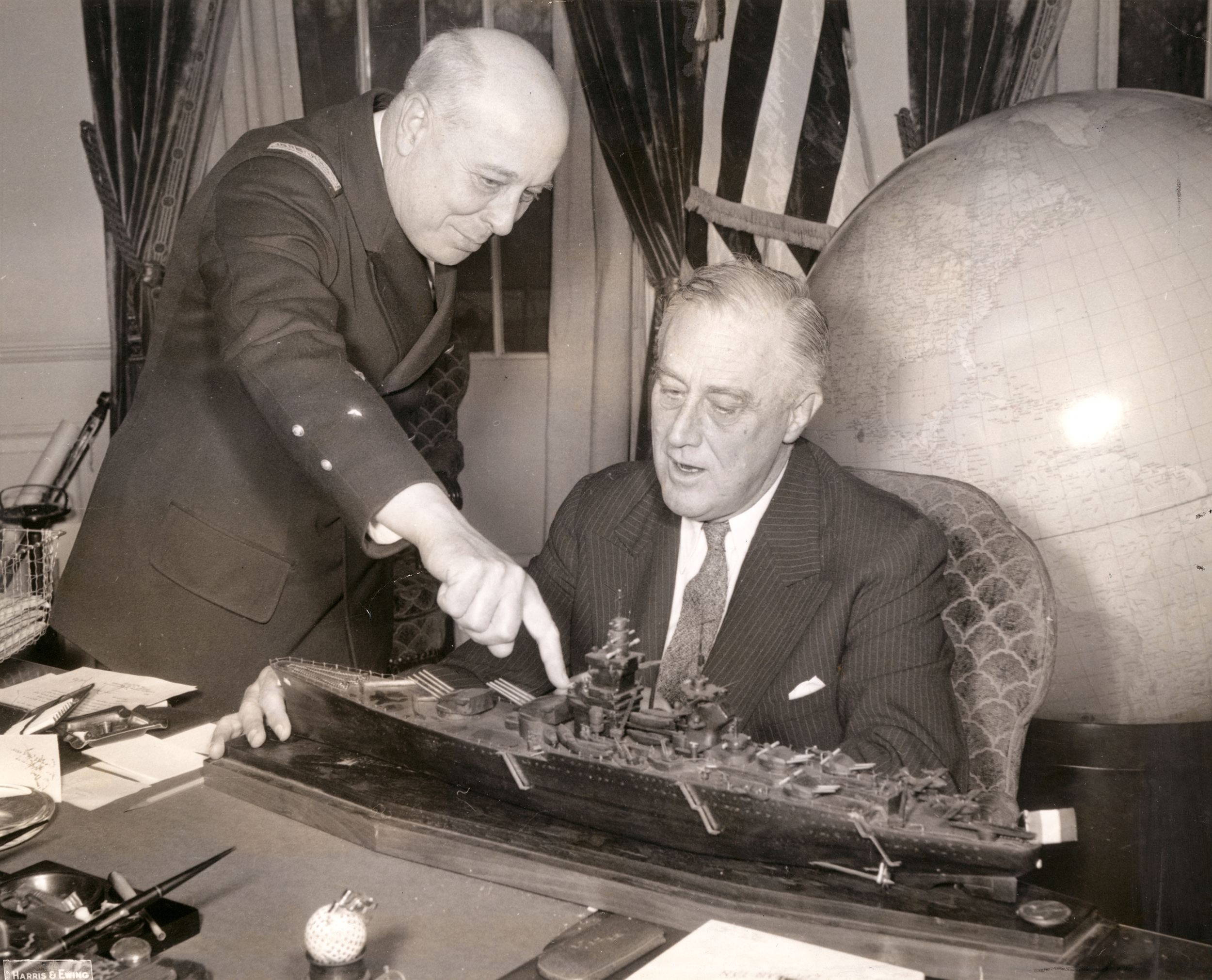
- Raymand Fenard (left) and U.S. President Franklin D. Roosevelt, 1943
- Born: January 7, 1887; Yonne, France
- Died: March 8, 1957 (aged 70); Berne, Switzerland
- Military career
- Allegiance: France
- Branch: French Navy
- Service years: 1905-
- Rank: Vice Admiral
- Conflicts: World War I World War II
- Awards: Legion of Honor; Legion of Merit

Raymond Albert Fenard was a French admiral and veteran of World War I and World War II.

== Career ==
During World War II, Fenard served as the chief of the French naval mission in the United States. In this role he was able to negotiate the rearmament and modernization of the French navy with the assistance of the United States. During the North Africa campaign Fenard helped negotiate the surrender of Vichy French forces to the Allies. Fenard achieved this by informing François Darlan that his son was ill and that he was needed in Algiers, once he arrived he was pressured to give the order to surrender.
