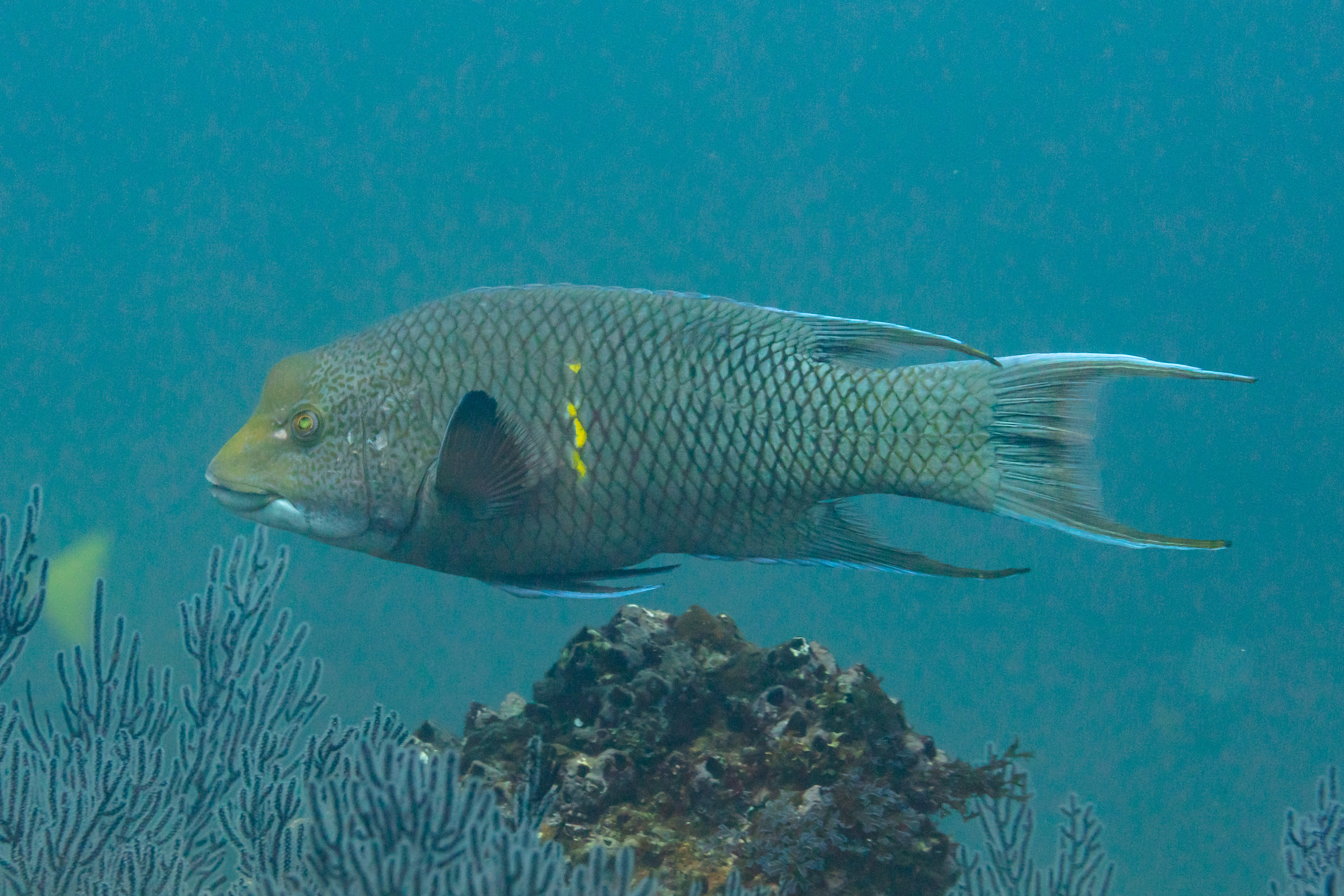
- Male
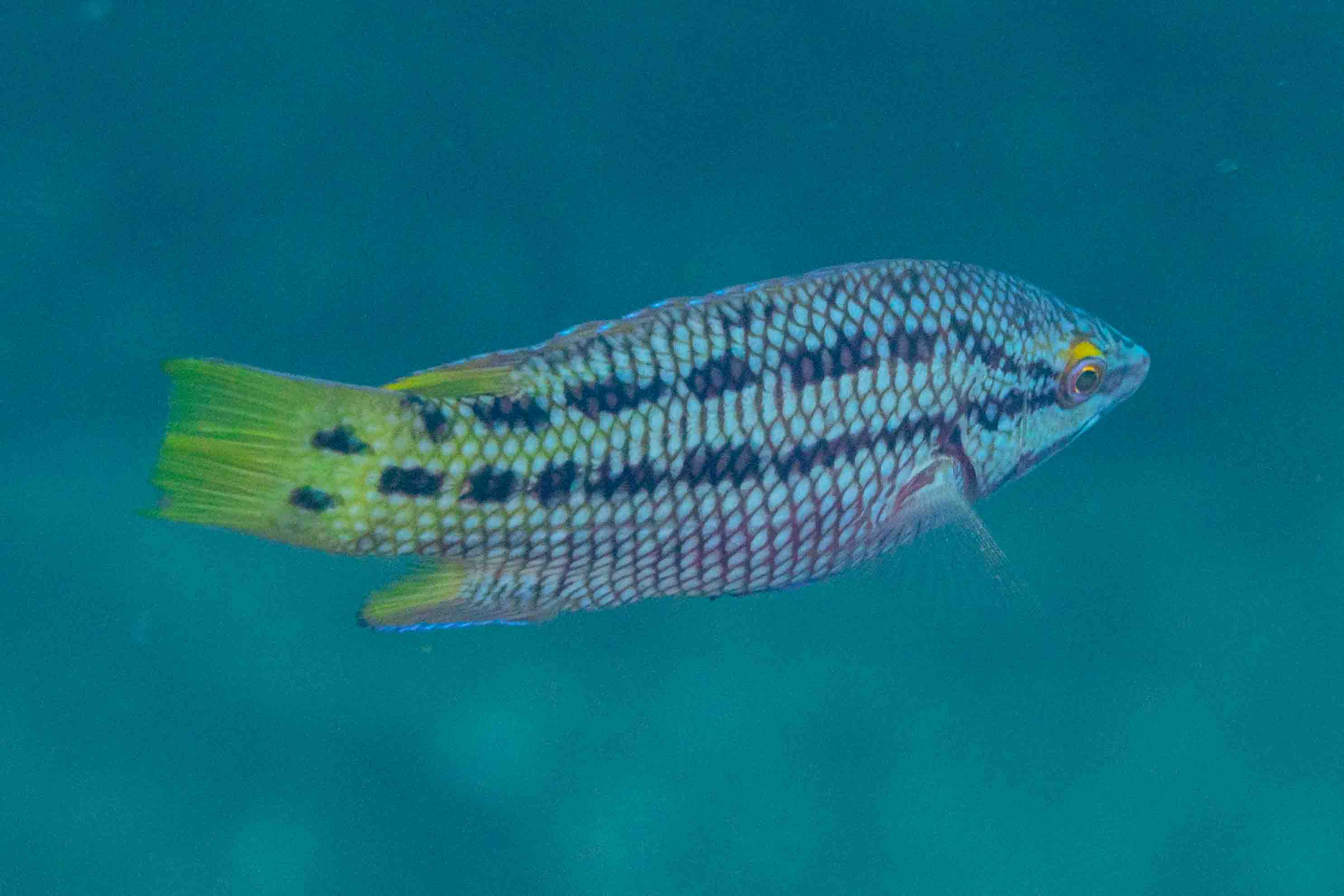
- Female

Conservation status
- Least Concern (IUCN 3.1)

Scientific classification
- Kingdom: Animalia
- Phylum: Chordata
- Class: Actinopterygii
- Order: Labriformes
- Family: Labridae
- Genus: Bodianus
- Species: B. diplotaenia

Binomial name
- Bodianus diplotaenia (T. N. Gill, 1862)

Synonyms
- Harpe diplotaenia T. N. Gill, 1862; Harpe pectoralis T. N. Gill, 1862

= Mexican hogfish =

Species of fish

The Mexican hogfish, Bodianus diplotaenia, is a species of wrasse native to the eastern Pacific Ocean. Adults inhabit rocky or coral areas at depths of 5–75 m. Sometimes, they are also found on sandy bottoms and where marine plants abound. They are solitary or form aggregations of only a few individuals. Mexican hogfish feed on crabs, brittle stars, mollusks, and sea urchins. At night, they gather in cracks and crevices of rocks and caves to sleep. The Mexican hogfish starts life as a female, and later becomes a functional male. Males defend temporary reproductive territories called leks. The sex change may be due to local social conditions, but it may also have a genetic component, since the reversal occurs over a limited size range. They are oviparous, with distinct pairing during breeding.

== Description ==
The body of the Mexican hogfish is robust and compressed. Large males have a pronounced hump between their eyes. The snout is pointed. They have a canine tooth at the rear of top jaw, and two pairs of strong canines at front of the top and bottom jaws. They have 10 dorsal fins and 12 anal fins. Adult males have long filaments on their tail fin lobes and prolonged rays posteriorly on the dorsal and anal fins. They have 17 pectoral rays. The lateral line is unbroken and smoothly arched. They have 31 large scales with pores on the lateral line. The maximum size is up to 76 cm, the common size is up to 35 cm.

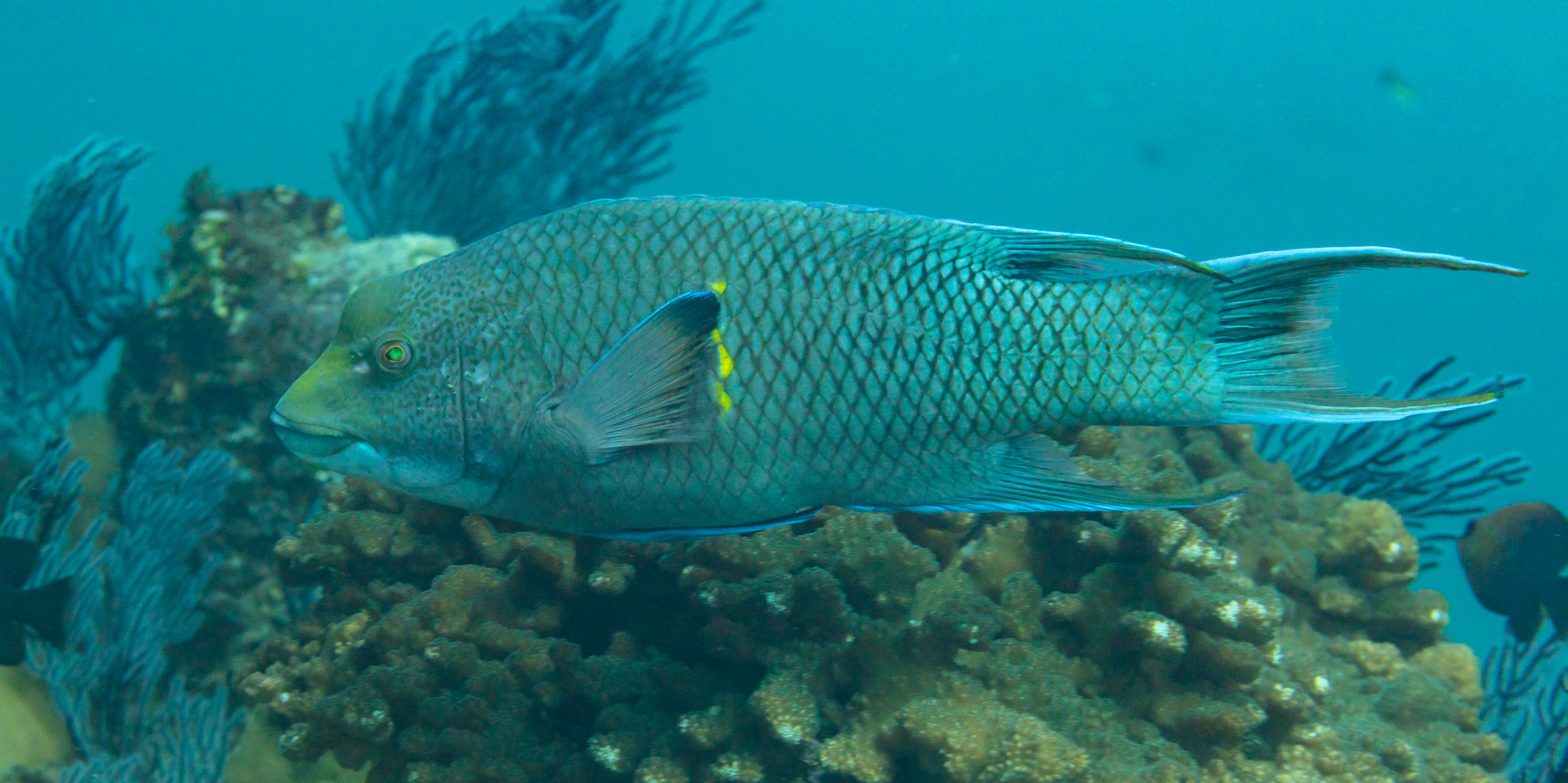
A Mexican hogfish near Los Cabos, Mexico

In the initial phase, Mexican hogfish are reddish, grading to yellow on the posterior part of the body and the caudal fin. They have a pair of blackish stripes (may be broken) on the upper half of the side. Individual scale margins are brown to reddish. In the terminal phase, they are bluish green with a brown head (except for a white lower jaw) and a narrow yellowish bar on the middle of the side. Juveniles are similar to initial phase but with a yellow base color.

== Distribution ==
They are found in the eastern Pacific: Guadalupe Island and throughout the Gulf of California to Chile, including the Cocos, Malpelo, Revillagigedo and the Galapagos islands.
