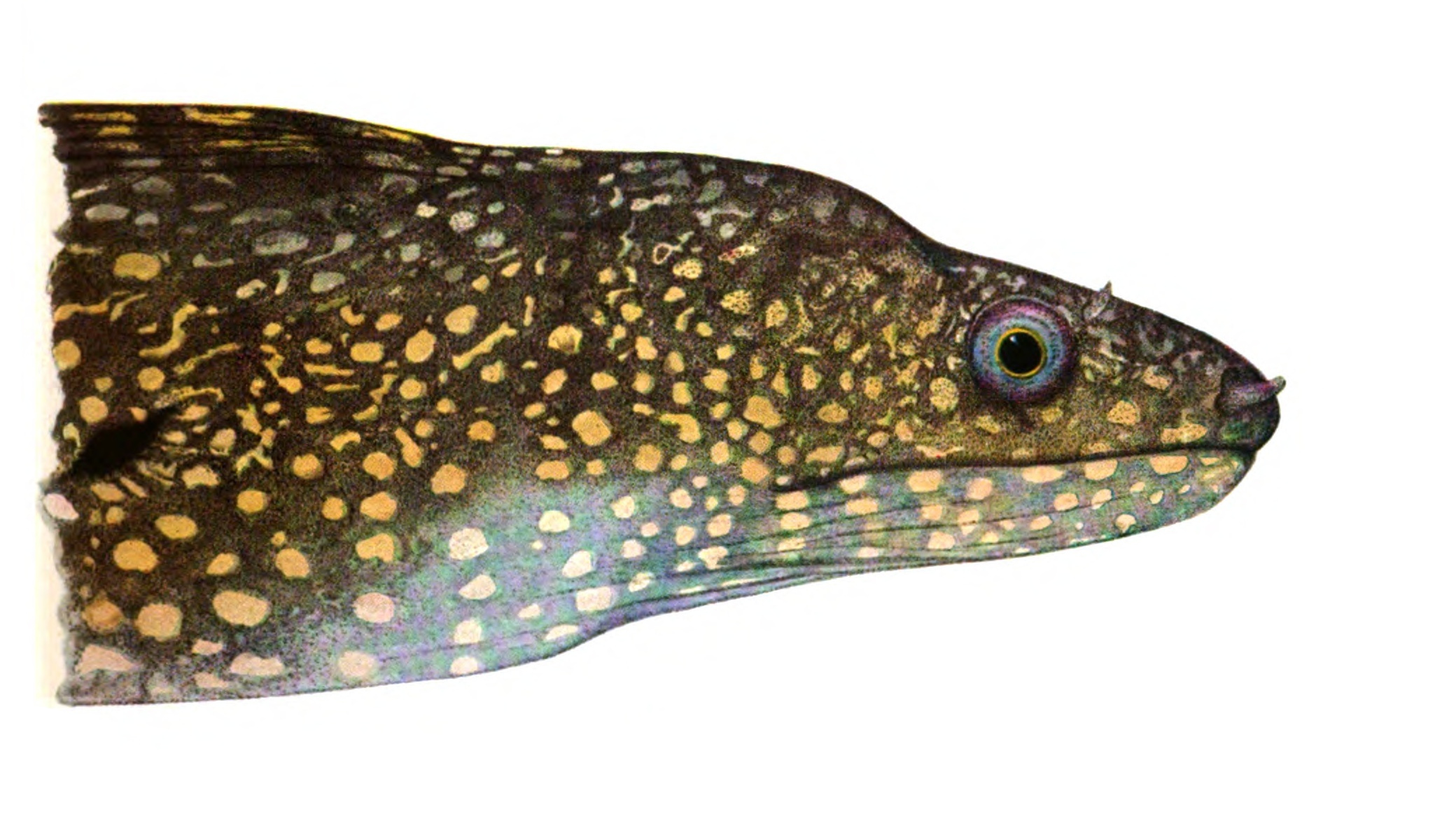

Conservation status
- Least Concern (IUCN 3.1)

Scientific classification
- Kingdom: Animalia
- Phylum: Chordata
- Class: Actinopterygii
- Order: Anguilliformes
- Family: Muraenidae
- Genus: Gymnothorax
- Species: G. dovii

Binomial name
- Gymnothorax dovii (Günther, 1870)

= Speckled moray eel =

Species of fish

The speckled moray eel (Gymnothorax dovii) is a moray eel found in the eastern Pacific Ocean, around the Galapagos Islands and along the Central American coast from Costa Rica to Colombia. It is also found in the Gulf of California. It reaches a length of about 170 cm.

== Etymology ==
The fish is named in honor of John Melmoth Dow (1827-1892) of the Panama Railroad Company, was a ship captain and an amateur naturalist, who presented the type specimen to the British Museum.
