= Lehel (company) =

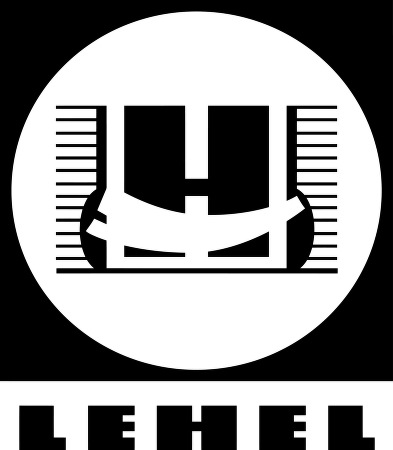
- Company type: Ltd.
- Industry: Engineering
- Founded: 1945–1989
- Headquarters: Hungary
- Products: Refrigerators
- Parent: Electrolux Lehel Hűtőgépgyár Kft.

Lehel is the name of the largest Hungarian appliance company. The company was owned by the state during the socialist era (1945–1989), and was mostly known for its refrigerators, which were in widespread use. After two years of negotiations, the company was acquired by Electrolux for US$83 million in 1991. At the time of the acquisition, Lehel had about 5,000 employees and was considered one of the best functioning companies in Hungary.
