= DX-pedition =

Amateur radio "expedition"

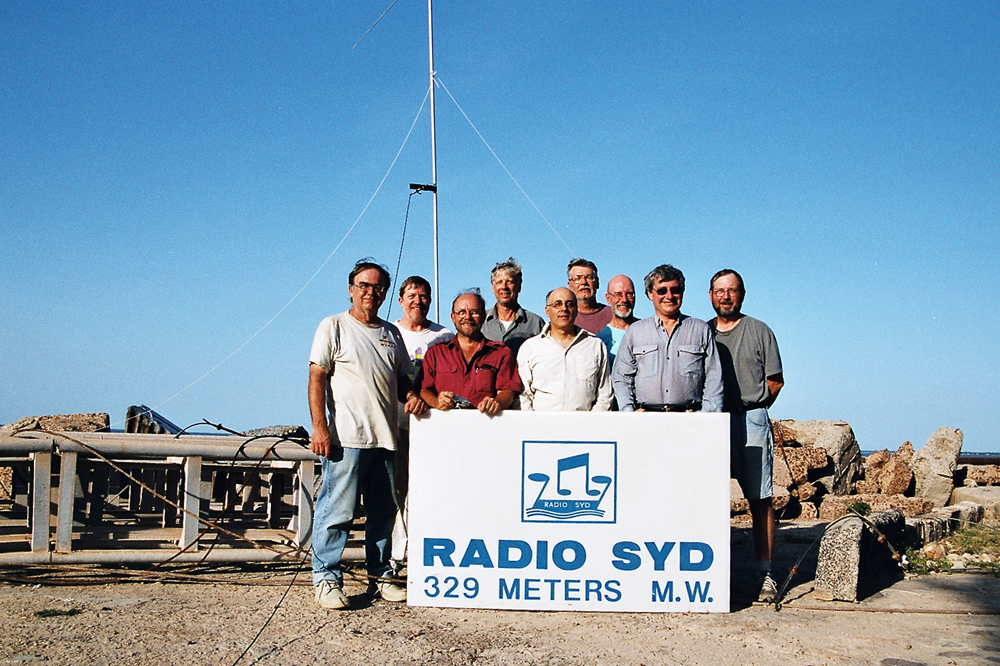
A group of amateur radio operators during DX-pedition to The Gambia in October 2003

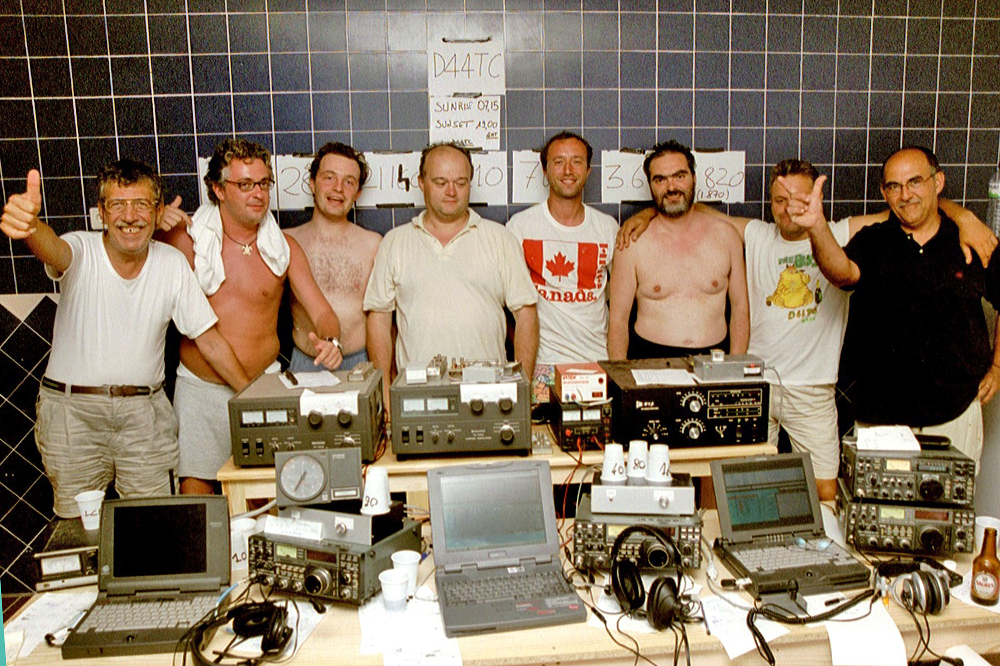
Amateur radio expedition to Cape Verde in October 2001.

A DX-pedition is an expedition to what is considered an exotic place by amateur radio operators and DX listeners, typically because of its remoteness, access restrictions, or simply because there are very few radio amateurs active from that place. This could be an island, a country, or even a particular spot on a geographical grid. DX is a telegraphic shorthand for "distance" or "distant" (see DXing).

== History ==
Early DX-peditions were simply exploratory and geographical expeditions in the late 1920s and 1930s, in which one or more radio amateurs participated to provide long-distance communications. At the same time they communicated with fellow radio amateurs who wanted to contact a new country. Most notable are the Antarctic expeditions of Admiral Byrd. Another example is the voyage of the schooner Kaimiloa, which traveled the South Pacific in 1924. While the ship's wealthy owners enjoyed the islands, an amateur radio operator kept contact with, and sent QSL cards to, experimenters in the United States.

The participation of radio amateurs in geographical expeditions was resumed after World War II, e.g. the participation of Bill Snyder, W0LHS, and Bob Leo, W6PBV, in the Gatti-Hallicrafters expedition in Africa of 1948. The most unusual expedition to place reliance on amateur radio for communications was that of Kon-Tiki organized by Thor Heyerdahl in 1947 and using call sign LI2B.

The activity of dedicated DX-peditions was pioneered by one-time ARRL president Robert W. Denniston, W0DX. Mr. Denniston's 1948 DX-pedition, using call sign VP7NG, was to the Bahamas and was called "Gon-Waki" à la Thor Heyerdahl's Kon-Tiki expedition the previous year.

== DX-peditions and awards ==
DX-peditions are planned and organized to help operators who need to contact that area to obtain an amateur radio award. There are several awards sponsored by various organizations based on contacting many countries. Perhaps the most famous of these is the DX Century Club (DXCC) award sponsored by the ARRL. The base level of this award involves contacting and confirming 100 distinct geographical entities defined by the ARRL – usually politically distinct countries, and sometimes well-separated administrative or geographical regions within them, such as outlying islands.

There are currently 340 separate entities recognized for award purposes. An "entity" for such purposes is any location that is either politically separate or physically remote (or both) from other jurisdictions / locations. For example:

- Even though Alaska and Hawaii are political units of the United States, they are separate DX entities (physically separate regions).
- Small independent countries, even ones embedded within larger ones, such as the Vatican and Monaco, count.
- Other entities include transnational organizations such as the International Telecommunication Union, and the United Nations. These are within their host countries but have distinct ITU prefixes.
- Finally, a few areas of historic or special status have been included, such as Sardinia, the Sovereign Military Order of Malta, Antarctica, and Western Sahara.

While the ARRL criteria for new entities were rationalized in 1999, those entities introduced before that date under relatively lax rules remain on the list, so long as they satisfy the original criteria.

Other DX-peditions focus on operation from islands with little or no local radio amateur activity, for the Islands on the Air (IOTA) award which is sponsored by the Radio Society of Great Britain. A small number of DX-peditions focus on activating specific, remote Maidenhead locator squares for the benefit of VHF and UHF operators.

== Locations ==
Many DX-peditions take place from locations with adequate access to power and supplies, often where the country has a small resident amateur population or where licensing is not very difficult. Many Caribbean and Pacific island nations, as well as European micro-states, have very small populations, but have hotels, reliable power, and supplies, and are easy to gain operating permission in. Therefore, these states are regularly activated by amateurs, often in combination with a family holiday.

Other jurisdictions take a more stringent view of individual access to communications equipment, and are rare because very few amateurs are licensed in those countries and visitors find it difficult or impossible to gain operating permits or import amateur radio equipment. Examples include North Korea, Mount Athos and Yemen.

Some locations are also rare due to their extreme inaccessibility—examples include Peter I Island, Campbell Island, Clipperton Island, Navassa Island, or Desecheo Island. When amateurs travel to remote locations such as these they must first obtain permission to operate from that location from whatever political jurisdiction rules the area they wish to travel to. Even in countries such as the United States, this permission can be difficult and costly to obtain. For example, a recent DXpedition to Jarvis Island in August 2024 required a permit from the U.S. Fish and Wildlife Service for access to and use of Jarvis Island National Wildlife Refuge, which cost the team $27,000.

Once operating permission is assured, then transportation must be arranged. This can be both expensive and dangerous. Some locations are coral atolls that are almost submerged at high tide, such as Scarborough Reef; others are sub-polar islands with inhospitable climates such as Peter I Island. The amateur must also take care of the basic necessities such as food, water, and power.

== Equipment and operation ==
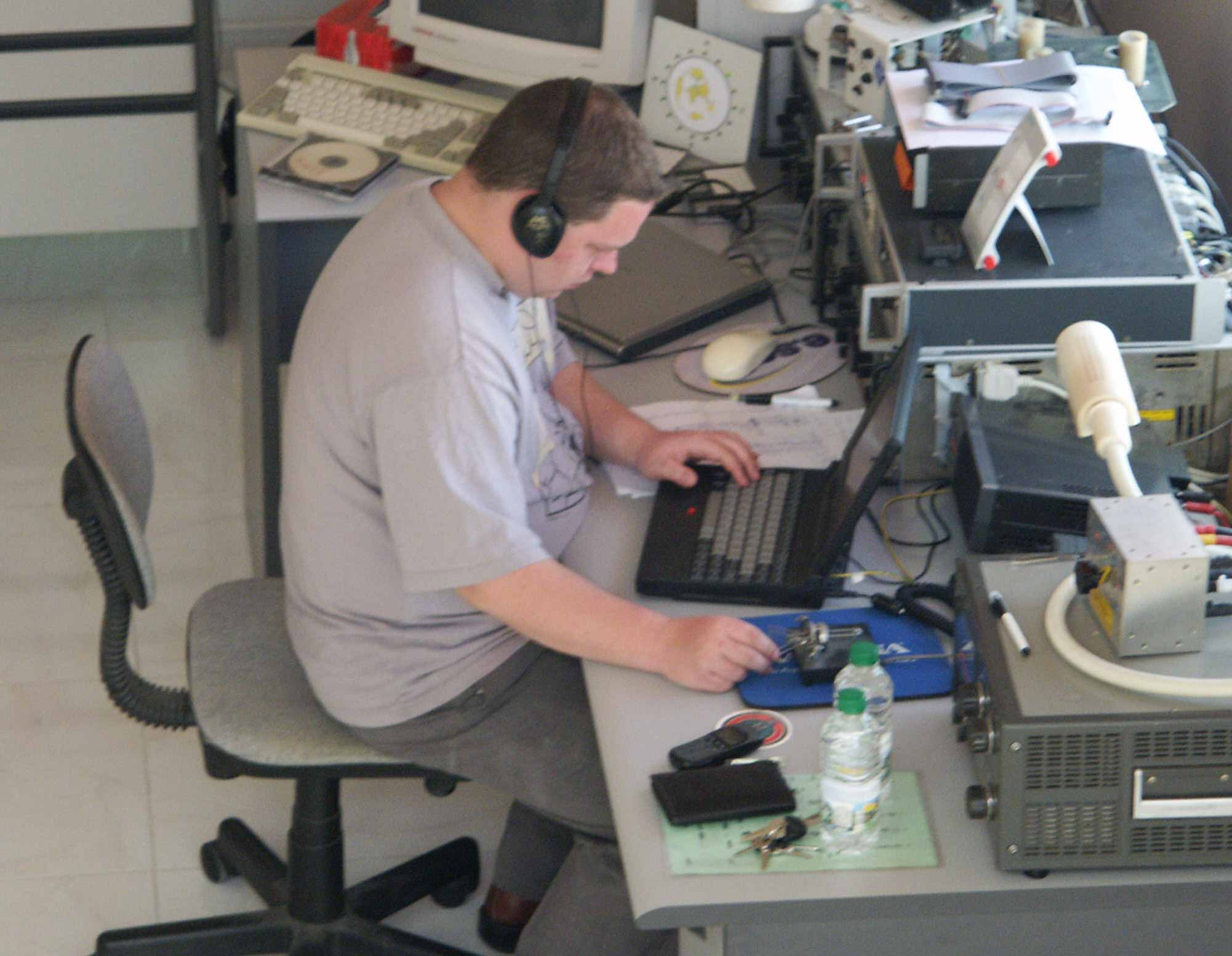
A DXer operates during a holiday DXpedition to Muscat, Oman.

In addition to licensing and survival issues, DX-pedition participants devote much attention to the radio equipment they use.

In an extremely rare location for a popular awards program like DXCC, hundreds of stations may be calling the DX-pedition at any one time (known as a 'pile-up'). Therefore, DX-peditioners will aim to use high power and gain antennas on as many bands as practical, to achieve a loud signal worldwide and keep control of the inevitable pileups that occur. Operators may also receive and transmit on different frequencies, called split operation, to be heard by distant stations without interference to their signal from the pile-up. This can also help the operation to make a substantial number of contacts with parts of the planet that have unfavourable propagation from the area visited, lying perhaps in the region on the Earth's surface which is diametrically opposite to it—its antipodal point. Examples would be the Central Pacific from Europe, or the Caribbean from Japan.

For smaller operations to remote locations, smaller radios which run off of a 12 V DC power supply and antenna systems which are more easily transported are favored over larger and more difficult to transport equipment. However, generators are usually used because of the power requirements for amplifiers and the ease of refueling versus recharging a battery.

When the individual or group arrives at the DX-pedition destination, they must set up their station and get on the air. DX-peditions are usually group affairs since the desire is to make as many contacts as possible from the location. Round-the-clock operations on multiple HF bands simultaneously are typical, which necessitates a group activity. The use of the Internet to upload logs (allowing quick confirmation of questionable contacts) and for QSLs (formal confirmation) has made the process somewhat easier.

Holiday operations from locations where there are few resident operators are often more leisurely affairs. Nonetheless, the operator will seek to make as many contacts as possible in the operating time available, with the result that contacts are often extremely brief, limited just to an exchange of signal reports.

== Contests ==
Many DX-peditions are organized around various radio contests that happen throughout the year. This is often done so that the DX-pedition station can gain an advantage in contests and maximize the number of contacts that they make during the DX-pedition, since the radio bands are the most active during contests.

== DX-peditions with most contacts ==
- In October 2011, the T32C Kiritimati (Christmas Island, eastern Kiribati) DXpedition, run by the Five Star DXers Association, claimed 213,169 contacts.
- This broke the February 2008 record set by the Ducie Island (eastern Pitcairn group) DXpedition, which claimed 183,686 QSOs under the callsign VP6DX.
- This in turn had broken the previous record of 168,000 contacts set in 2001 by D68C (also by the FSDXA) from the Galawa Beach Hotel on the Comoros island of Grande Comore.
- The January 2012 trip to Malpelo Island had 195,625 contacts. While not an absolute record, it was the largest total ever achieved by a DX-pedition where the members lived in tents and powered their radios by portable generators.

== List of notable DX-peditions ==
- 2016 – VKØEK – Cordell Expeditions to Heard Island. Combination radio / science expedition. See "special issue". DX Magazine. January–February 2017.
- 2015 – K1N – KP1-5 project Expedition to Navassa Island, the #1 most-wanted DXCC entity on ClubLog and the DX Magazine survey.
- 2014 – FT5ZM – DX-pedition to Amsterdam Island
- 2013 – TX5K – Cordell Expeditions 2013 to Clipperton Island, more than 113,000 QSOs, 47 EME contacts.
- 2012 – ZL9HR – Hellenic Amateur Radio Association of Australia 2012 to Campbell Island, New Zealand
- 1983 - DX-pedition to Amboyna Cay in the disputed Spratly Islands was fired on by Vietnamese forces, resulting in the death of two hams.

== See also ==
- List of DXpeditions
