= Palmyra Atoll =

US territory in the North Pacific Ocean

Palmyra Atoll Palmyra Island
- Incorporated Territory and Minor Outlying Island
- Palmyra Atoll Territory
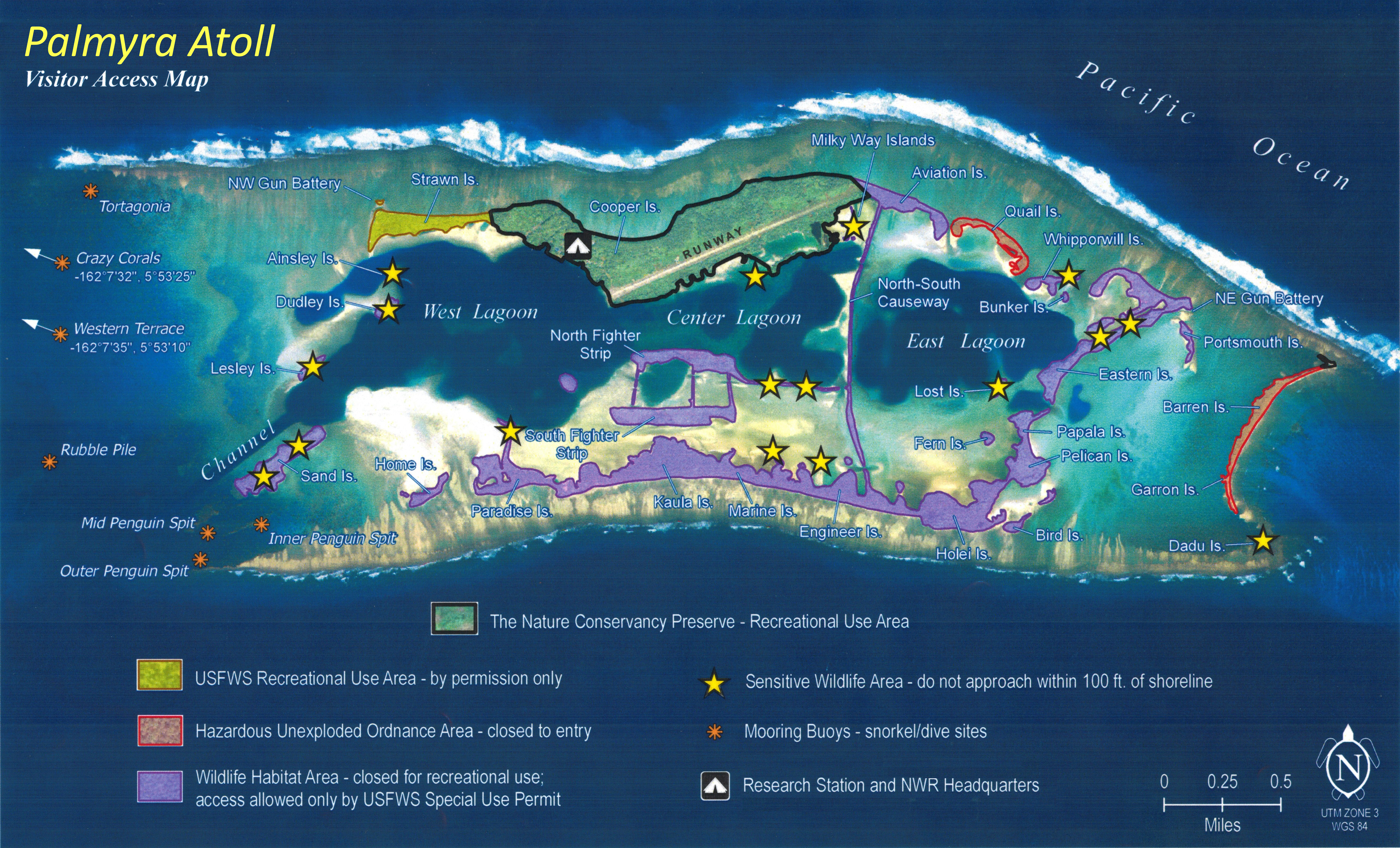
- Palmyra Atoll visitor access map

- Location of Palmyra Atoll in the Pacific Ocean
- Sovereign state: United States
- Annexed by the United States: June 14, 1900
- Named after: U.S. trading ship Palmyra
- Government: National Wildlife Refuge of the United States Department of the Interior
  - President: Donald Trump (R)
  - Administrators: John Klavitter (USFWS) & Angel Demapan (OIA)

Area
  - Total: 11.9 km^{2} (4.6 sq mi)
  - Land: 11.9 km^{2} (4.6 sq mi)

Dimensions
  - Length: 4.7 km (2.9 mi)
  - Width: 6.8 km (4.2 mi)
- Elevation: 2.1 m (6.9 ft)
- Highest elevation (Sand Island): 10 m (33 ft)
- Lowest elevation (Pacific Ocean): 0 m (0 ft)

Population
  - 2019 estimate: 4–20 staff and scientists
- Currency: United States dollar (USD) (USD)
- Time zone: UTC−10:00 (Hawaii–Aleutian Time Zone)
- ISO 3166 code: US-UM; UM-95
- Internet TLD: .us
- IUCN category Ia (strict nature reserve)
- Designated: 2001

Ramsar Wetland
- Official name: Palmyra Atoll National Wildlife Refuge
- Designated: April 1, 2011
- Reference no.: 1971

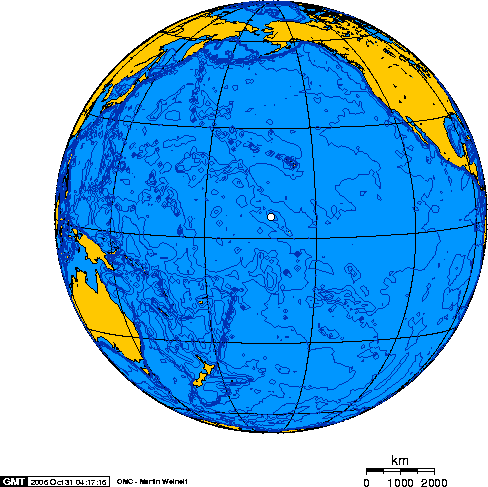
Orthographic projection over Palmyra Atoll

Palmyra Atoll (/pælˈmaɪrə/; formally the Palmyra Atoll Territory), or Palmyra Island, is a small, low-lying, uninhabited atoll in the central Pacific Ocean that is a Territory of the United States and insular area; it is the only officially incorporated territory in the Union. It is one of the Northern Line Islands (southeast of Kingman Reef and north of Kiribati), and is located almost due south of the Hawaiian Islands, roughly one-third of the way between Hawaii and American Samoa. North America is about 3,300 miles (5,300 kilometers) northeast and New Zealand the same distance southwest, placing Palmyra Atoll at the approximate center of the Pacific Ocean. The land area is 4.6 sq mi (12 km^{2}), with about 9 miles (14 km) of sea-facing coastline and reef. There is one boat anchorage, known as West Lagoon, accessible from the sea by a narrow artificial channel and an old airstrip; during World War II it was turned into a Naval Air Station for several years and used for training and refueling. It was shelled by a submarine in December 1941, days after the attack on Pearl Harbor, but was not the site of a major battle. Palmyra has, over time, had many of its islets merged together, so the actual amount of contiguous land depends on the tide and locations of sandbanks. For example, Strawn, Menge, and Cooper Islands are one contiguous island. Likewise, there are many shoals and coral heads on the atoll, which is ringed by a coral reef.

It is the second-northernmost of the Line Islands and one of three American islands in the archipelago, along with Jarvis Island and Kingman Reef. Palmyra Atoll is part of the Pacific Islands Heritage Marine National Monument, the world's largest marine protected area. The atoll comprises submerged sand flats along with dry land and reefs. It comprises three lagoons separated by coral reefs. The western reef terrace is one of the biggest shelf-reefs, with dimensions of 2 by 3 miles (3.2 by 4.8 km). Over 150 species of coral inhabit Palmyra Atoll, double the number recorded in Hawaii.

Palmyra Atoll has no permanent population, but there is a steady stream of temporary staff and visitors for research, tourism, and other projects such as marine science or survey work. It is administered as an incorporated unorganized territory, presently the only one of its kind, by the United States Fish and Wildlife Service of the United States Department of the Interior. The territory hosts a variable transient population of 4–25 staff and scientists employed by various departments of the U.S. government and by The Nature Conservancy, as well as a rotating mix of Palmyra Atoll Research Consortium scholars. Submerged portions of the atoll are administered by the Department of the Interior's Office of Insular Affairs.

In 2000, most of the land on the atoll, excluding only the Home and possibly Sand islets, was bought by The Nature Conservancy for US$30 million (GBP 21 million) from the Fullard-Leo family.

== Geography ==
The atoll consists of an extensive reef, three shallow lagoons, and a number of sand and reef-rock islets and bars covered with vegetation—mostly coconut palms, Scaevola, and tall Pisonia trees.

Many of the islets are connected. Sand Island and the two Home Islets in the west; Quail, Whippoorwill, and Bunker Islands in the north; and Eastern, Fern, Bird, and Barren Islands in the east are not. The largest island is Cooper Island in the north, followed by Kaula Island in the south. The northern arch of islets is formed by Strawn Island, Cooper Island (or Cooper-Meng Island since the original Cooper and Meng Islands were joined in 1940), Aviation Island, Quail Island, Whippoorwill Island, Bunker Island, followed in the east by Eastern Island, Papala Island and Pelican Island, and in the south by Bird Island, Holei Island, Engineer Island, Tanager Island, Marine Island, Kaula Island, Paradise Island, the Home Islets, and Sand Island (clockwise).

Palmyra Atoll is in the Samoa Time Zone (UTC−11:00), the same time zone as American Samoa, Midway Atoll, Kingman Reef and Jarvis Island.

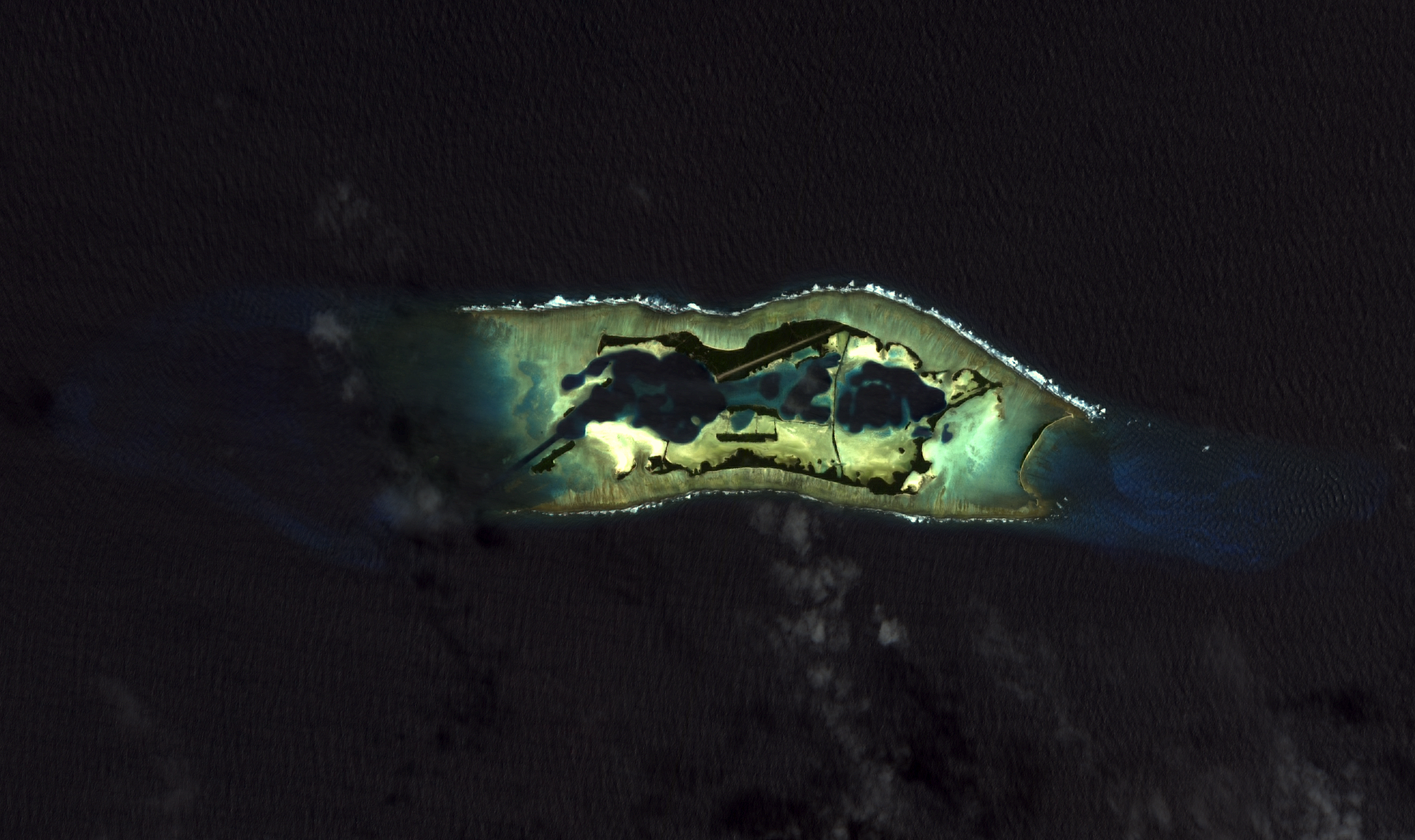
Palmyra Atoll, 2010 satellite image

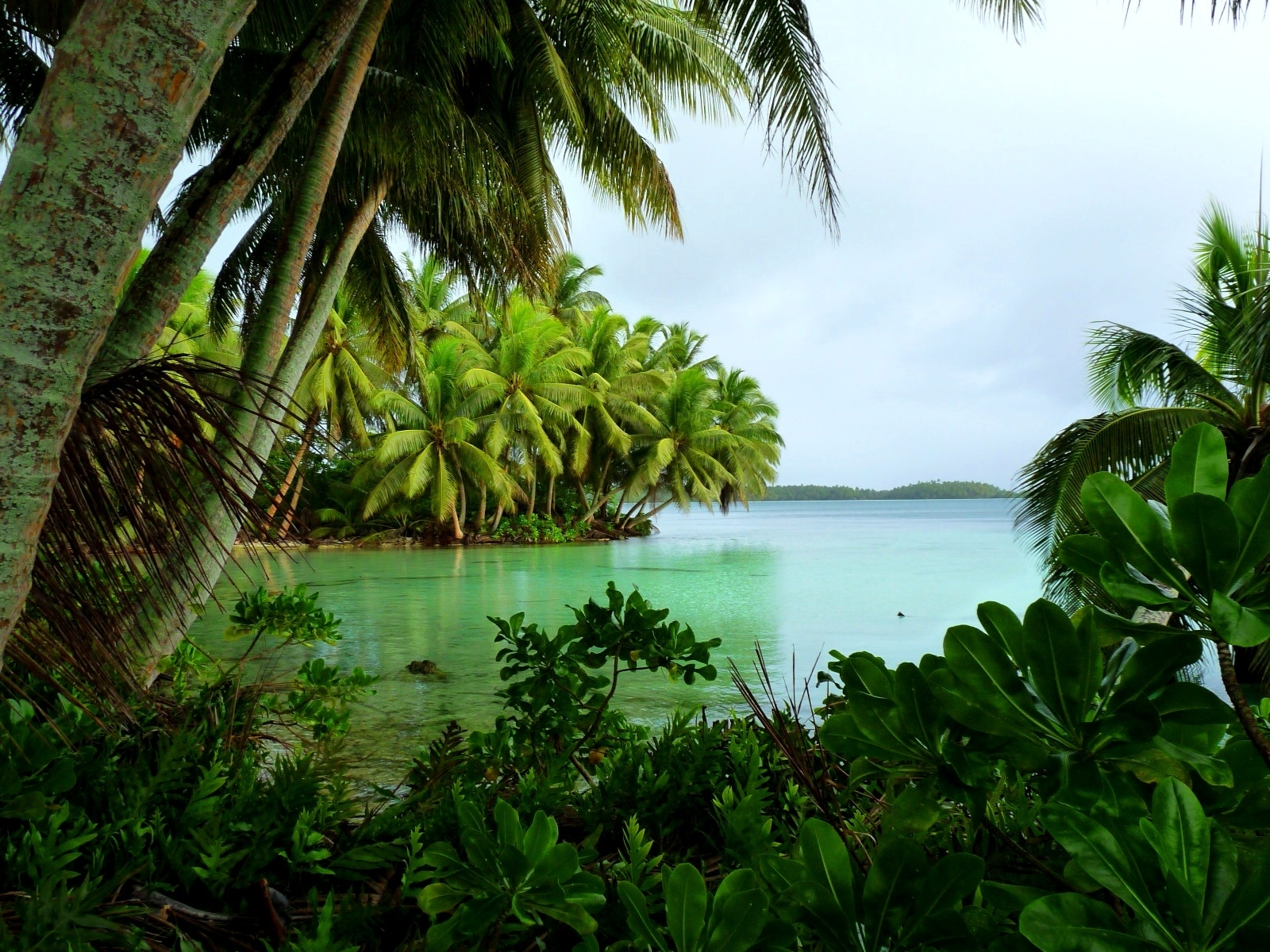
Coconut palms on Strawn Island at Palmyra Atoll

=== Incorporation into the United States ===
In The Insular Cases, the Supreme Court held incorporated territories to be integral parts of the United States, as opposed to mere possessions. The incorporated Palmyra Atoll is the southernmost point of the incorporated United States, with its southernmost shore at 5°52′15″N latitude. U.S.-controlled territories such as American Samoa (and the southernmost place, Rose Atoll) are farther south, but they are not incorporated territories.

=== Climate ===
Average annual rainfall is approximately 175 in (4,400 mm) per year. Temperatures average 85 °F (29 °C) year round. The atoll has nearly the highest oceanicity index (i.e., the degree to which its climate is affected by the sea) and one of the lowest diurnal and annual temperature variations of any place on Earth. Nauru has more consistent nighttime temperatures with every month recording 77 °F (25 °C) average, as well as more evenly spread precipitation.

Climate data for Palmyra Atoll
Month	Jan	Feb	Mar	Apr	May	Jun	Jul	Aug	Sep	Oct	Nov	Dec	Year
Mean daily maximum °F (°C)	84 (29)	83 (28)	84 (29)	85 (29)	85 (29)	85 (29)	85 (29)	85 (29)	86 (30)	85 (29)	85 (29)	85 (29)	85 (29)
Mean daily minimum °F (°C)	76 (24)	75 (24)	76 (24)	77 (25)	77 (25)	77 (25)	77 (25)	76 (24)	77 (25)	77 (25)	76 (24)	77 (25)	77 (25)
Average rainfall inches (mm)	13.3 (340)	8.5 (220)	9.8 (250)	7.3 (190)	12.1 (310)	16.6 (420)	17.1 (430)	20.1 (510)	10.9 (280)	10.0 (250)	14.3 (360)	20.3 (520)	160.3 (4,080)
Average rainy days	14.5	12.3	15.3	11.8	17.2	17.9	20.2	19.8	13.6	14.3	14.5	16.5	187.9
Source: Weatherbase.com

=== Official names ===
Although Palmyra is a coral atoll with several islets, not a single island, it has been called Palmyra Island since its discovery in 1802. More recently it is for some purposes called Palmyra Atoll. The name of the federal territory retained by Congress since 1959 is Palmyra Island, but the official name of the National Wildlife Refuge within the territory is Palmyra Atoll, as is the corresponding division of the Pacific Islands Heritage Marine National Monument. Formal deeds, leases and federal orders for land there call it Palmyra Island. Further, the islets on the atoll are also named island, such as Kaula Island, Cooper Island, and others. The biggest single island is Cooper Island, located on the lagoon's north side.

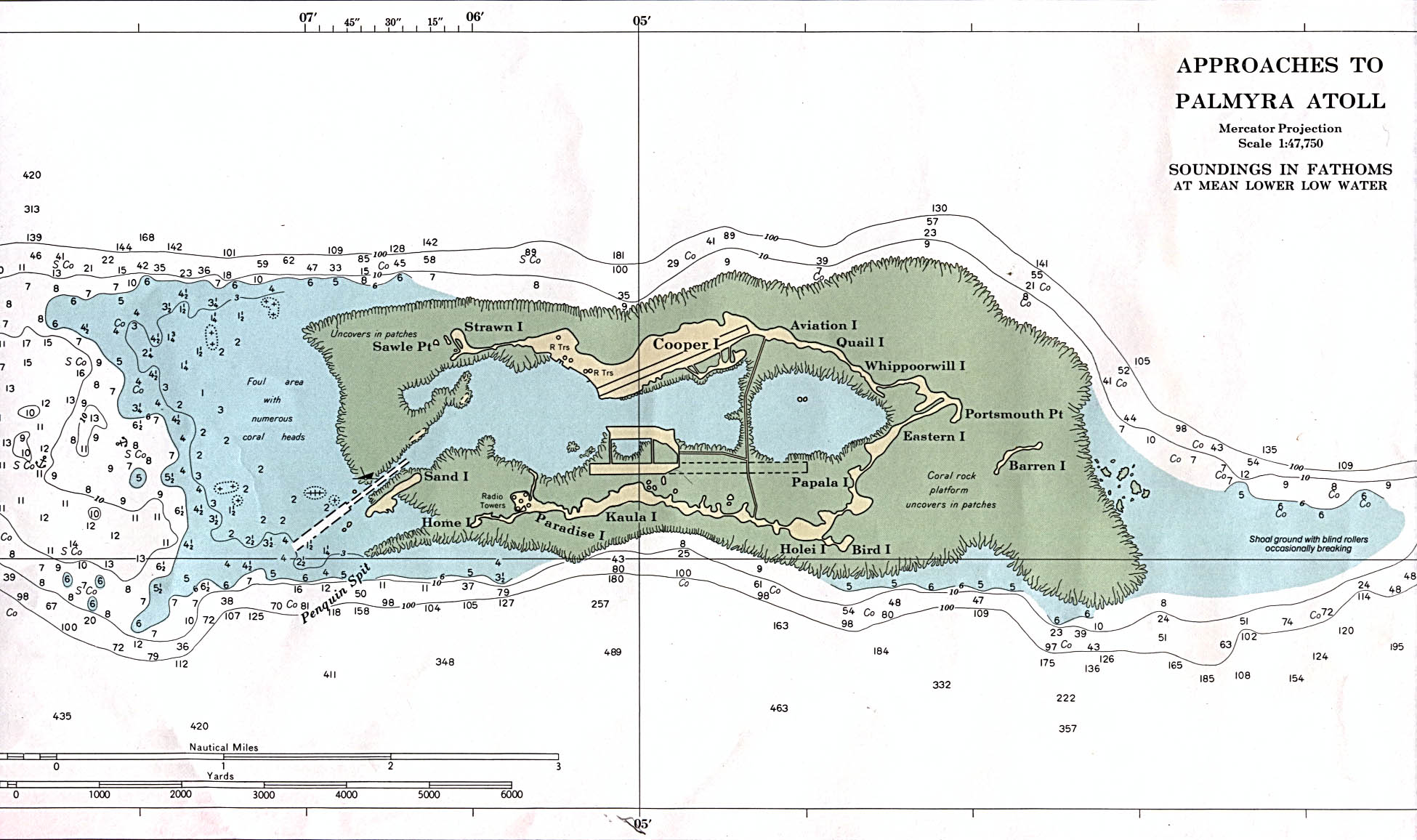
Palmyra Atoll – NOAA Nautical Chart (1:47,500), with many named features

== Political status ==
Map showing the Palmyra exclusive economic zone in context with the United States territories

Palmyra is an incorporated territory of the United States (the only such territory since 1959), meaning that it is subject to all provisions of the U.S. Constitution and is permanently under American sovereignty. Palmyra remains an unorganized territory. No Act of Congress since Hawaii statehood in 1959 has specified how Palmyra is to be governed. The only relevant federal law gives the president the authority to administer Palmyra as directed or via the United States District Court for the District of Hawaii (Hawaii Omnibus Act, Pub. L. 86–624, July 12, 1960, 74 Stat. 411). Executive Order 10967, effective October 10, 1961, provided that the Department of the Interior be responsible for all executive, legislative, and judicial authority of its civil administration.

The governance issue is generally a moot point since no permanent population lives there. Cooper Island and ten other land parcels in this atoll are owned by The Nature Conservancy, which manages them as a nature reserve. The southwesternmost islets, including Home, are owned by descendants of former Palmyra owner Henry Ernest Cooper and others. The rest of Palmyra is federal land and waters under the jurisdiction of the U.S. Fish and Wildlife Service. Since Palmyra has no state or local government, it is administered directly from Honolulu by the U.S. Fish and Wildlife Service, except for some submerged tracts administered by the Office of Insular Affairs, both in the U.S. Department of the Interior. Palmyra is counted as one of the U.S. minor outlying islands for all other purposes; they are outside the customs territory of the United States and have no customs duties. Civil administration of the submerged territory is vested ex officio with the Deputy Assistant Secretary of the Office of Insular Affairs, while the remainder of the territory is administered by the U.S. Fish and Wildlife Service's superintendent of the Pacific Islands Heritage Marine National Monument.

Palmyra land was registered in Hawaii Land Court in 1912. In 1959, the rest of the federal Territory of Hawaii, excluding Palmyra, became the state of Hawaii. Hawaii Land Court became a state court and lost jurisdiction over Palmyra land. Instead, Palmyra land documents are filed or recorded in federal court in Honolulu.

== Economy ==
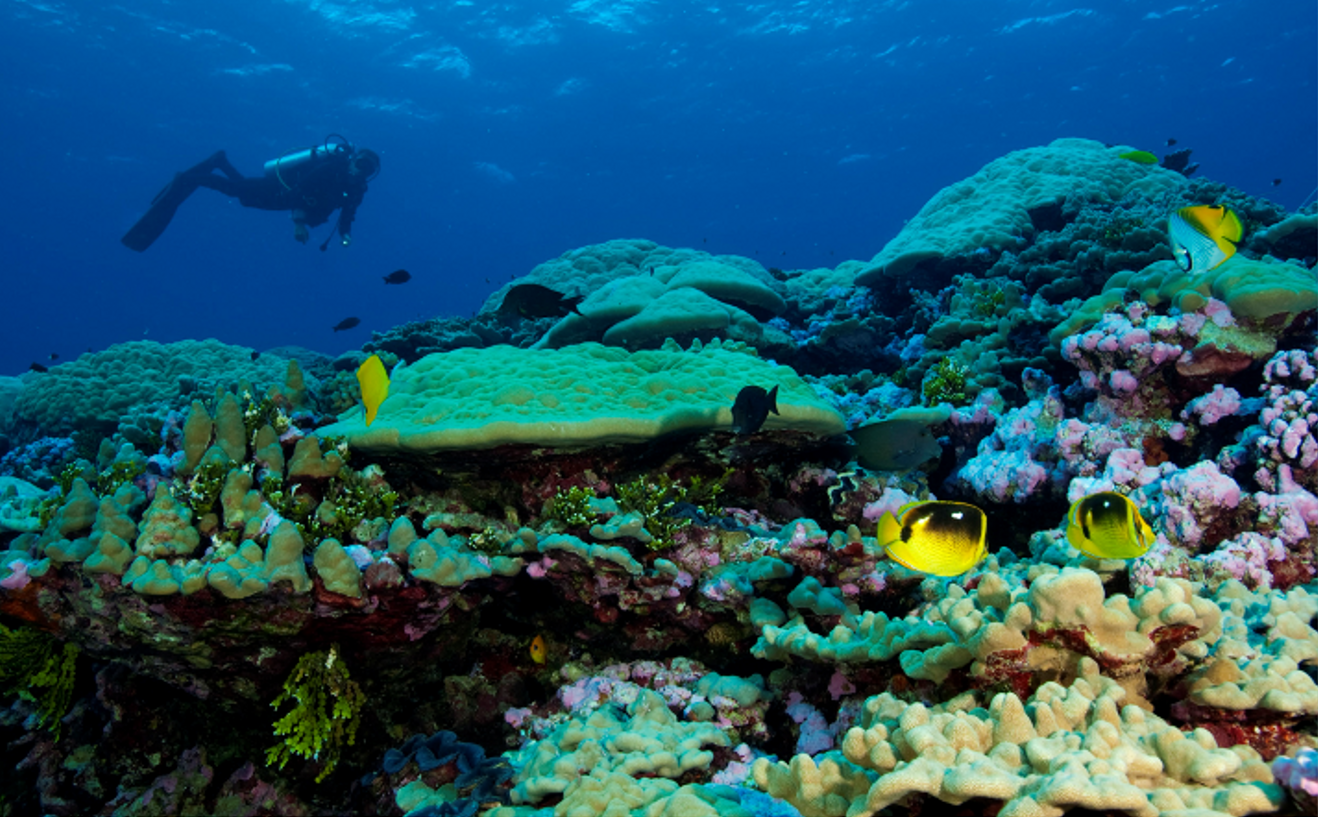
Scuba diver explores Palmyra's corals.

The only current economic activity on Palmyra is paid ecotourism visits by TNC donors. Most roads and causeways were built during World War II. Most of these are now unserviceable and overgrown, and most causeways and filled areas between islets have washed-away gaps. A 2,000-yard-long (1,800 m) unpaved airstrip on Cooper Island was built for the Palmyra Island Naval Air Station before and during World War II.

== Airport ==
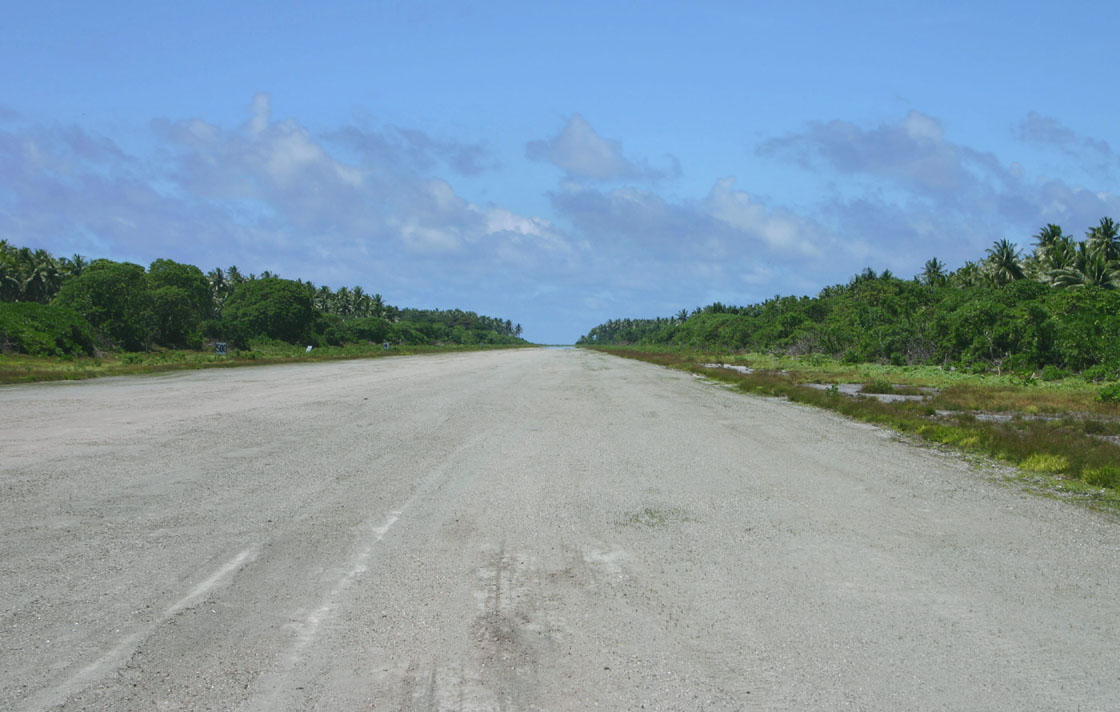
Palmyra Airstrip on Cooper Islet

Palmyra (Cooper) Airport (ICAO: PLPA, FAA LID: P16) is an unattended airport on Palmyra Atoll in the Pacific Ocean. It is a private-use facility, originally built during World War II and now owned by The Nature Conservancy. It has one runway (6/24) measuring 5,000 ft × 150 ft (1,524 m × 46 m). When built, the airport was called Palmyra Atoll Airfield, and later Palmyra Island Naval Air Station as it was a former Naval airfield on the Palmyra Atoll in the Line Islands of the Central Pacific Area. The name for the airport comes from Henry Ernest Cooper Sr. (1857–1929), who owned Palmyra from 1911 to 1922.

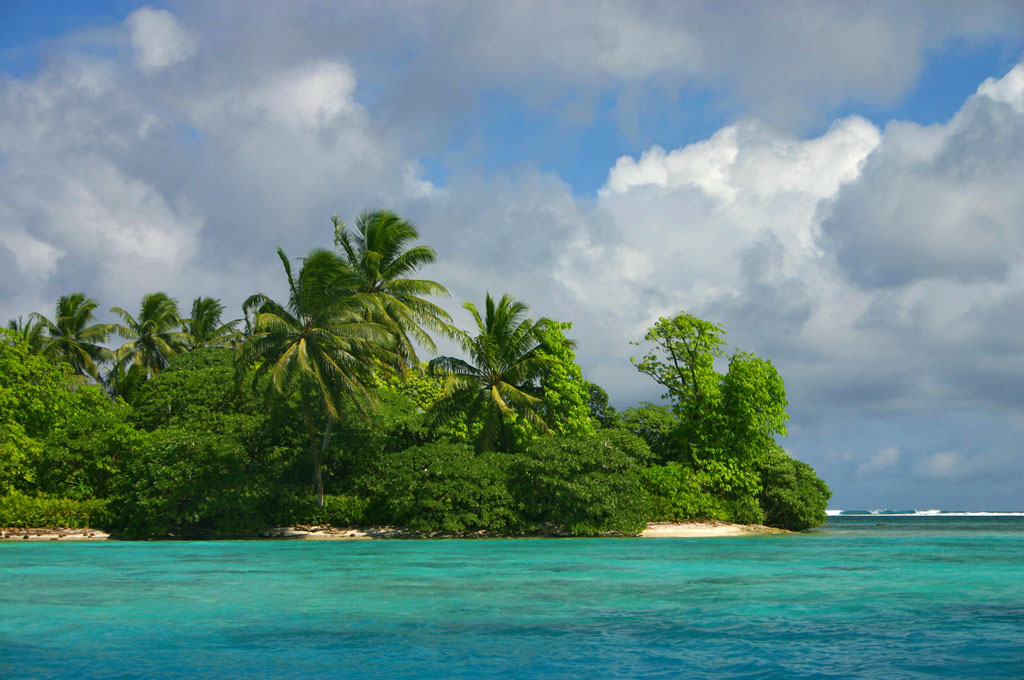
Sand Island in the 21st century

Preliminary surveys were made by the U.S. Navy in 1938 for an airfield at this location. The first Navy group to begin construction sailed from Honolulu on November 14, 1939. The runway was made from crushed coral and expanded during World War II. During World War II, the U.S. Naval Construction Battalion dredged a channel so that ships could enter the protected lagoons and bulldozed coral rubble into a long, unpaved landing strip for refueling transpacific supply planes at the airbase. On January 16, 1942, six Boeing B-17 Flying Fortress bombers from Hawaii were stationed at the airbase, commanded by Lt. Col. Walter C. Sweeney Jr. as part of Hawaiian Air Force's Task Group 8. Marine Corps VMF-211 pilots also used the airfield. During World War II, two other runways were built and used, one on Meng Island and another on Sand Island. These runways are now overgrown with plants and returning to the jungle. The U.S. Air Force maintained the main airfield until 1961.

The airstrip still exists but can be used only after prior permission has been obtained or in an emergency.

== History ==
=== Discovery ===
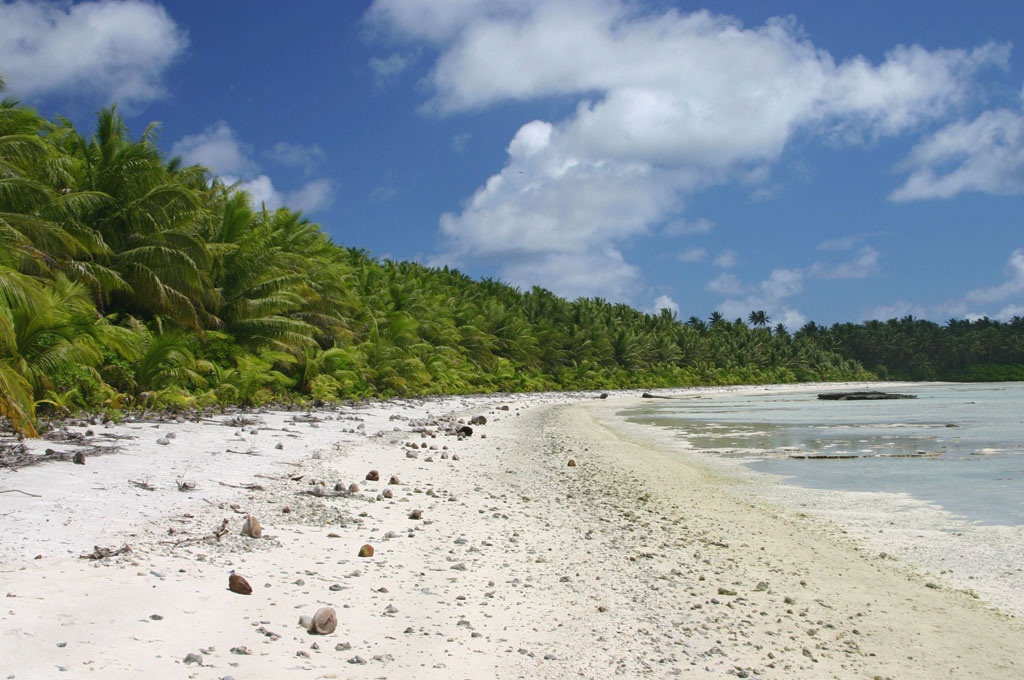
Palmyra's North Beach

The first known sighting of Palmyra came in 1798 aboard the American sealing ship Betsy on a voyage to Asia, according to the memoir of Captain Edmund Fanning of Stonington, Connecticut. Fanning wrote that he had awakened three times during the night before, and after the third time took it as a premonition, ordering Betsy to heave to for the rest of the night. The next morning, Betsy resumed sailing, but only about a nautical mile farther on, he believed he sighted the reef later known as Palmyra Island. It might have been wrecked if the ship continued on her course at night. Captain Fanning's claim to have discovered Palmyra itself has been challenged, on the view that he had only reached Kingman Reef 34 miles (55 kilometers) away and could not possibly have seen Palmyra from that distance. On page 3, the Baltimore newspaper The Telegraphe and Daily Advertiser of July 29, 1803, appears to quote directly from Fanning's journal: "We supposed that we saw land from the masthead to the southward of the shoal (Kingman Reef) but it was so hazy we were not certain." This would stand in conflict with Fanning's book of 1833, in which he, while referring to Kingman Reef, wrote "I went aloft, and with the aid of the glass could plainly see the land over it, far in the south."

On November 7, 1802, the ship Palmyra, under Captain Cornelius Sowle (sometimes spelled "Sawle"), was shipwrecked on the reef, which took the vessel's name. Lacking a navigable boat passage through the reef from the sea, it had never been inhabited. A lack of archaeological surveys on the atoll leaves the question of habitation before European contact open. As a result, no marae, basalt artifacts or evidence of Polynesian, Micronesian or other pre-European native settlements before 1802 have been reported on Palmyra. At the time of his discovery, Captain Sowle wrote:

There are no inhabitants on the island, nor was any fresh water found; but cocoanuts [sic] of a very large size, are in great abundance; and fish of various kinds and in large shoals surround the land.

=== Esperanza treasure ===
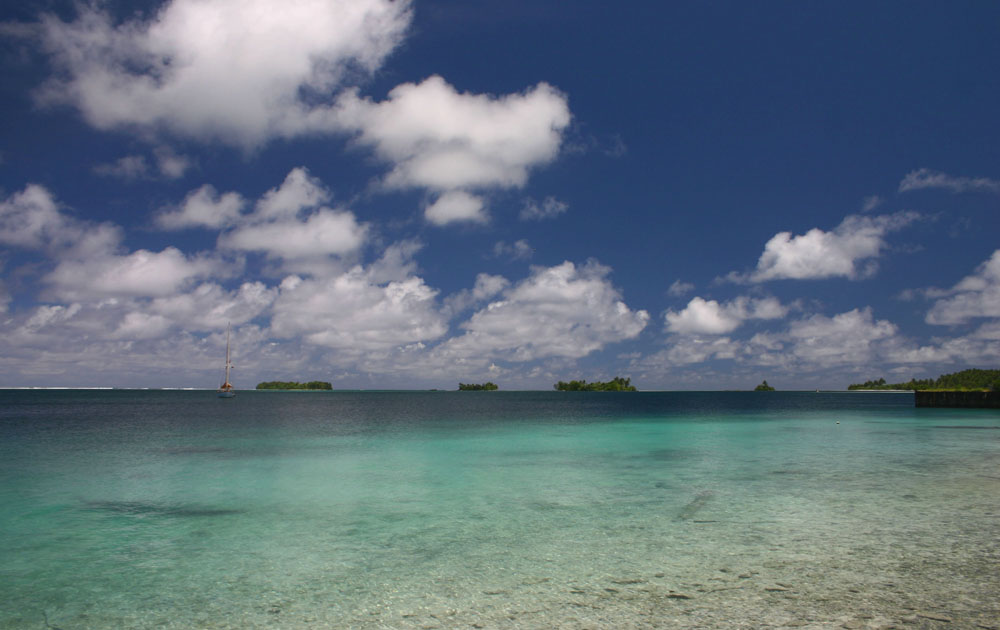
Palmyra Lagoon

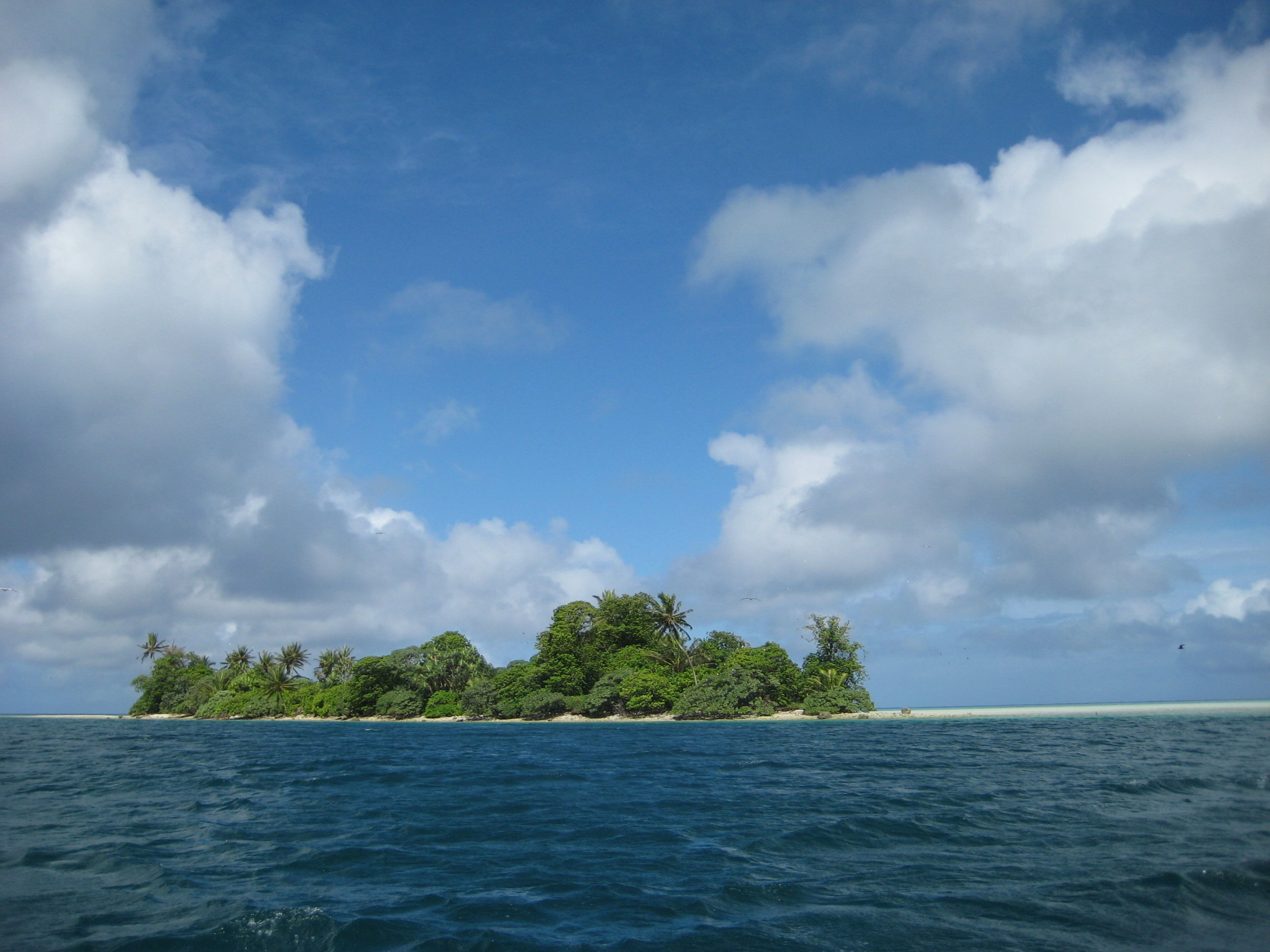
Sand bar and islet of Palmyra

During the 19th and 20th centuries, stories circulated in the Pacific of a large treasure of gold, silver and precious stones (sometimes described as Inca treasures) that had been looted in the Viceroyalty of Peru. A crew loaded it in secret onto the ship Esperanza in Callao harbor, Peru, and embarked into the Pacific Ocean on January 1, 1816, bound for the Spanish West Indies.

According to a survivor, seaman James Hines, the Esperanza was caught in a storm that dismasted and damaged the ship. After that, it was attacked and boarded by pirates, who loaded the treasure and surviving crew onto their own ship. The Esperanza sank, and the pirates and their captives sailed west across the Pacific bound for Macao.

After 43 days, the pirates' ship met a storm, lost course, and struck the coral reef surrounding Palmyra Island, breaking the mast. The 90 men aboard pulled the ship closer to land, but it was not serviceable. They offloaded the treasure to the island, distributed some, and buried the rest. They repaired part of their boat, and most crew shipped away, not to be heard from again. The remaining ten men spent most of a year on Palmyra, living on dwindling stores and local food. They spent three months building a small escape boat, upon which six men left Palmyra. Of these, four were washed overboard in a storm, and the other two were rescued by an American whaler bound for San Francisco. One died en route. The survivor, James Hines, was put in a hospital, but he died 30 days later.

Before Hines died, he wrote letters describing the affair and the location of the treasure, which originally included 1.5 million Spanish gold pesos and an equal value in silver (possibly consisting of precolumbian artworks). Around 1903, over 95 years later, the letters were allegedly deposited for safekeeping with Capt. William R. Foster, the harbormaster of Honolulu, by a sailor who was bound for the Solomon Islands but never returned. After holding the letters for 20 years in an iron chest, Foster revealed them to a reporter, who published the details. A conflicting variant of the story was published by Capt. F. D. Walker of Honolulu in 1903 and in 1914. In 1997, William A. Warren filed a federal salvage claim for a ship sunk off the atoll that he claimed had treasure from the Esperanza, but he abandoned his claim after legal objection from the Fullard-Leos, who owned most of Palmyra.

The legend of the Esperanza and Santa Rosa (a ship rumored to have recovered the Esperanza treasure and sailed back to Honolulu) inspired a Jack London story called "The Proud Goat of Aloysius Pankburn", which was published as part of London's David Grief stories in the Saturday Evening Post.

=== American visits ===
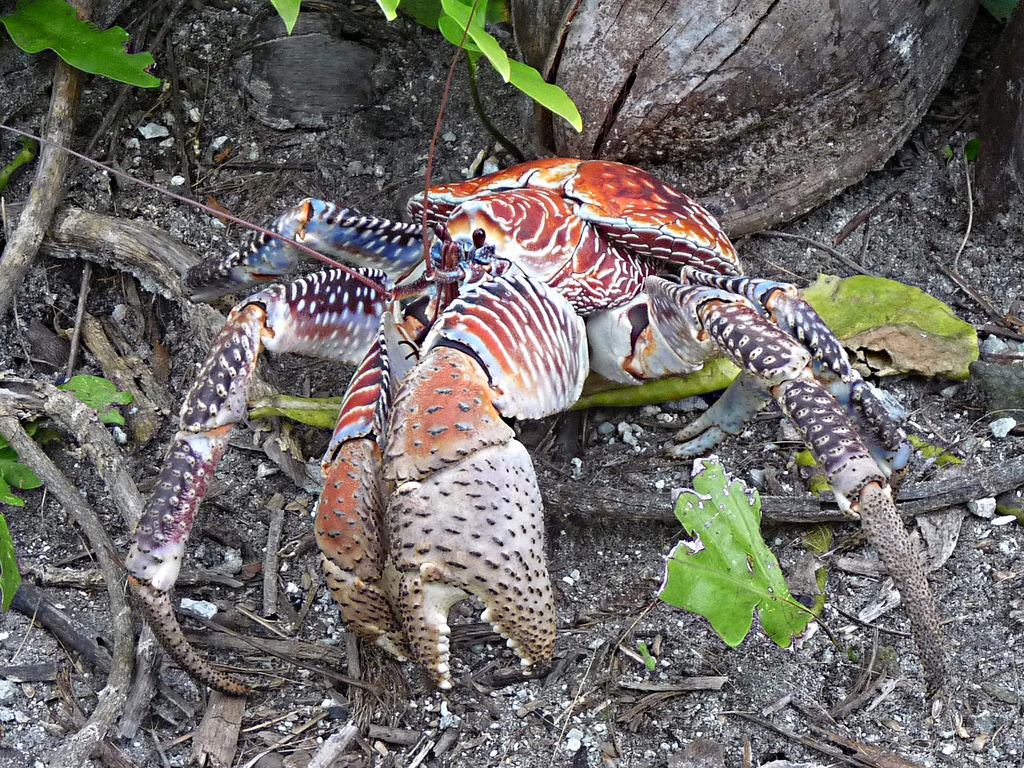
A coconut crab on Palmyra

The atoll was visited by the USS Porpoise in 1842 as part of the United States Exploring Expedition, led by Charles Wilkes. This marked the first visit to Palmyra by a scientific expedition. Various live samples of native plants and animals were collected. In his 23rd volume recording the findings of the USXX (United States Exploring Expedition of 1838–1842), Wilkes wrote of Palmyra, mentioning some unspecified inhabitants at that time:

This island is inhabited ... It is to be regretted that all these detached islands should not be visited by our national vessels, and friendly intercourse kept up with them. The benefit and assistance that any shipwrecked mariners might derive from their rude inhabitants, would repay the time, trouble, and expense such visits would occasion.

In 1859, Palmyra Atoll was claimed for the United States both by Alfred Benson and by Dr. Gerrit P. Judd of the brig Josephine, under the Guano Islands Act of 1856, but no guano was there to be mined, so the claims were abandoned.

=== Annexation by the Kingdom of Hawaii (1862) ===
On February 26, 1862, King Kamehameha IV of Hawaii commissioned Captain Zenas Bent and Johnson Beswick Wilkinson, both Hawaiian citizens, to take possession of the atoll. On April 15, 1862, it was formally annexed to the Kingdom of Hawaii, while Bent and Wilkinson became joint owners.

Over the next century, ownership passed through various hands. Bent sold his rights to Wilkinson on December 25, 1862. Palmyra later passed to Kalama Wilkinson (Johnson's widow). In 1885, it was divided among her four heirs, two of whom sold their rights to William Luther Wilcox who, in turn, sold them to the Pacific Navigation Company. In 1897, this company was liquidated, and its interests were sold first to William Ansel Kinney and then to Fred Wundenberg, all residents of Honolulu.

A further Wilkinson heir left her share to her son William Ringer Sr., who also bought his great-uncle's share, giving Ringer a one-third undivided share as a tenant in common.

Separately, in 1889, Commander Nichols of HMS Cormorant claimed Palmyra for the United Kingdom, unaware of Hawaii's prior claim.

=== Part of the U.S. Territory of Hawaii (1900–1959) ===
Tallest Pisonia grandis tree at Palmyra, with Henry E. Cooper in 1913

In 1898, the United States by the Newlands Resolution annexed the Republic of Hawaii, formerly the Provisional Government of Hawaii, and Palmyra with it. An Act of Congress made all of Hawaii, including Palmyra, into an "incorporated territory" of the United States. (Act of April 30, 1900, ch. 339, §§ 4–5.) On June 14, 1900, Palmyra became part of the new U.S. Territory of Hawaii.

With the imminent opening of the Panama Canal, Palmyra became strategically important. Britain had established a submarine cable station for the All Red Line on nearby Fanning Island. The U.S. Navy sent USS West Virginia to Palmyra, where on February 21, 1912, American sovereignty was formally reaffirmed.

William Ringer Sr. died in 1909, survived by his wife and three minor daughters.

On June 12, 1911, Wundenberg's widow sold his two-thirds undivided interest in Palmyra as a tenant in common to Judge Henry Ernest Cooper (1857–1929).

In 1912, Cooper bought the Ringer daughters' inherited rights from their legal guardian, and petitioned to register Torrens title to all of Palmyra for himself. After a legal challenge, Cooper's ownership of the atoll was held by the Supreme Court of Hawaii to be subject to rights sold by Ringer's widow to Henry Maui and Joseph Clarke. Maui's and Clarke's interests, per the U.S. Supreme Court in 1947, had been divided, with one-third going to Bella Jones of Honolulu in 1912, and the rest passing to their heirs.

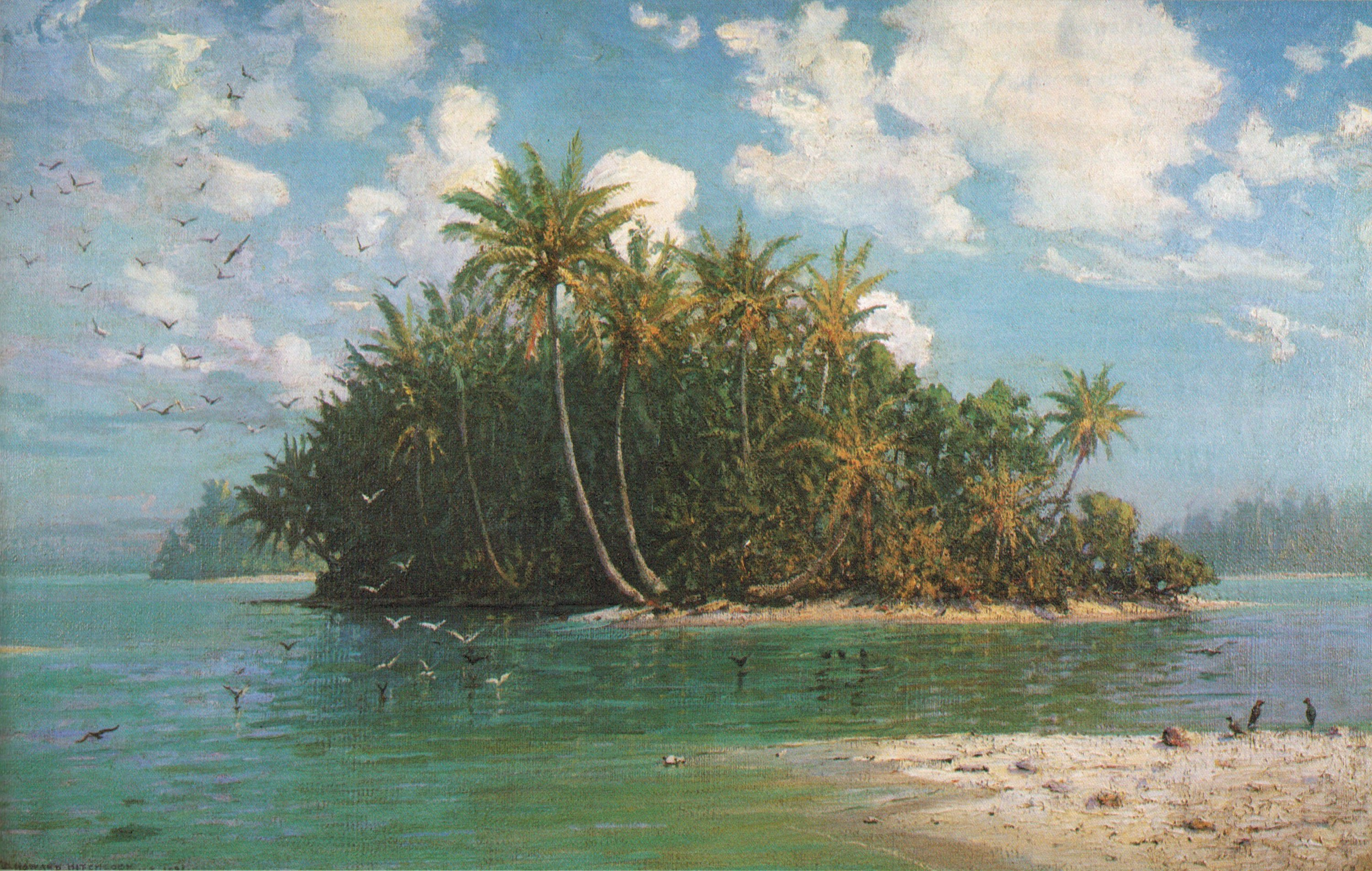
D. Howard Hitchcock's 1923 painting Palmyra

Cooper visited the island in July 1913 with scientists Charles Montague Cooke Jr. and Joseph F. Rock, who wrote a scientific description of the atoll. Botanist Rock discovered unusual coconut palms in 1913, which palms expert Odoardo Beccari identified as Cocos nucifera palmyrensis (Becc.), the coconut type with the largest, longest and most triangular (in cross-section) fruits in the world, existing only at Palmyra. (The closest Cocos nucifera relative occurs only in the distant Nicobar Islands in the Indian Ocean.) The "mammoth coconuts" were put on display in Honolulu in 1914 along with paintings of Palmyra by Hawaiian artist D. Howard Hitchcock, who had accompanied Cooper to the island.

In September 1921, as part of a national push to better document the coastal and outlying areas owned by the United States, a small naval detachment was sent to Palmyra to conduct the first aerial surveys of the atoll. The events of that trip were recorded by a naval Pharmacist Mate, M. L. Steele, who wrote:

During our visit the weather was delightful. The detachment remained at these islands two days and they were perfect for flying, affording an opportunity to take wonderful aerial pictures. The commanding officer and the aviators made a number of flights and the official photographer was in his element.

At the time, Palmyra was occupied by three Americans: Colonel William Meng, his wife, and Edwin Benner Jr. While there, the USS Eagle Boat 40, which had transported aircraft and photographic equipment to the islands, made a very rare exception to naval regulation and took aboard the wife, Mrs. Meng, to return her to Honolulu for medical aid, as she was not handling the isolation and trying physical conditions of Palmyra well.

On August 19, 1922, Cooper sold his interest in the atoll, except for two minor islets, to Leslie and Ellen Fullard-Leo for $15,000 (equivalent to $288,519 in 2025). They established the Palmyra Copra Company to harvest the coconuts growing on the atoll. Their three sons, including actor Leslie Vincent, continued as the owners afterward, subject to a period of military administration and construction by the Navy before and during World War II from 1939 through 1945. In 2000, The Nature Conservancy acquired the majority of Palmyra Atoll from the Fullard-Leo family for $30 million (equivalent to $56,086,957 in 2025).

=== U.S. Navy base and post-war (1939–1959) ===
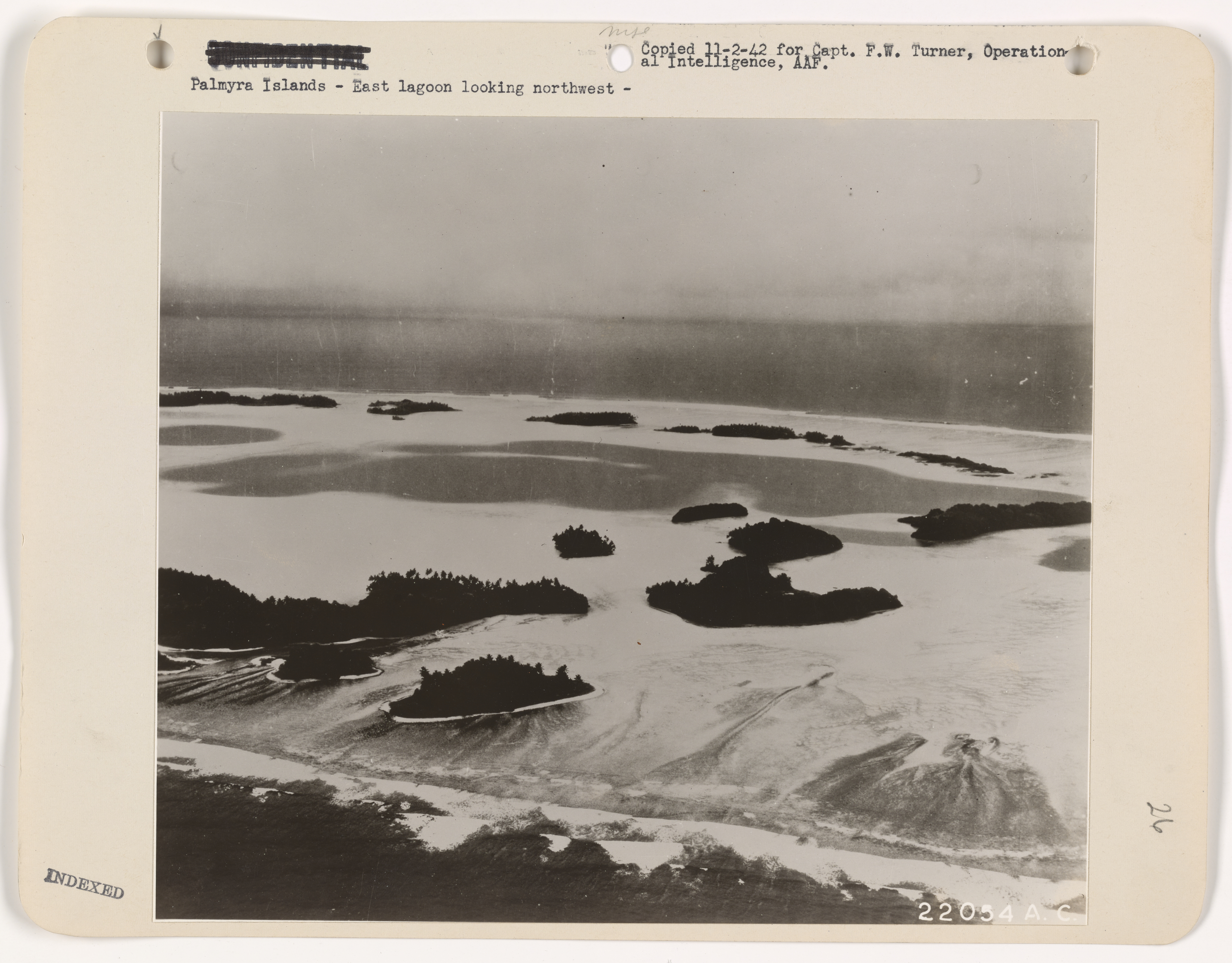
WWII-era photo looking across the atoll

Palmyra was turned into a military base in the Pacific at the start of World War II after some legal questions were resolved. The island was fortified when it found itself on the front lines of the Pacific due to the losses of U.S. territories to the west. It was shelled once early in the war, but due to U.S. military success, it was later used for refueling and training. After World War II, it was returned to private ownership, and the naval base was mostly demolished.

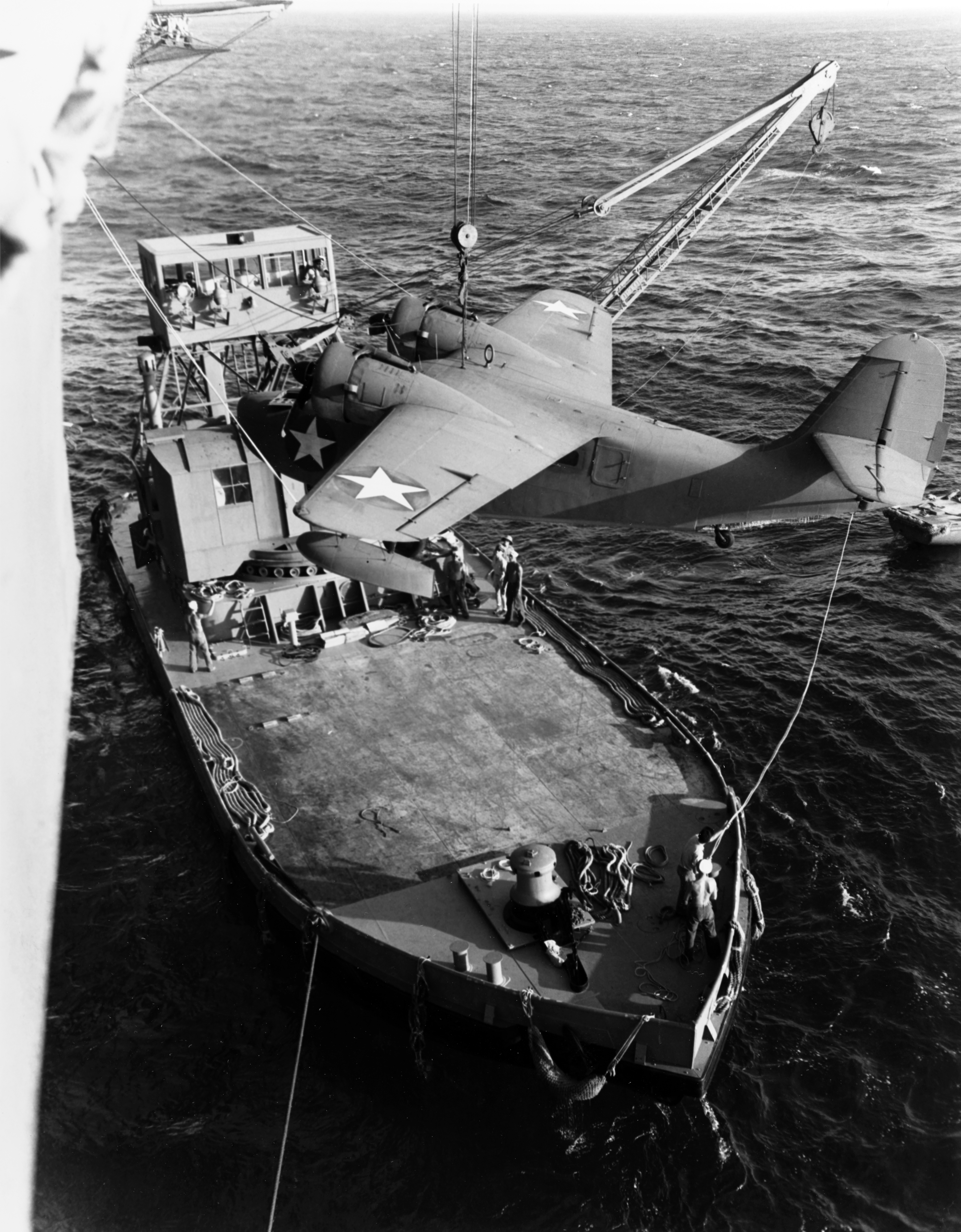
Grumman JRF Goose is hoisted aboard USS Long Island (ACV-1) off Palmyra Island, April 19, 1943.

==== Background ====
Several memoirs, reports, and unofficial documents in the decades since World War II have stated Palmyra was placed under naval jurisdiction in 1934 as part of Executive Order 6935. However, Palmyra is not mentioned in this order in any capacity. The first official mention of Palmyra under Naval Jurisdiction comes from a 1939 letter from the U.S. Attorney General, mentioned in a 1997 Insular Areas report, concluding "Palmyra was U.S. public land and that the Fullard-Leo claim was invalid. S. Rep. No. 83-886 at 37." Soon after this determination, President Roosevelt issued Executive Order 8616, officially, "Placing Palmyra Island, Territory of Hawaii, Under the Control and Jurisdiction of the Secretary of the Navy".

Starting in 1937, the Fullard-Leo family began attempts to lease Palmyra to the U.S. Navy. During negotiations, the government filed a quiet title action against the Fullard-Leos and Henry Ernest Cooper's six surviving children, claiming property at Palmyra had never been privately owned under the Kingdom of Hawaii or later. The case reached the U.S. Supreme Court. The Insular Areas report states, "While the suit was pending during World War II, the Navy occupied Palmyra and built a runway and several buildings." The Fullard-Leos and Coopers finally won their case in United States v. Fullard-Leo et al., 331 U.S. 256 (1947), which quieted good land title against the federal government in favor of private landowners. The opinion acknowledged certain of Henry Maui's and Joseph Clarke's interests (331 U.S. 256 at 278) but their heirs and their successor Mrs. Bella Jones were not made parties to the case. As of 2007, descendants of Henry Cooper still owned two small Home islets in the southwestern tip that were not sold in 1922.

In July 1938, Secretary of the Interior Harold L. Ickes wrote a letter to President Roosevelt, imploring him not to turn Palmyra over to the U.S. Navy for use as a military base. Quoting his letter, he writes,

... the Navy Department has plans for the acquisition and development of the island as an air base. Our representatives have studied conditions at Palmyra and other islands in the south Pacific, and they report that use of this small land area as an air base for Navy Department purposes would undoubtedly destroy much, if not all, that makes the island one of our most scientifically and scenically unique possessions.

The letter was unsuccessful, and plans for the base proceeded.

On February 14, 1941, Roosevelt issued Executive Order 8682 to create naval defenses areas in the central Pacific territories. The proclamation established the "Palmyra Island Naval Defensive Sea Area", encompassing the territorial waters between the extreme high-water marks and the three-mile marine boundaries surrounding the atoll. "Palmyra Island Naval Airspace Reservation" was also established to restrict access to airspace in the area. Only U.S. government ships and aircraft were permitted to enter the naval defense areas at Palmyra Atoll unless authorized by the Secretary of the Navy. The Navy took over the atoll for use as the Palmyra Island Naval Air Station on August 15, 1941. From November 1939 through 1947, the atoll had resident federal government representatives and island commanders. The atoll was shelled by a Japanese submarine in 1941, with no significant damage or injuries. The government made extensive alterations to the landforms. It blasted and dredged a ship channel from the open sea into the West Lagoon, which had been completely enclosed by islands and reefs and was non-navigable until the channel reached the lagoon on May 15, 1941. It joined islands with causeway roads, built new islands, and extended existing islands with dredged coral spoil, including the main runway on Cooper Island, an emergency landing strip called Sand Island joined by a causeway to Home Island and two artificial runway islands that were not completed. These alterations blocked the water flow through the atoll and are believed to have severely harmed the natural ecology of the lagoons.

==== Pacific war ====
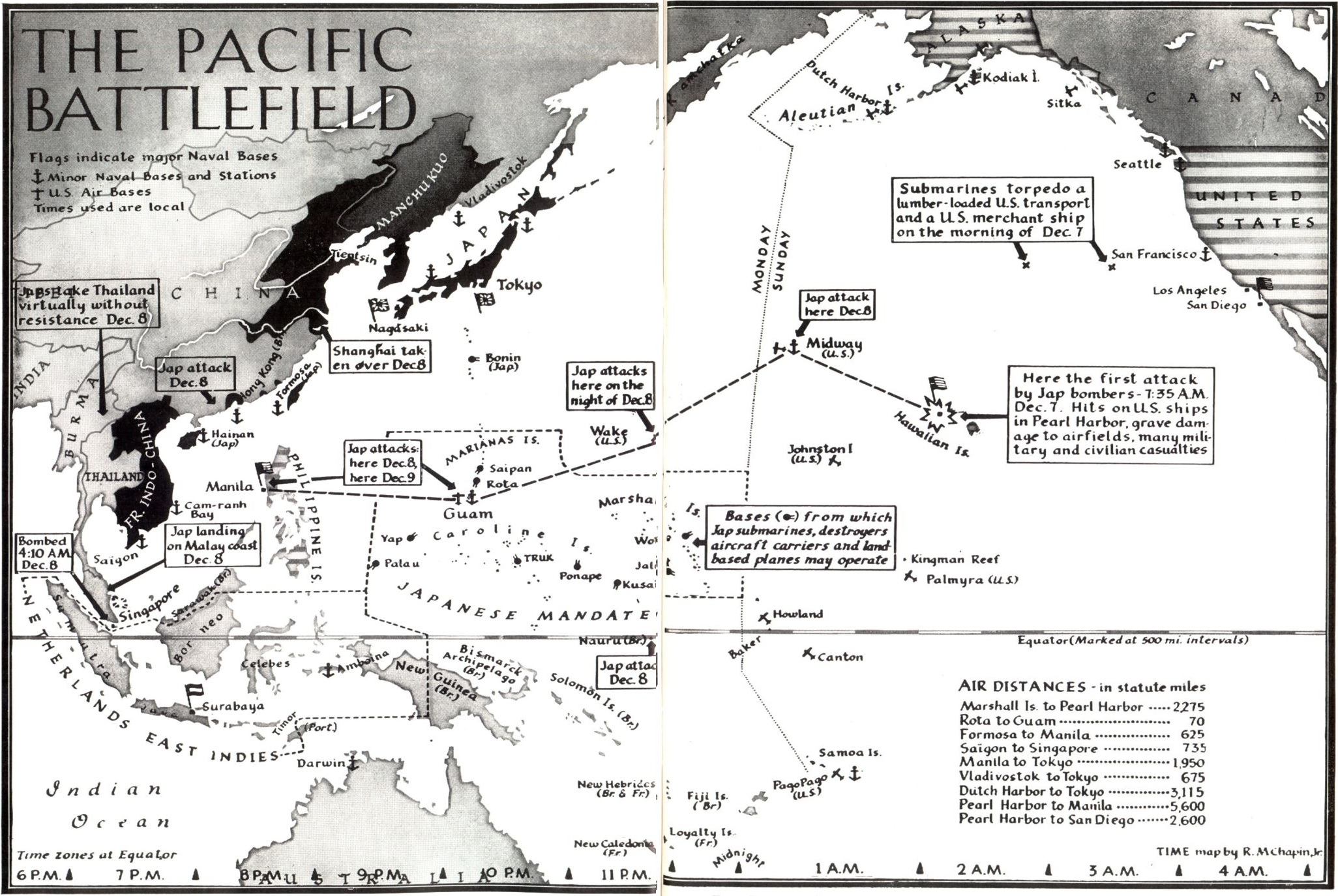
In December 1941, Palmyra found itself on the front lines of the Pacific War.

In December 1941, the Empire of Japan declared war on the United States and Great Britain. It launched attacks and invasions across Asia and the Pacific, plunging the United States into World War II. In that context, the Imperial Japanese Navy submarine I-75 bombarded the naval air station on December 24, 1941. Opening fire at 04:55 Greenwich Civil Time, the submarine fired twelve 120-millimeter (4.7 in) rounds from the deck gun, targeting the atoll's radio station, and hit the United States Army Corps of Engineers dredge Sacramento, which was anchored in the lagoon, with one shell. A 5-inch (127 mm) coastal artillery battery on the atoll returned fire, forcing I-75 to submerge and withdraw.

Although the U.S. lost control of the Philippines, Guam, and Wake, early in the war, the tide of the Pacific battle was slowly turned with such battles as the Battle of Midway and Guadalcanal. By 1944, much of the Southwest Pacific was in Allied control, and a combination of island hopping and strategic bombing led to the Japanese surrender in 1945. During the war Palmyra base was used by the Navy for training and refueling. The atoll was extensively developed which reduced the numbers of islets from 52 to 25.

In the lobby of the "Transient Hotel" (built by the Seabees, and used by airmen on their way to the Pacific Theater front), a mural was hung depicting a quiet island scene. It was painted by Academy Award–nominated art director William Glasgow, who served in the Army from 1943 to 1945. However, it is unclear when he painted it and how it ended up on Palmyra.

In 1947, the base was returned to private ownership after a court case with the Federal government.

After World War II, much of the Naval Air Station was demolished, with some of the materials piled up and burned on the atoll, dumped into the lagoon, or, in the case of unexploded ordnance on some islets, left in place. Compared to other bases little is known about the operations at Palmyra during WW2. However, it is known that the island was extensively modified.

=== U.S. Territory of Palmyra Island (1959–present) ===
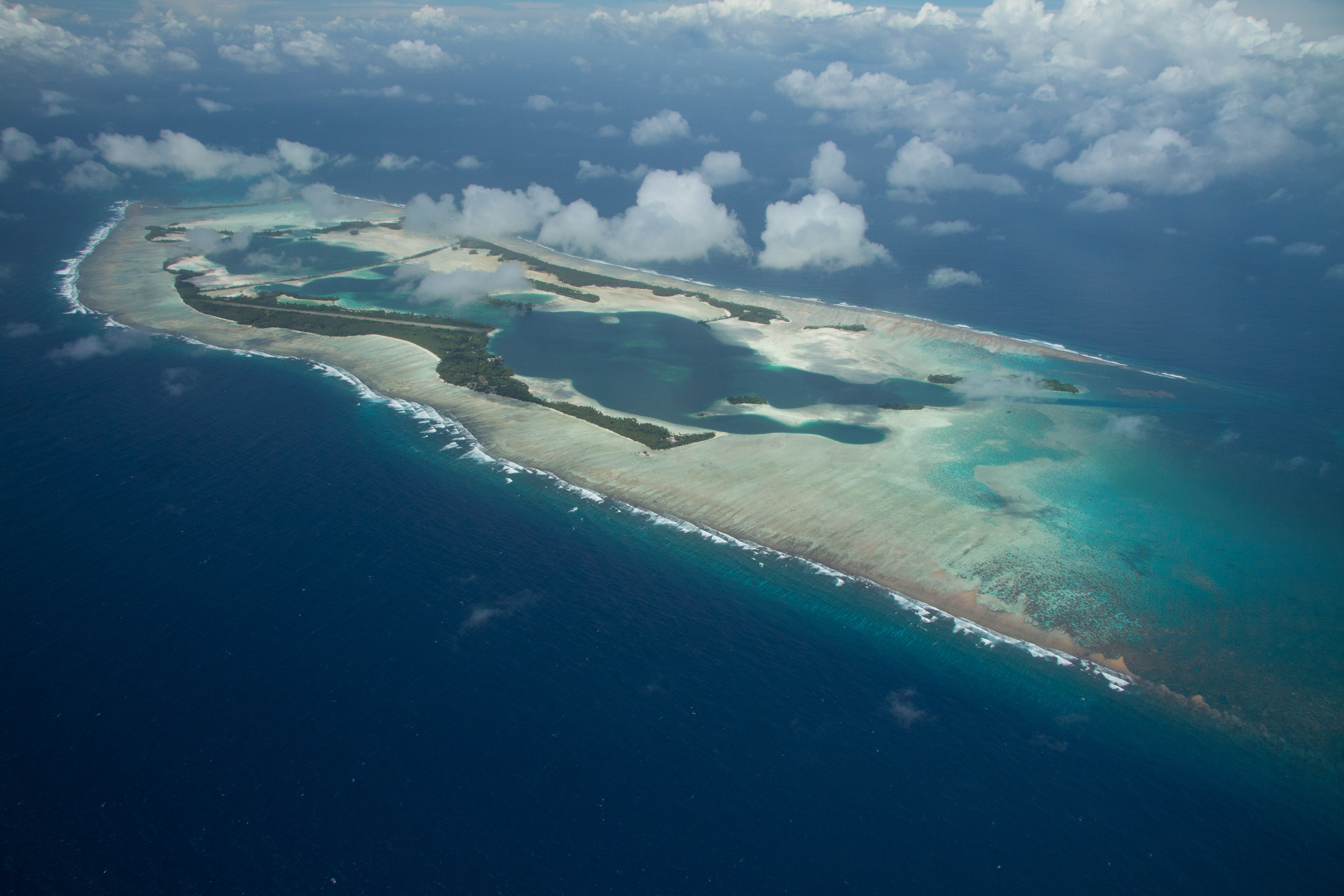
Palmyra Atoll viewed from the northwest, 2011

When Hawaii was admitted to the United States in 1959, Palmyra was explicitly separated from the new state, remaining a federal incorporated territory, to be administered by the secretary of the interior under a presidential executive order.

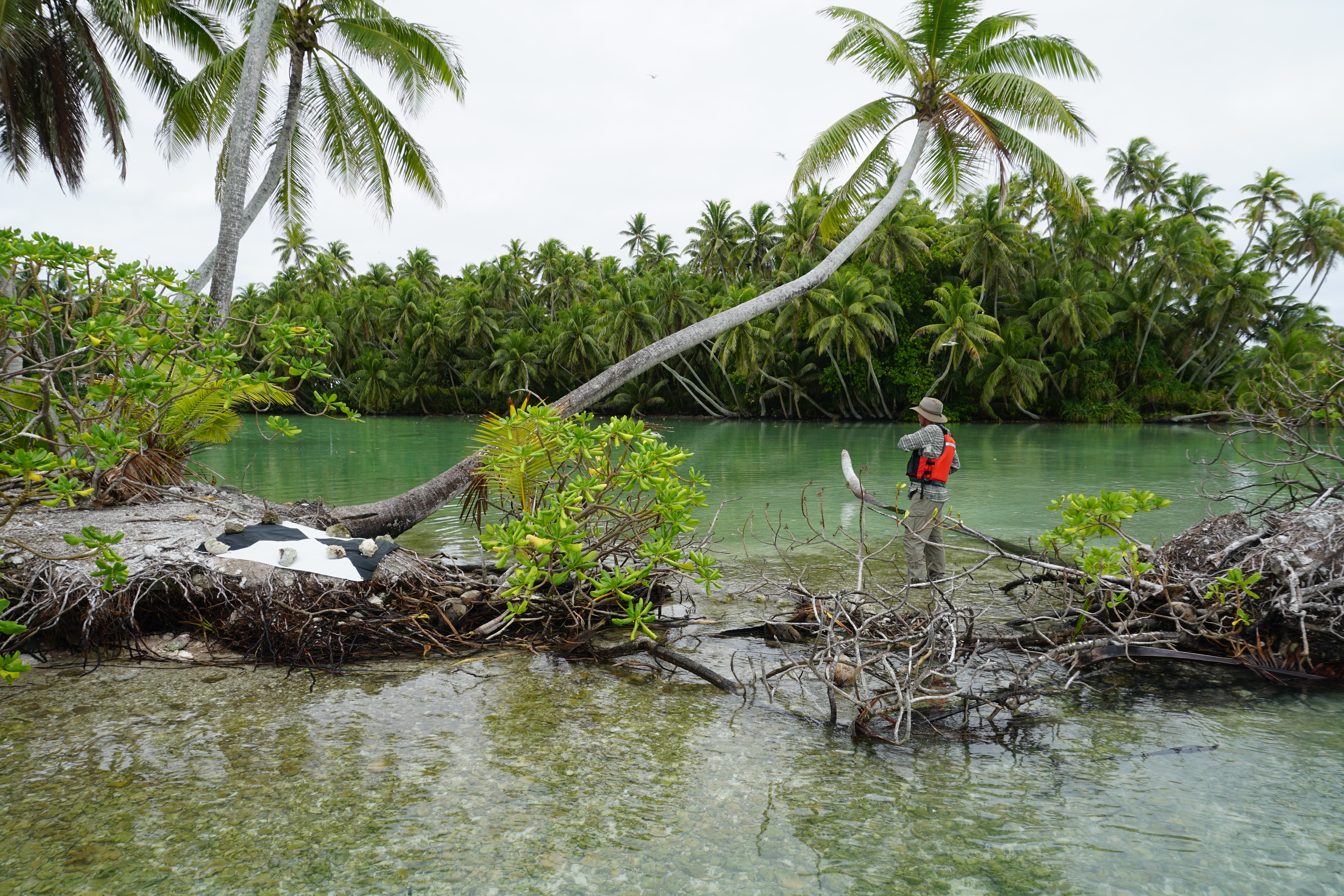
A USGS employee does survey work at Palmyra in 2016.

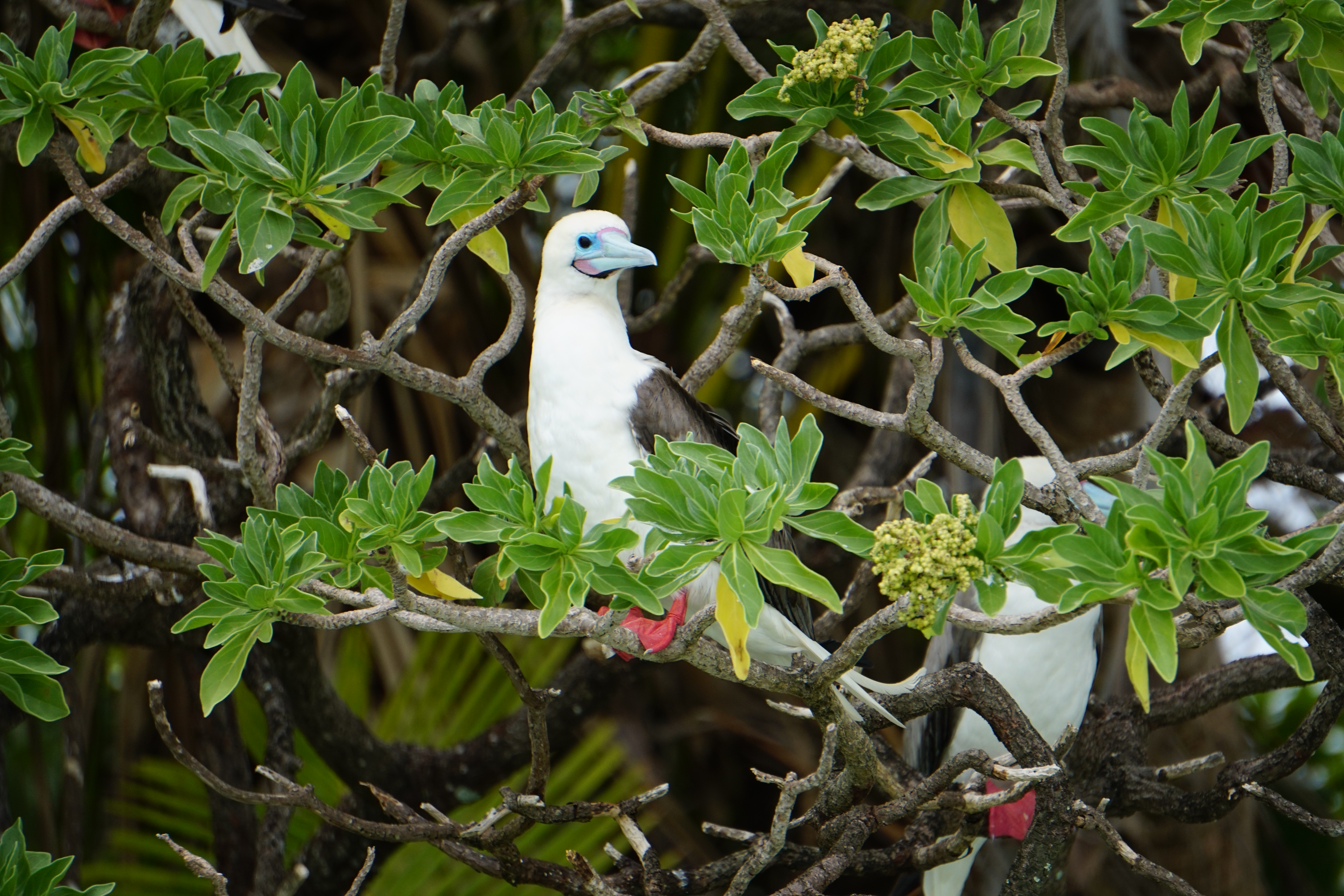
Wildlife at Palmyra

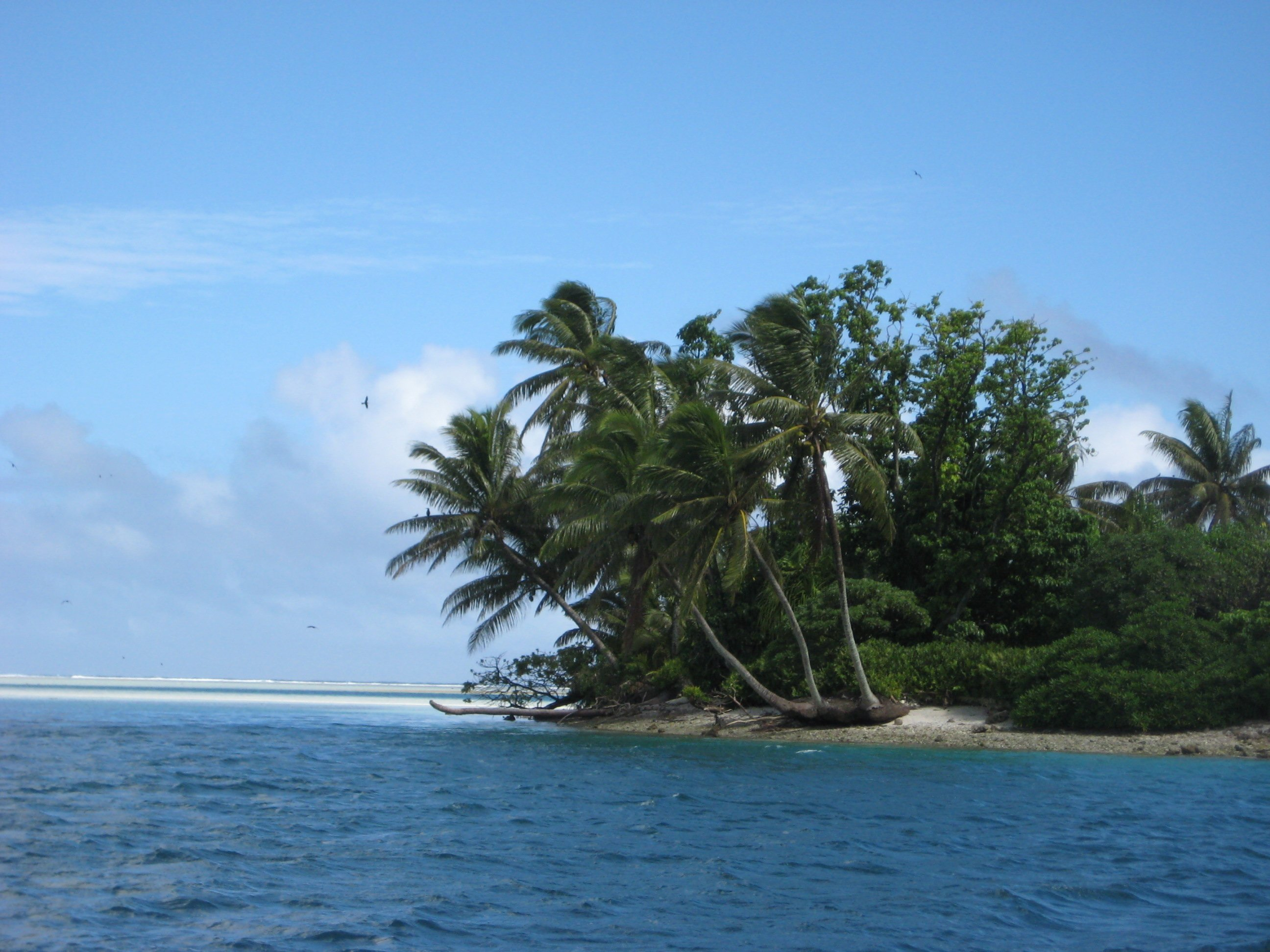
Islet of Palmyra

In 1962, the Department of Defense used Palmyra as an observation site during several high-altitude nuclear weapons tests high above Johnston Atoll. A group of about ten men supported the observation posts during this series of tests, while about 40 people carried out the observations.

Alby Mangels, the Australian adventurer and documentary filmmaker of World Safari, visited the atoll during his six-year trip in the 1970s.

In early 1979, the U.S. government began exploring the idea of storing nuclear waste on remote Pacific islands like Palmyra. Those who knew the island and the region saw no benefit to this idea, commenting on the devastating effects a leak of these storage tanks would create. By 1982 a formal proposal had been written which "analyzes the proposal to store spent nuclear fuel on Palmyra Island, a U.S. territory nearly a thousand miles south of Hawaii. The proposal has military, political, social, and technical implications." The idea was abandoned soon after the proposal, and no such storage facilities were built.

==== Sea Wind murder ====
In 1974, Palmyra was the site of a murder, and possible double murder, of a wealthy San Diego couple, Malcolm "Mac" Graham and his wife, Eleanor "Muff" Graham. The mysterious deaths, including the murder conviction of Duane ("Buck") Walker (a.k.a. Wesley G. Walker) for Eleanor Graham's murder, and the acquittal of his girlfriend, Stephanie Stearns, made headlines worldwide, and became the subject of a true crime book, And the Sea Will Tell, written by Bruce Henderson and Vincent Bugliosi, Stearns's defense attorney. The book led to a CBS television miniseries of the same name, starring James Brolin, Rachel Ward, Deidre Hall, and Hart Bochner; Richard Crenna played lawyer Bugliosi. The story was retold in The FBI Files.

Walker and Stearns were arrested in Honolulu in 1974 after returning from Palmyra aboard Sea Wind, the yacht stolen from the Grahams. Because no bodies were found at the time, Walker and Stearns were convicted only for the theft of the yacht. Six years later, a partially-buried, corroded chest was found in a lagoon at Palmyra, containing Eleanor Graham's remains. Walker and Stearns were arrested in Arizona for murder, and Walker was convicted in 1985. Stearns was acquitted in 1986 after her defense argued that Walker had committed the murders without Stearns's knowledge. Because no body or other evidence of Malcolm Graham's death has been discovered, his murder was never formally alleged.

Walker served 22 years in the United States Penitentiary, Victorville, California, before receiving parole in 2007. He wrote an 895-page book about his experiences and life on Palmyra Island, in which he denied killing Eleanor Graham. It states they had sexual relations; her husband Malcolm Graham caught them and shot at them in anger, inadvertently killing her. Walker said that the two men had a gunfight the next day and that Malcolm Graham consequently died from a rifle wound.

Walker accused author Vincent Bugliosi – Stearns' lawyer – of vainglory and exploiting class prejudice against him and wrote that his lawyer, Earle Partington, was incompetent. Walker did not implicate Stearns in any killing. Walker died in a nursing home following a stroke on April 26, 2010.

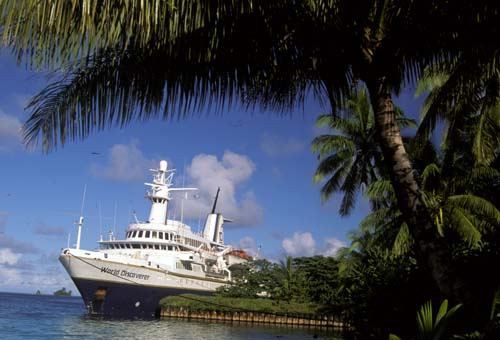
The ship MS World Discoverer at Palmyra

==== Sovereignty challenges (1997–1999) ====
In the late 1990s, Rachel Lahela Kekoa Bolt, a native Hawaiian heir of Henry Maui, and some of her descendants filed federal lawsuits claiming her inherited interest in Palmyra and challenging the legality of the Newlands Resolution that annexed Hawaii. The lawsuits challenged American sovereignty over both the State of Hawaii and the United States Territory of Palmyra Island. On similar grounds, they intervened in a federal marine salvage claim for a sunken treasure ship at Palmyra. The cases were dismissed on procedural grounds before trial (that is, determined to have no intrinsic merit).

==== National wildlife refuge and national monument ====
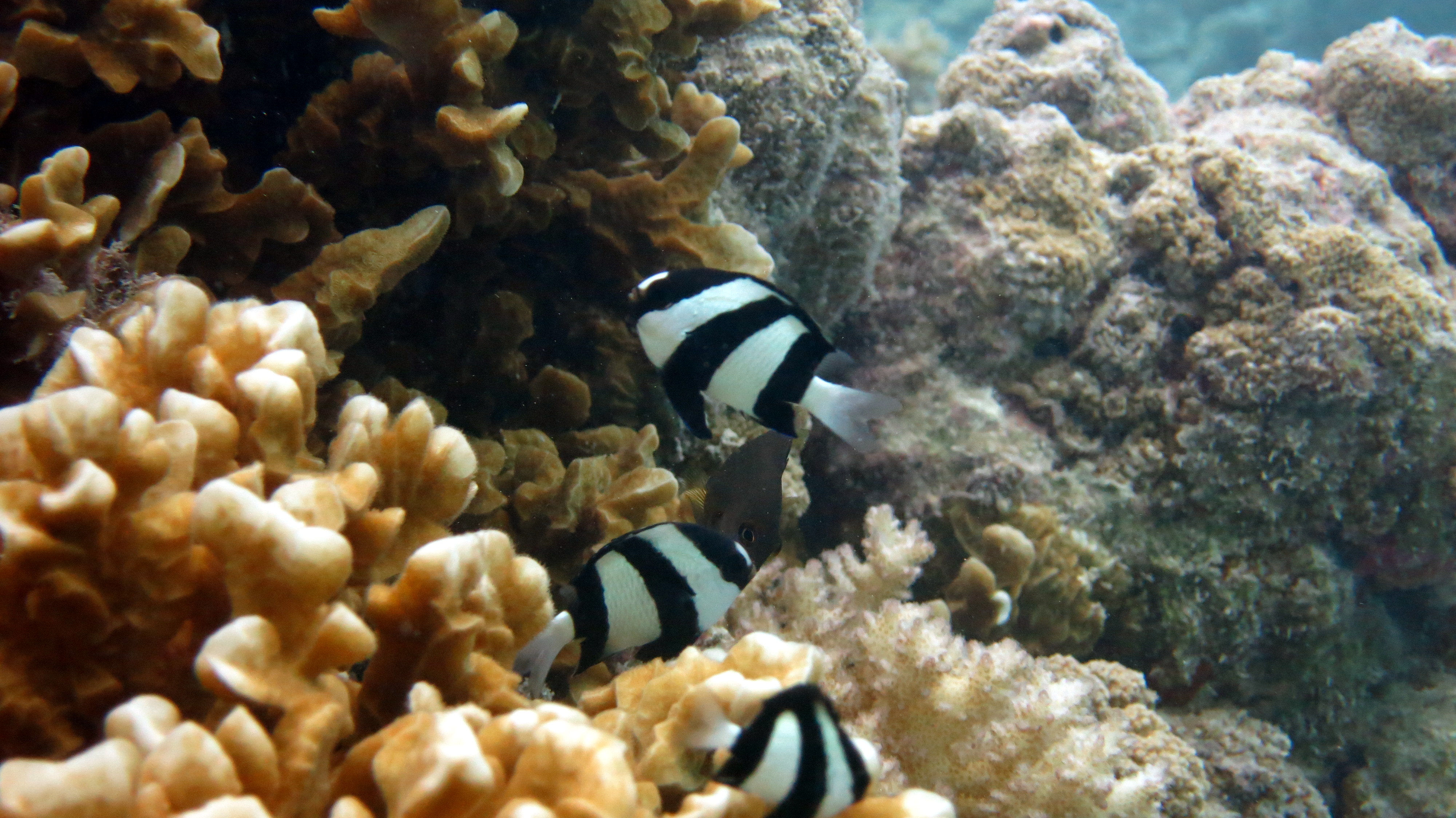
Humbug dascyllus swim among Palmyra corals.

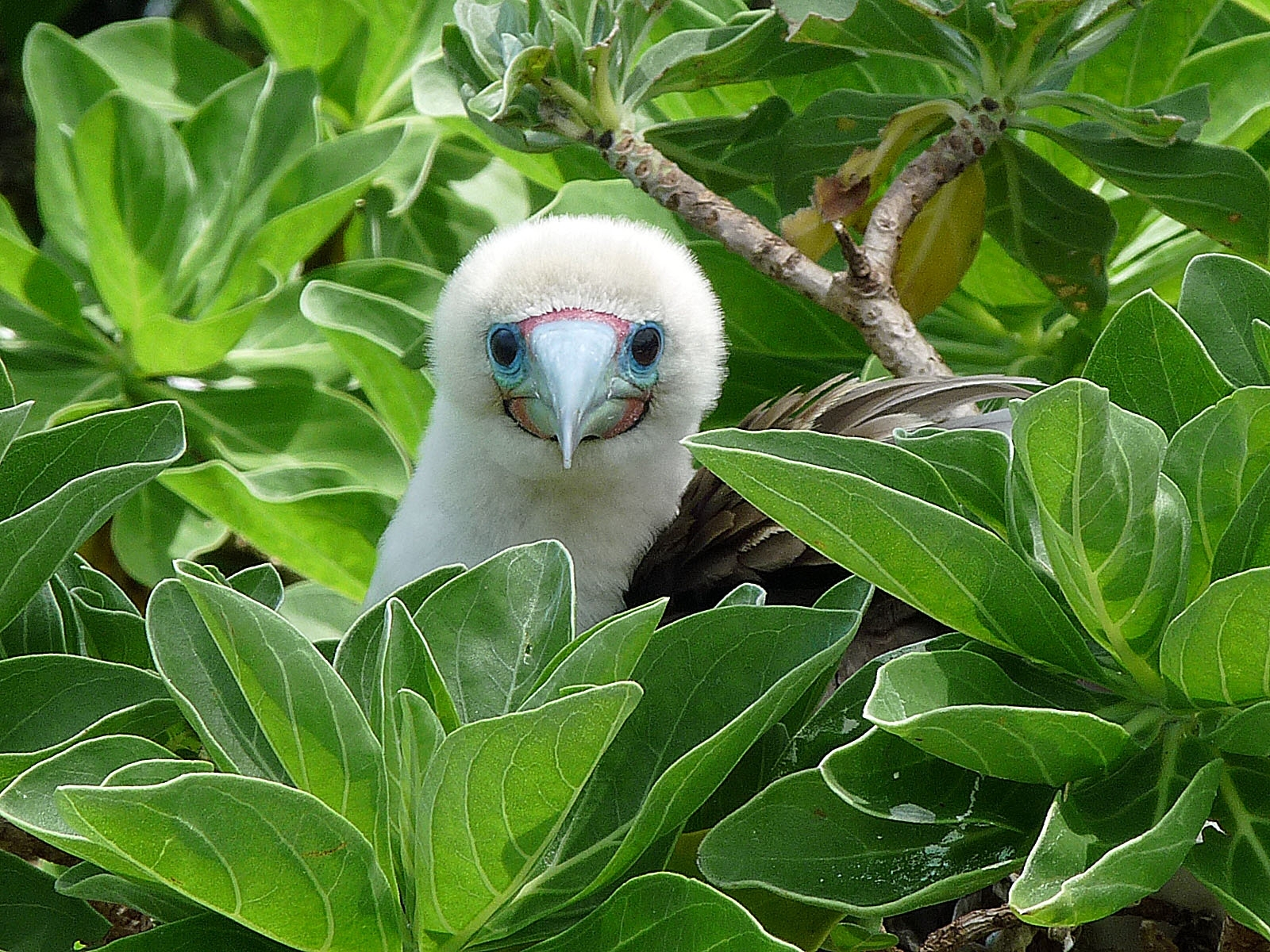
Red-footed booby seabird on Palmyra

In December 2000, The Nature Conservancy (TNC) bought most of Palmyra Atoll from the three Fullard-Leo brothers for coral reef conservation and research. In 2003, a scientific study was published about fossilized coral washing up on Palmyra. This fossilized coral was examined for evidence of the behavior of the effect of El Niño on the tropical Pacific Ocean over the past 1,000 years. The atoll was purchased for US$30 million; however, certain areas were later purchased by the United States government. TNC, Island Conservation, and the U.S. Fish and Wildlife Service manage the island, which is used for research. Major programs to eliminate rats and invasive palms have been conducted. One of the challenges has been understanding how the rich peaty soil that can be found on the island developed on the coral, and one of the overall goals is to maintain biodiversity globally in locations similar to Palmyra.

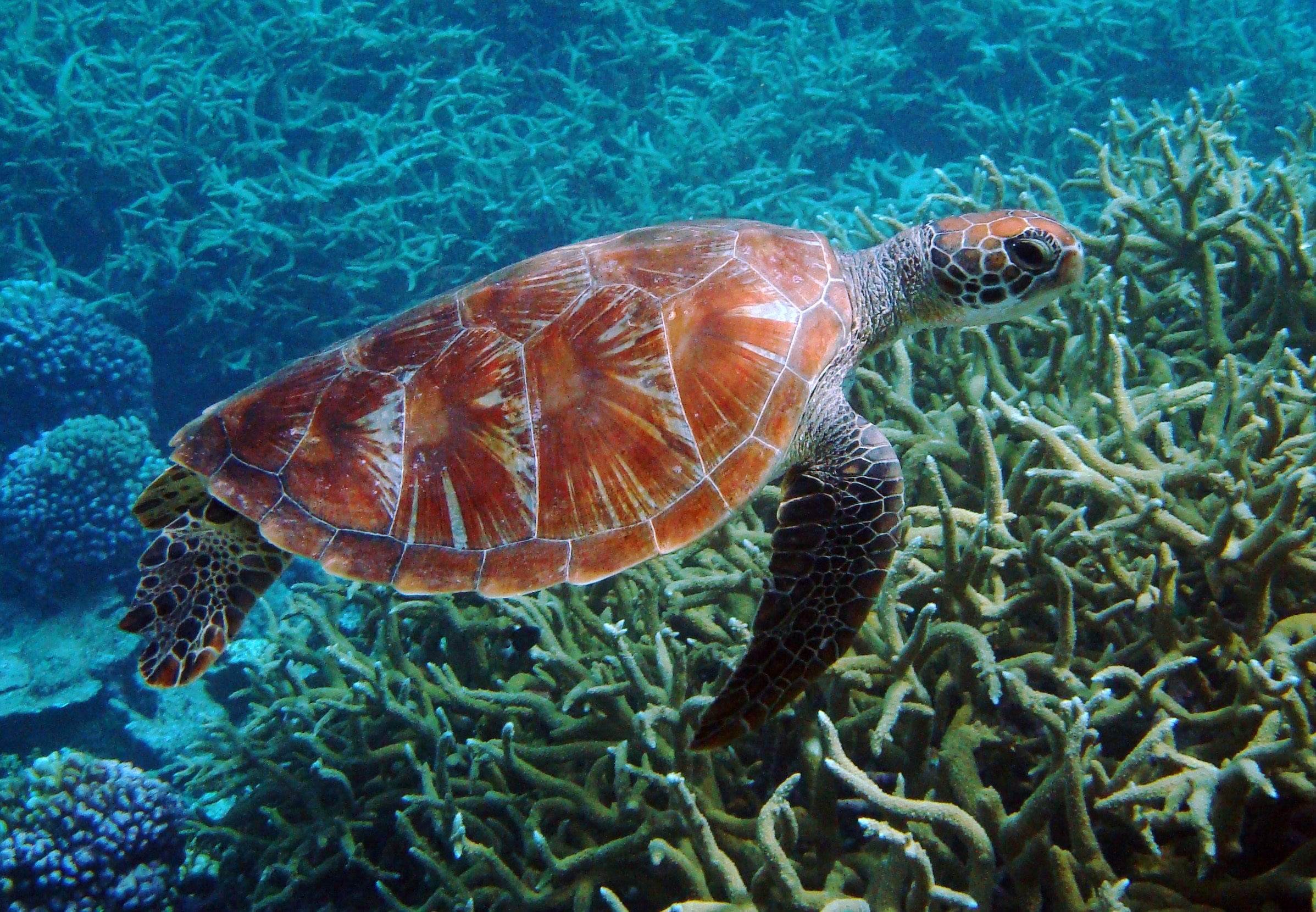
Green sea turtle at Palmyra Atoll National Wildlife Refuge

On January 18, 2001, Secretary of the Interior Bruce Babbitt issued Secretary's Order No. 3224 designating Palmyra's tidal lands, submerged lands and surrounding waters out to 12 nautical miles (22 km) from the water's edge as a National Wildlife Refuge. Subsequently, the Department of the Interior published a regulation providing for the management of the refuge. 66 Fed. Reg. 7660-01 (January 24, 2001). The pertinent part of the regulation states:

We will close the refuge to commercial fishing but will permit a low level of compatible recreational fishing for bonefishing and deep water sportfishing under programs that we will carefully manage to ensure compatibility with refuge purposes. ... Management actions will include protection of the refuge waters and wildlife from commercial fishing activities.

In March 2003, TNC conveyed 416 acres (1.68 km^{2}) of the emergent land of Palmyra to the United States to be included in the refuge. In 2005, it added 28 acres to the conveyance. TNC and Henry Ernest Cooper's descendants kept their remaining private land tracts.

Coral reef at Palmyra Atoll National Wildlife Refuge

The conveyance to TNC from the Fullard-Leos in 2000 was subject to a preexisting commercial fishing license. Then, in 2001, the Secretary of the Interior banned commercial fishing near Palmyra but allowed sport fishing, as quoted above. In January 2007, the commercial fishing licensees sued the United States in the Court of Federal Claims alleging that, under the Takings Clause, the Interior Department regulation had "directly confiscated, taken, and rendered wholly and completely worthless" their purported property interests. The United States moved to dismiss the lawsuit, and the court granted the motion. On April 9, 2009, the court's decision was affirmed by the Court of Appeals for the Federal Circuit.

In November 2005, TNC established a new research station on Palmyra to study global warming, coral reefs, invasive species, and other environmental concerns.

The Pacific Remote Islands Marine National Monument, comprising Palmyra Atoll, Baker Island, Howland Island, Jarvis Island, Johnston Atoll, and Kingman Reef, was established on January 6, 2009, by proclamation of President George W. Bush. This national monument extends 50 nautical miles (93 kilometers) offshore and is managed by the U.S. Fish and Wildlife Service and National Oceanic and Atmospheric Administration. In 2025, this grouping of island territories was renamed the Pacific Islands Heritage Marine National Monument.

== Conservation and restoration ==
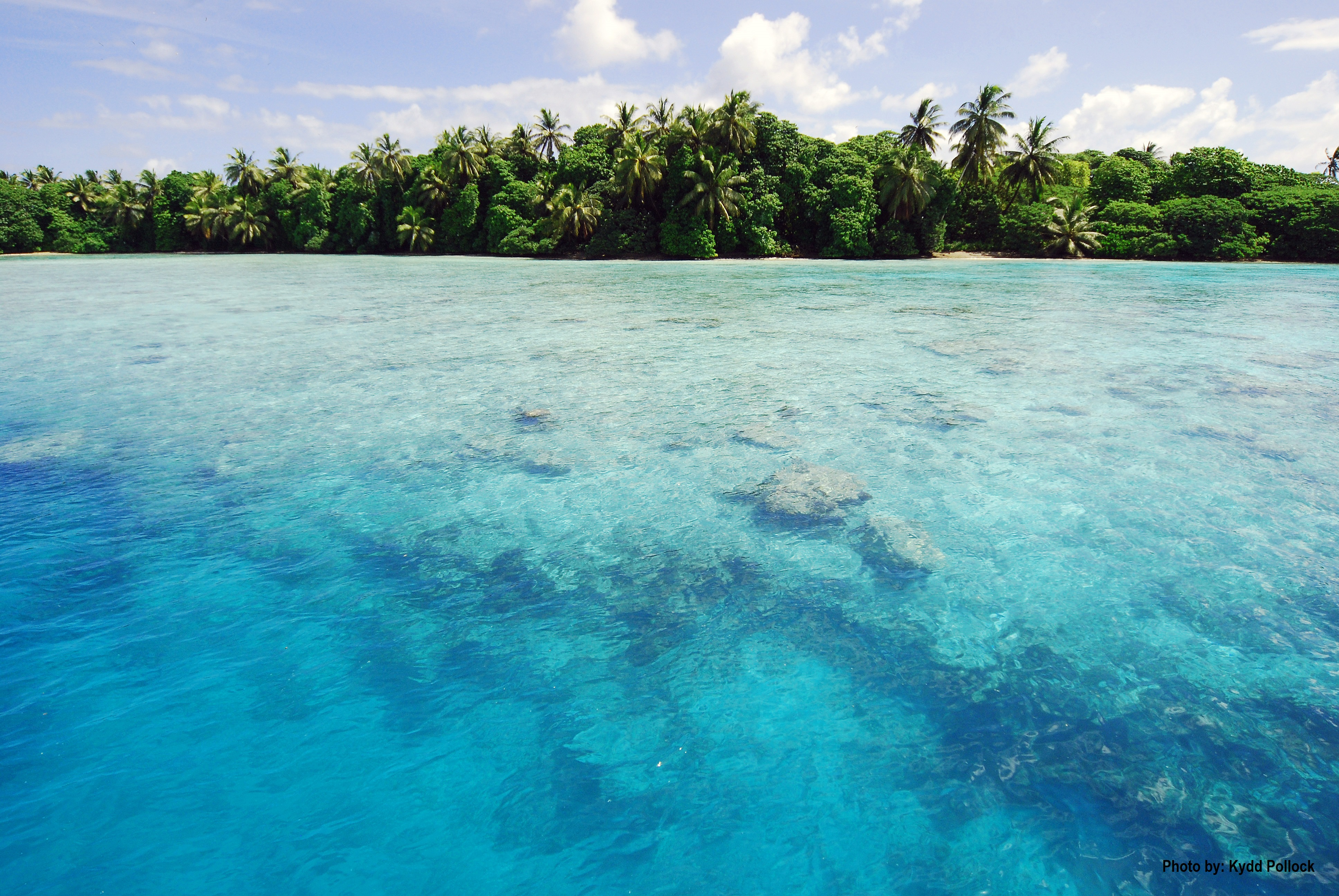
Palmyra

In 2011, Fish and Wildlife Service, the Nature Conservancy, and Island Conservation began an extensive program to eradicate non-native rats that arrived on Palmyra during World War II. As many as 30,000 rats once roamed the atoll, eating the eggs of native seabirds and destroying the seedlings of one of the largest remaining Pacific stands of Pisonia grandis trees. The rats were eliminated in 2012. Later, 51 animal samples representing 15 species of birds, fish, reptiles, and invertebrates were collected for residue analysis during systematic searches or as nontarget mortalities. Residues of brodifacoum (the toxicant employed during the project) were detected in most (84.3%) of the samples analyzed with unknown long-term and sublethal effects. One side effect was the demise of the island's population of Asian tiger mosquitoes. This was claimed to be the first time removal of one unwanted species resulted in the removal of a second. The other mosquito species on the island, Culex quinquefasciatus, prefers to feed on birds and was not affected by the elimination of rats.

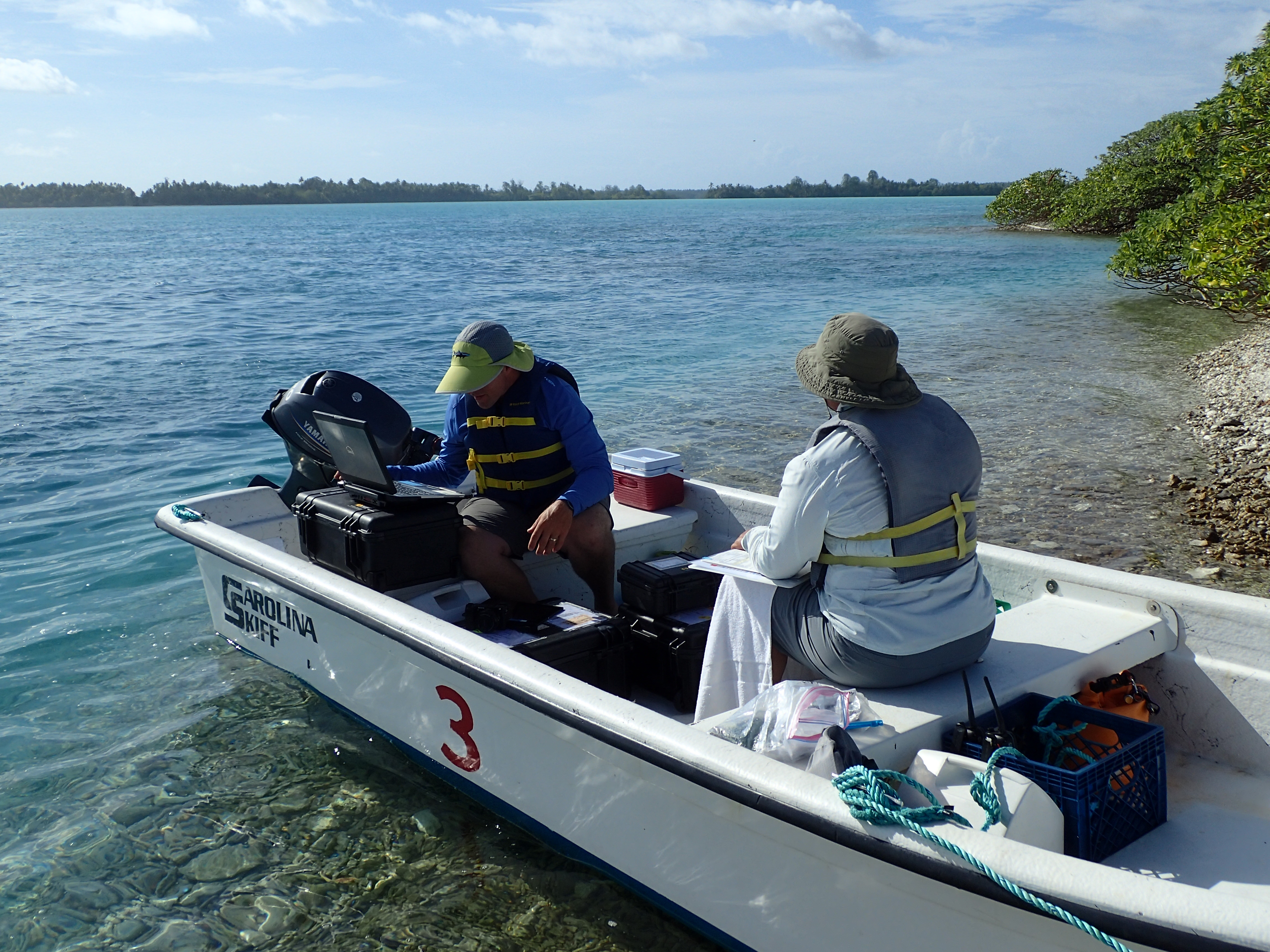
USGS scientists collect data on the lagoon and wildlife.

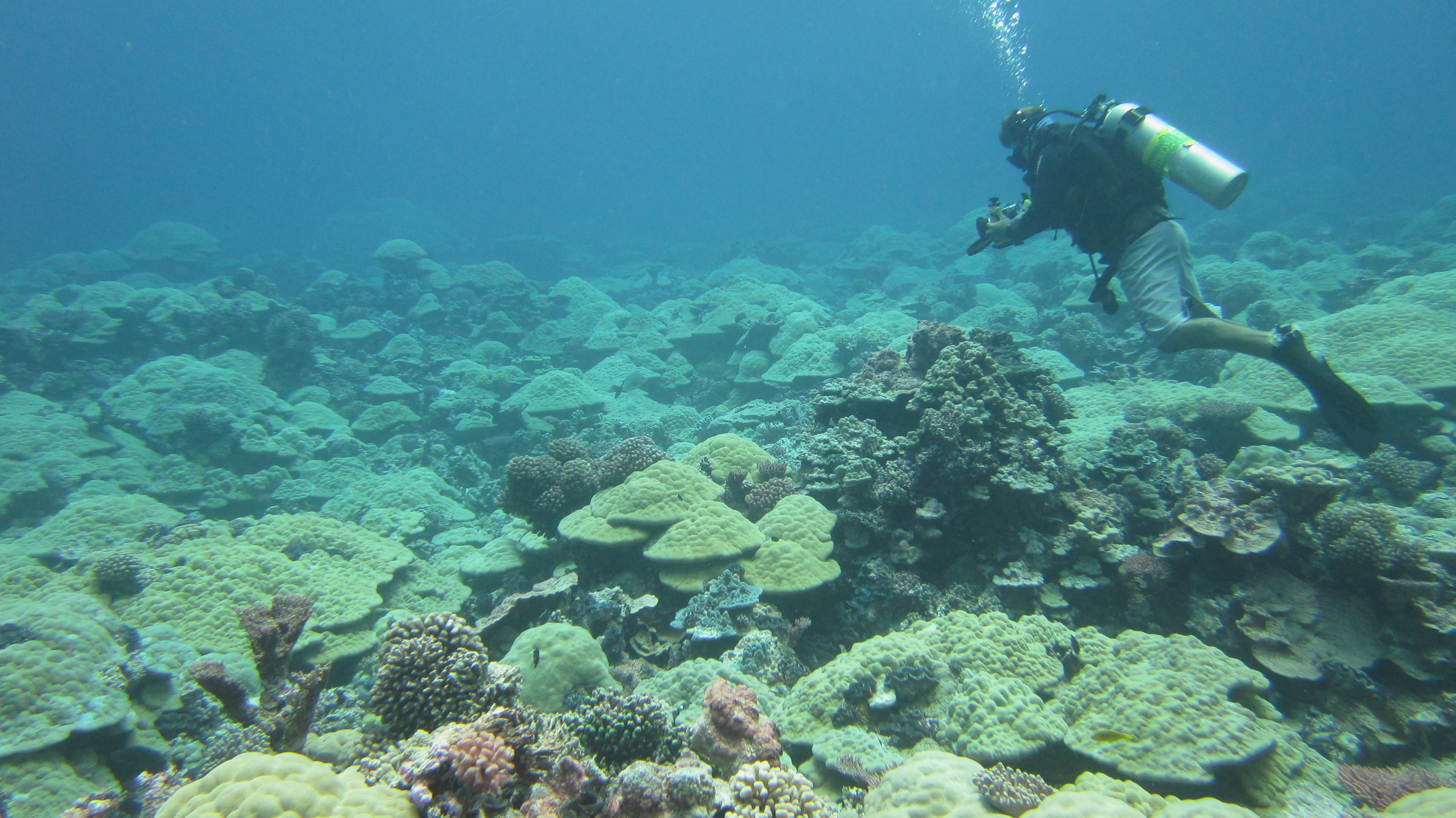
NOAA diver swimming Palmyra reefs

Post-rat-eradication monitoring documented a notable recruitment event for Pisonia grandis, a dominant tree species that is important throughout the Pacific region. However, by five years post-eradication, a 13-fold increase in recruitment of the range-expanding coconut palm Cocos nucifera was found; a subsequent project sought to remove them.

Beginning in 2019, TNC worked in partnership with Island Conservation and the Fish and Wildlife Service to restore the native rainforest at Palmyra Atoll by removing dominant C. nucifera coconut palms, which the conservancy says are the result of former copra plantations and military activity. Other trees provide habitat for 11 seabird species. The conservancy wrote that their re-establishment across the atoll would encourage coral growth and might lessen the local effects of a rise in sea-level. As of December 2019, half a million coconut sprouts had been removed, and the ecosystem's response is being monitored closely.

Due to Palmyra Atoll's location in the Pacific Ocean, where the southern and northern currents meet, trash and debris often wash up on its beaches. Plastic mooring buoys and plastic bottles are plentiful.

The atoll is dominated by the coconut crab, the largest species of terrestrial invertebrate.

To avoid introducing any new invasive species, visitors to the atoll freeze and disinfect their belongings.

In September 2024, the Guam kingfisher, a bird species living only in captivity since the 1980s, was introduced to Palmyra.

== Tourism ==
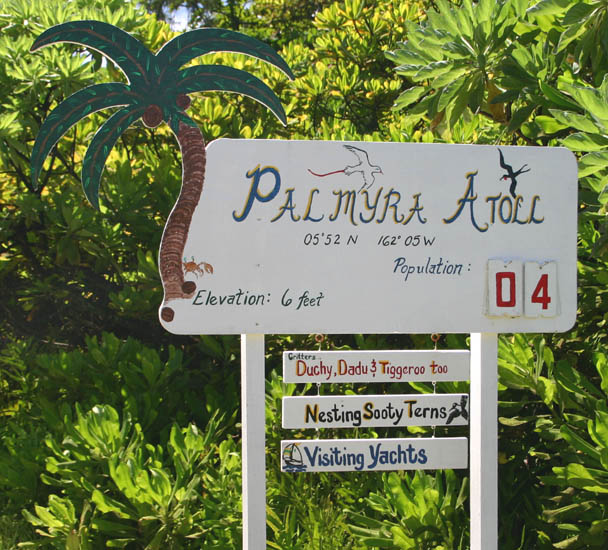
Welcome sign for Palmyra Atoll, June 2005

Tourists can visit Palmyra Atoll (unlike most of the U.S. minor outlying islands, which are closed to the public), though few do, due to the difficulty of accessing it. Visitors must obtain prior approval from the U.S. Fish and Wildlife Service or the Nature Conservancy. A statement by the U.S. Fish and Wildlife Service states as follows:

Public access to Palmyra Atoll is self-limiting due to the very high expense of traveling to such a remote destination. The Nature Conservancy owns and operates the only airplane runway on Palmyra, and by boat it's a 5–7 day sailing trip from Honolulu. There are four ways the public may gain access to the refuge: (1) Working for, contracting with, or volunteering for The Nature Conservancy or Fish and Wildlife Service; (2) Conducting scientific research via Fish and Wildlife Service Special Use Permits; (3) Invitation through The Nature Conservancy sponsored donor trip; (4) Visitation by private recreational sailboat or motorboat.

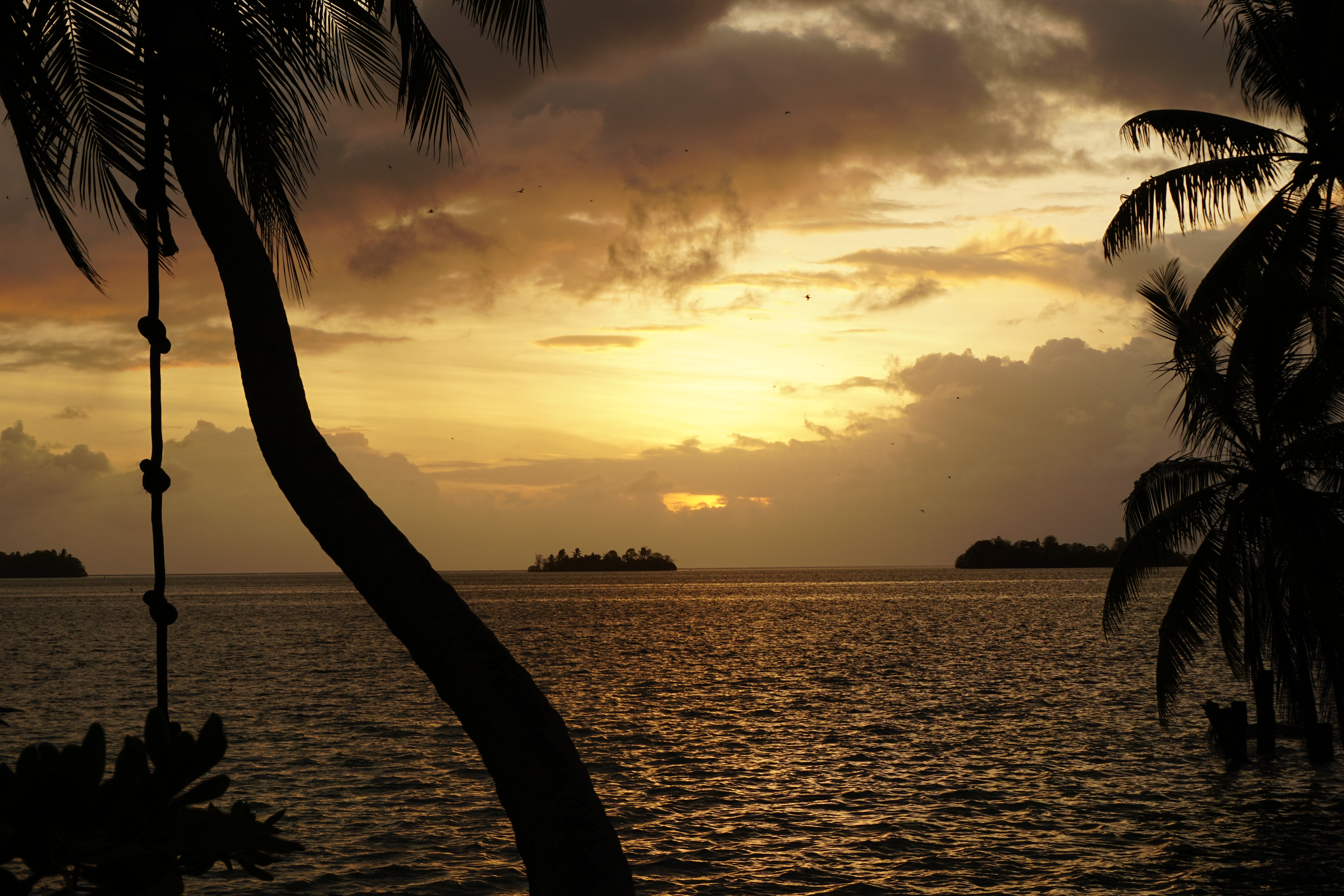
Palmyra sunset

=== Amateur radio (DX) visitors ===
Since the 1940s, Palmyra's most consistent visitors have been members of distance expedition (DX) teams, as the atoll is a popular spot for these amateur radio operators. More than 25 expeditions have arrived. Once on the islands, operators set up radios and antennas and make as many two-way radio contacts with other operators as possible. Former N. California DX Club president Richard Malcolm Crouch became a Palmyra landowner.

In June 1974, the KP6PA DXpedition team helped rescue a couple whose ship had run aground on the reefs. The man, Buck Walker, was later convicted of homicide in the much-publicized Sea Wind murder case.

In 1980, two members of the visiting team were injured severely enough to need an airlift back to Honolulu. The first incident resulted from injuries sustained in a plane crash, as the pilot underestimated wind conditions and the poor state of the landing strip. The second injury, to a surgeon, happened when he fell and cut his hands on broken glass. The surgeon then sued the atoll's owners, as he could no longer practice surgery, and the atoll was closed to visitors for most of the 1980s while cleanup activities were undertaken.

== See also ==
- List of Guano Island claims
- Naval Base Samoa
- Palmyra (disambiguation)
