= KP6PA Palmyra Atoll DXpedition =

Amateur radio DXpedition to Palmyra Atoll

- Location of Palmyra Atoll

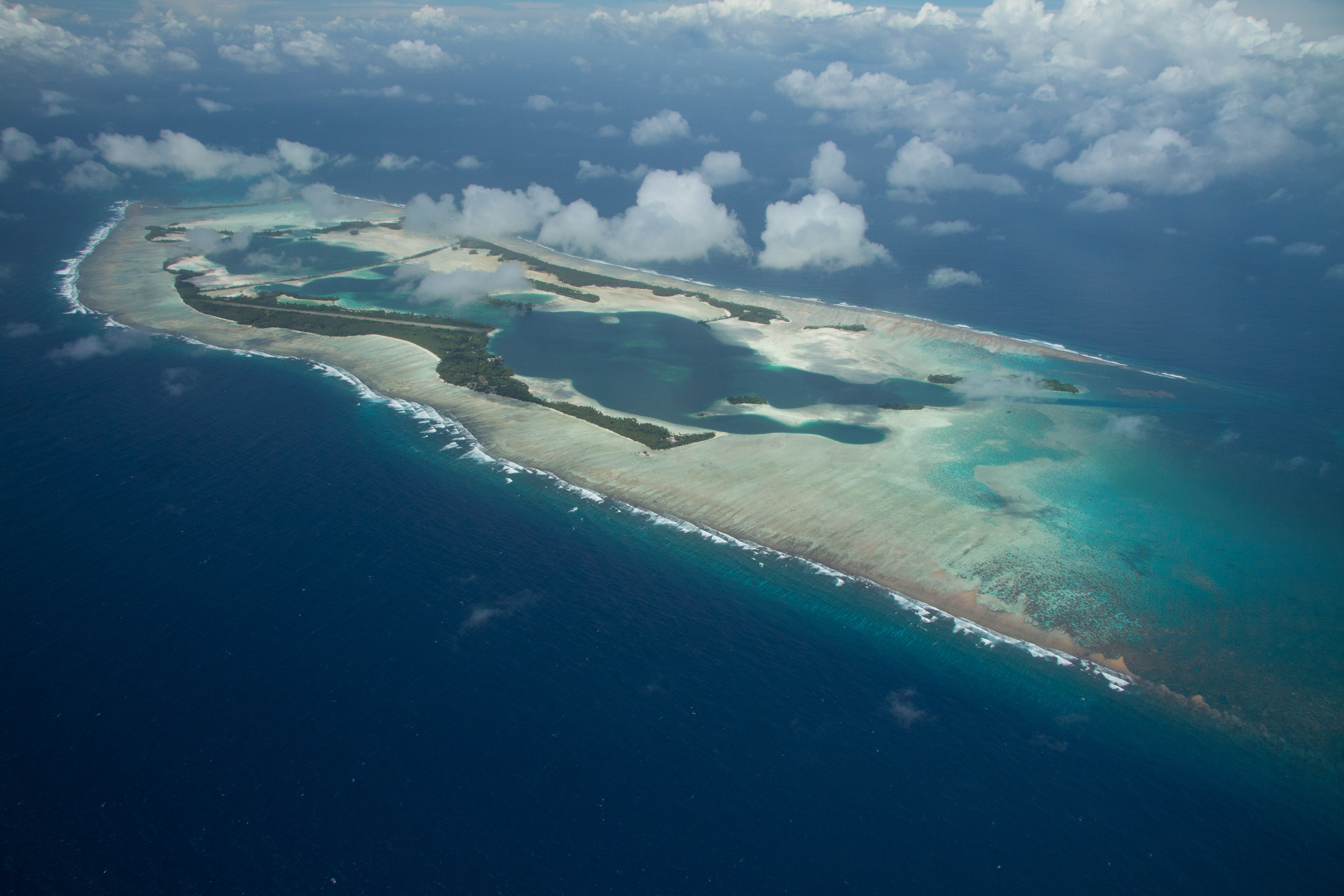
- Palmyra Atoll
- Dates operated: June and July 1974
- Bands operated: 10m-160m
- Modes used: CW, SSB
- Number of contacts: 6235
- Number of operators: 4

The KP6PA Palmyra Atoll DXpedition was an amateur radio expedition that took place in June and July 1974. The team operated two Yaesu FT-101B transceivers, and was able to make approximately 6235 confirmed contacts using Morse code and SSB voice.

During the activation of Palmyra Atoll, the team helped rescue Duane "Buck" Walker and his girlfriend, Stephanie Stearns, who had run aground on a reef due to an inoperable engine. Due to tensions with Walker, the expedition was ended a day early, and the team left for Kingman Reef. After the team left, Walker murdered Mac and Muff Graham, who had anchored at the atoll, and stole their boat, the Sea Wind. Walker was convicted of murder in 1985, and a book about the Sea Wind murders would become a bestseller.
