= And the Sea Will Tell =

1991 book by Vincent Bugliosi

- First edition published by W. W. Norton & Co. (1991)
- Author: Vincent Bugliosi and Bruce Henderson
- Language: English
- Genre: True crime
- Publisher: W. W. Norton & Company
- Publication date: 1991
- Publication place: United States
- Media type: Print

And the Sea Will Tell is a true crime book by Vincent Bugliosi and Bruce Henderson. The nonfiction book recounts an apparent double murder on Palmyra Atoll although only one body was ever found; the subsequent arrest, trial, and conviction of Wesley G. "Buck Duane" Walker; and the acquittal of his girlfriend, Stephanie Stearns, whom Bugliosi and Leonard Weinglass had defended. The book went to No. 1 on The New York Times hardcover bestseller list in March 1991 and is still in print as a trade paperback and ebook.

== Background and theft trial ==
In 1974, a wealthy couple from San Diego, California, Malcolm "Mac" Graham III, 43, and Eleanor LaVerne "Muff" Graham, 40, sailed their 38-foot ketch, Sea Wind, to Palmyra Atoll — 1,200 miles south of Honolulu — hoping to find it deserted and to spend a year or more there. They found other sailors already there, including two male Canadian scientists, but nonetheless stayed.

Also on Palmyra were Wesley G. Walker (a.k.a. "Buck Duane Walker") and Stephanie Stearns (referred to as "Jennifer Jenkins" in the book), who had sailed there together from Hawaii on Stearns's sailing vessel Iola, a deteriorating, patched-together wooden sloop that lacked a reliable auxiliary engine. The Iola was grounded on its approach to the atoll and was dug out by visiting ham radio operators on the KP6PA Palmyra Atoll DXpedition. Bugliosi emphasizes that Stearns was an inexperienced navigator and that it was remarkable that she managed to find the atoll. In contrast, the Grahams' ketch, the Sea Wind, was beautifully finished and impeccably outfitted, with an onboard machine shop equipped with a lathe and acetylene welding torch.

Walker was an ex-convict fleeing a drug possession charge and had come up with the idea of growing cannabis on Palmyra to support himself. The Grahams were a happily married couple touring the world, and Mr. Graham ran his business remotely. The Grahams had brought more than a year's supply of food for their voyage, but Walker and Stearns quickly consumed their own meager supplies and resorted to harvesting the island's few coconuts, often by chopping down entire trees, leaving scars on the island habitat. As Walker's method of farming became unsustainable, he and Stearns were forced to plan a voyage in the rickety Iola, against prevailing winds and currents, to Fanning (Tabuaeran), a nearby atoll in Kiribati, to restock — a voyage close to impossible without a working auxiliary engine.

Eventually the other visitors (aside from the Grahams) left, leaving only the two couples on the atoll. According to Stearns, the Grahams disappeared sometime between August 28 and August 30, 1974, and the young couple found the Grahams' Zodiac rigid inflatable dinghy upside down. On September 11, 1974, after days of searching and waiting for the Grahams to return to their boat, Stearns said she and Walker scuttled the Iola and sailed for Hawaii on the Sea Wind. Once in Hawaii, the couple had the Sea Wind repainted and also renamed it, which according to boating superstition brings bad luck. This act aroused suspicion; an acquaintance of the Grahams recognized the distinctive Sea Wind despite its new paint job. Stearns was arrested in the lower level of the Hawaii Yacht Club for the theft of the Sea Wind, but Walker was able to temporarily escape by using a motorized dinghy to race up the "400 row" of the Ala Wai Harbor. It was believed he fled on foot after leaving the dinghy at the loading dock near the Ilikai Hotel. He was captured soon after. Stearns received a two-year sentence for the theft and Walker a ten-year sentence for the theft (to run concurrently with his 5-year sentence for selling ecstasy). They were not charged in the Grahams' disappearance at that time.

== Murder trial and sentencing ==
In January 1981, a South African couple visiting Palmyra found a human skull and other bones apparently washed up on the beach after a storm. The skull was identified via dental records as Eleanor Graham's. Forensic authorities concluded that Graham had been either shot or bludgeoned to death, dismembered, "burned with an acetylene torch," and placed in a WWII-era aluminum storage container which was then "wired shut" and dumped into the lagoon. Malcolm Graham's body was never found.

Meanwhile, in July 1979, Walker had escaped from the federal prison on McNeil Island in Washington State. He was recaptured in late 1981, in Arizona, and had his existing sentence lengthened by five years for the escape.

Walker was tried and convicted of Eleanor Graham's murder. He was incarcerated at United States Penitentiary, Victorville, in California. Although Walker never testified, the defense claimed that he and Stearns were attempting to return the Sea Wind to Hawaii with the Iola in tow, but the Iola ran aground on the reef as they exited the lagoon and had to be abandoned. During the voyage back to Hawaii, the defense claimed, a large swordfish damaged the Sea Wind's hull below the waterline, necessitating her repair and subsequent repainting and renaming.

Stephanie Stearns was tried separately in the United States District Court for the Northern District of California in San Francisco. After Bugliosi argued that Walker had committed the Palmyra murders himself without Stearns's participation or knowledge, and following her testimony at the trial, the jury returned a verdict of not guilty. Bugliosi spends much of the book emphasizing the complexity of his legal work on the case and his surprise at Stearns's lack of gratitude after the verdict.

== Aftermath ==
The book was adapted into the 1991 television film And the Sea Will Tell, directed by Tommy Lee Wallace, which aired on CBS as a 4-hour film. Part 1 aired on February 24, and Part 2 was aired two days later.

The trial lawyer who represented Walker, Earle Partington, sued Bugliosi for defamation, claiming that both the book and the docudrama portrayed Partington in a negative light. The court found for Bugliosi, ruling that this was his protected opinion.

Walker was released on parole in September 2007 at the age of 69, after serving 22 years of a life sentence, and died of a stroke on April 26, 2010, at the age of 72. Prior to his death, Walker had been living in a trailer home in Willits, California. Walker (writing as Wesley G. Walker) claimed in a book about the case that he had been seduced by Mrs. Graham and, in the midst of sex, had been caught by Mr. Graham, who shot his wife and attempted to shoot Walker. Malcolm Graham's body has never been found.
