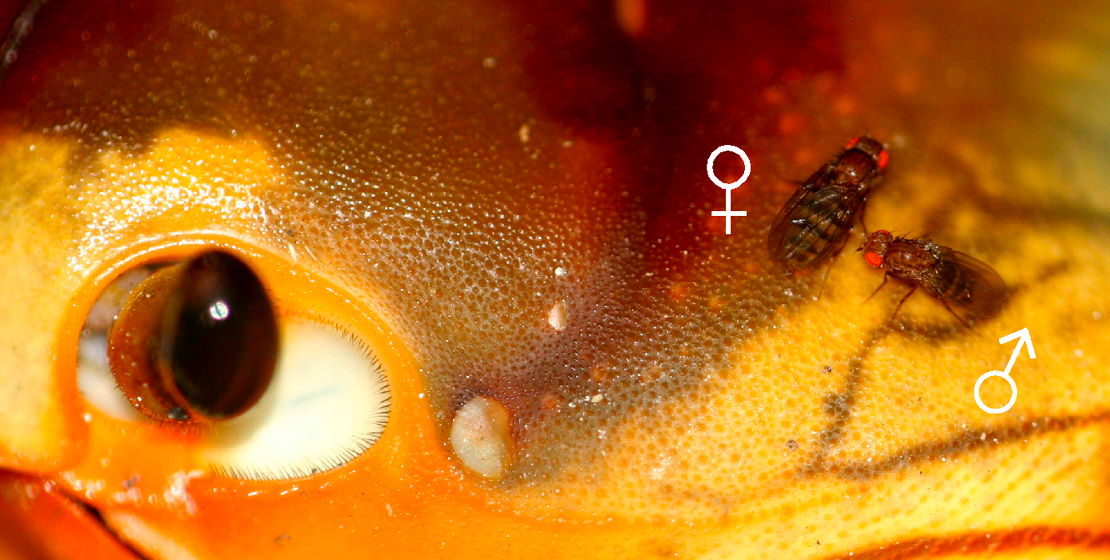
- A pair of Drosophila endobranchiae on the crab Gecarcinus ruricola

Scientific classification
- Kingdom: Animalia
- Phylum: Arthropoda
- Class: Insecta
- Order: Diptera
- Family: Drosophilidae
- Genus: Drosophila
- Species: D. endobranchia

Binomial name
- Drosophila endobranchia Carson & Wheeler, 1968

= Drosophila endobranchia =

Species of fly

Drosophila endobranchia is a species of fly in the family Drosophilidae. The species, which is endemic to Grand Cayman, was discovered in 1966 and not found again until 2007, when it was rediscovered in the mouth region of a land crab.

== Habitat ==
Like most drosophilid flies, D. endobranchia feeds on microbes. Peculiarly, this and two other species have colonized land crabs. While the Christmas Island fly Lissocephala powelli lives on both true crabs and Anomura (for example Birgus latro, the robber crab), D. endobranchia and the closely related D. carcinophila live on gecarcinid crabs (also true crabs) such as the black Gecarcinus ruricola and the red G. lateralis. D. endobranchia prefers G. ruricola. One reason could be that G. lateralis digs its own burrows, which could lead to problems for the flies living on its surface.

== Biology ==
D. endobranchia is closely associated with its crab host, with one to six flies found per infected crab. Adults hardly move at all, let alone fly, and are extremely reluctant to leave their fast-paced host. Courting and mating take place on the crab, and territories are defended between males. The eggs are placed around the crab's eyes. The hatched larvae migrate to the nephric pads and feed on microbes responsible for cleansing urine from nitrogenous compounds. From the second instar on, the larvae migrate to the gill chamber, where they stay up to several months. At the third instar they return to the mouth parts where they form a halo around the mouth opening. They later fall to the ground to pupate.

At least three quarters of adult D. endobranchia found on land crabs were males. It is not clear whether this species has a skewed sex ratio, or whether females only visit crabs, or frequently switch host crabs.

Host crabs are found using olfactory cues, but the substance or substances responsible for this are not known.

== Conservation ==
Habitat destruction and hunting pose a threat to the long-term survival of black crabs on Grand Cayman, and thus also to their fly guests. It has therefore been proposed to classify host and guest as vulnerable.
