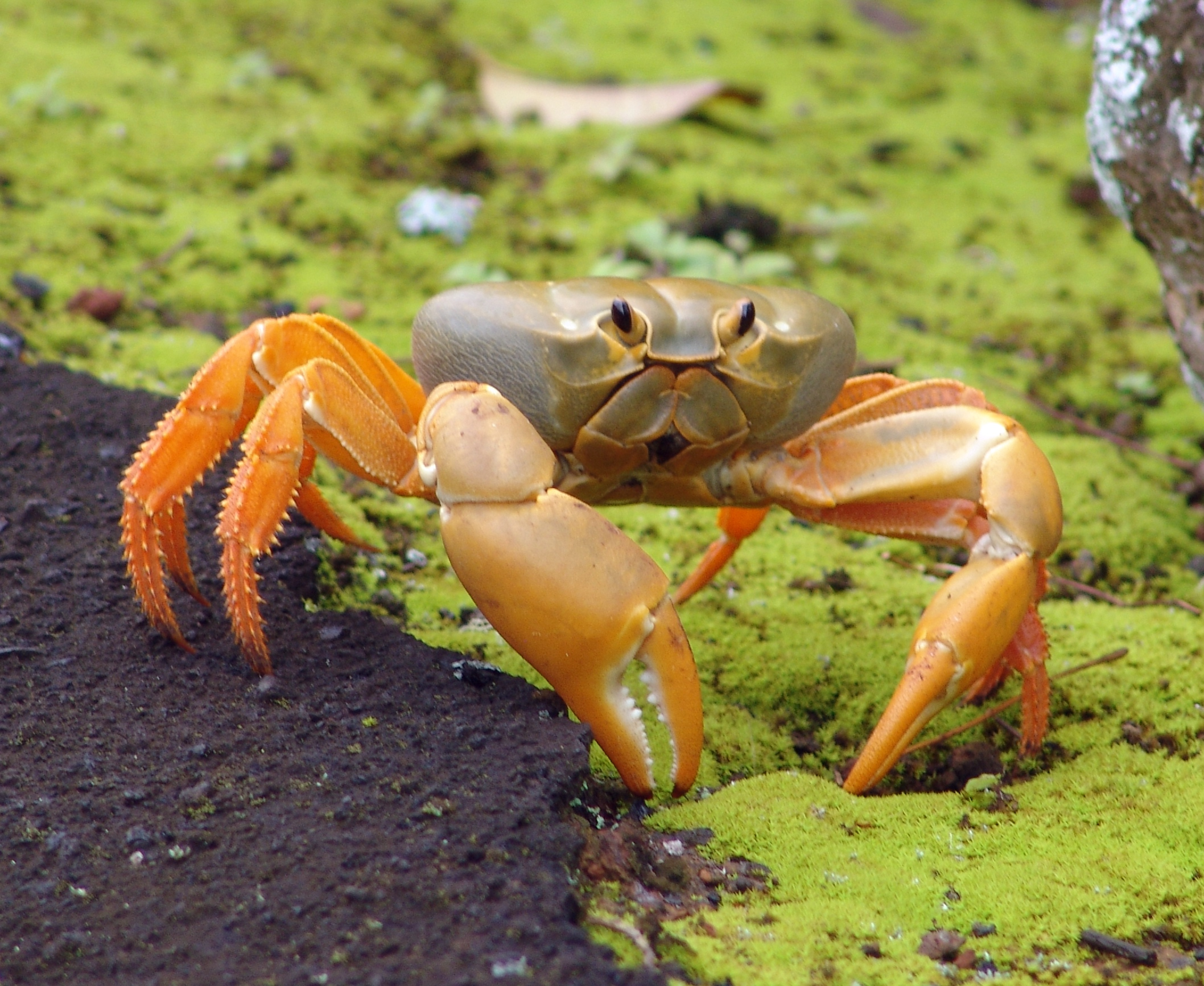
- Yellow morph of J. lagostoma
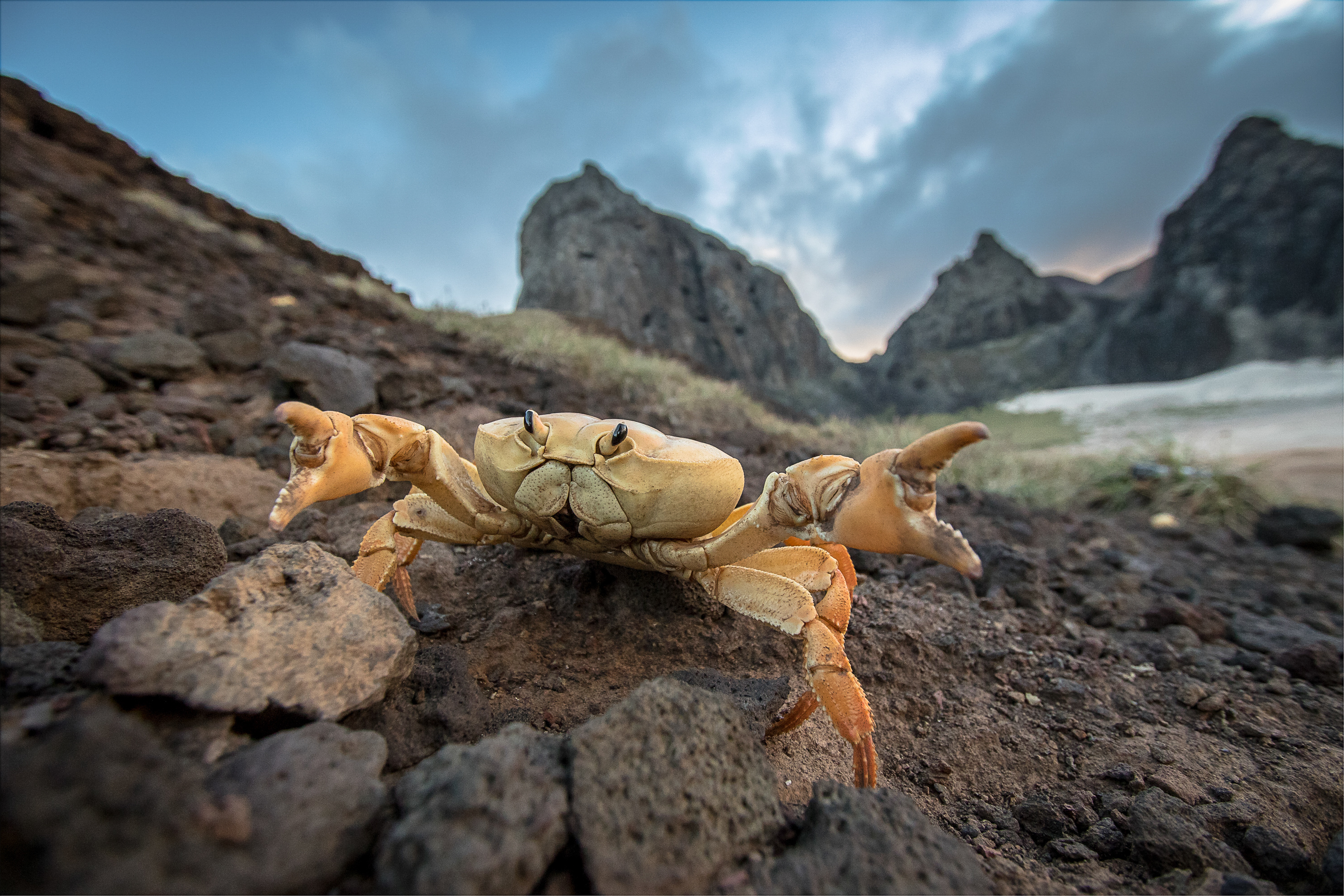
- Yellow morph on Trindade

Scientific classification
- Kingdom: Animalia
- Phylum: Arthropoda
- Clade: Pancrustacea
- Class: Malacostraca
- Order: Decapoda
- Suborder: Pleocyemata
- Infraorder: Brachyura
- Family: Gecarcinidae
- Genus: Johngarthia
- Species: J. lagostoma

Binomial name
- Johngarthia lagostoma (H. Milne-Edwards, 1837)

Synonyms
- Gecarcinus lagostoma H. Milne-Edwards, 1837

= Johngarthia lagostoma =

Species of crab

Johngarthia lagostoma is a species of terrestrial crab that lives on Ascension Island and three other islands in the South Atlantic. It grows to a carapace width of 110 mm (4.3 in) on Ascension Island, where it is the largest native land animal. It exists in two distinct colour morphs, one yellow and one purple, with few intermediates. The yellow morph dominates on Ascension Island, while the purple morph is more frequent on Rocas Atoll. The species differs from other Johngarthia species by the form of the third maxilliped.

Johngarthia lagostoma lives in burrows among vegetation, at altitudes of up to 400 m (1,300 ft), emerging at night to feed on plant matter and occasionally on animals. From January to March there is an annual migration to the sea to release the planktonic larvae. The species was first described (as Gecarcinus lagostoma) by Henri Milne-Edwards in 1837 from material sent to him by the naturalists Jean René Constant Quoy and Joseph Paul Gaimard, collected by the French ship Astrolabe.

== Distribution and biogeography ==
Johngarthia lagostoma is found on Ascension Island, Trindade Island, Fernando de Noronha and the Rocas Atoll. On Ascension Island, J. lagostoma is restricted outside the breeding season to the slopes of Green Mountain, where there is sufficient moisture and vegetation, the rest of the island being too arid for the crab to survive. All the land above 400 metres (1,300 ft) is suitable habitat for the crabs, as is much of the land above 200 m (660 ft). They are occasionally found at lower altitudes, including the well-watered gardens of Georgetown, and the sooty tern breeding colony in the south-west of the island (known as the Wideawake Fairs). On Trindade Island, J. lagostoma is abundant wherever plants grow, including the highest parts of the island.

The geographic distribution of J. lagostoma across a small number of islands in the southern Atlantic Ocean is very unusual, and difficult to explain by planktonic dispersal. Its nearest relatives are the other species of Johngarthia, two of which (J. malpilensis and J. planata) inhabit islands in the Pacific Ocean off Central America, and one (J. weileri) is found on islands in the Gulf of Guinea. Some authors have suggested the existence of former islands, now submerged, which could have acted as "stepping stones" for the colonisation of Ascension Island; the isolation of Ascension Island from any other land mass makes transportation of either larvae or adults difficult.

== Description ==
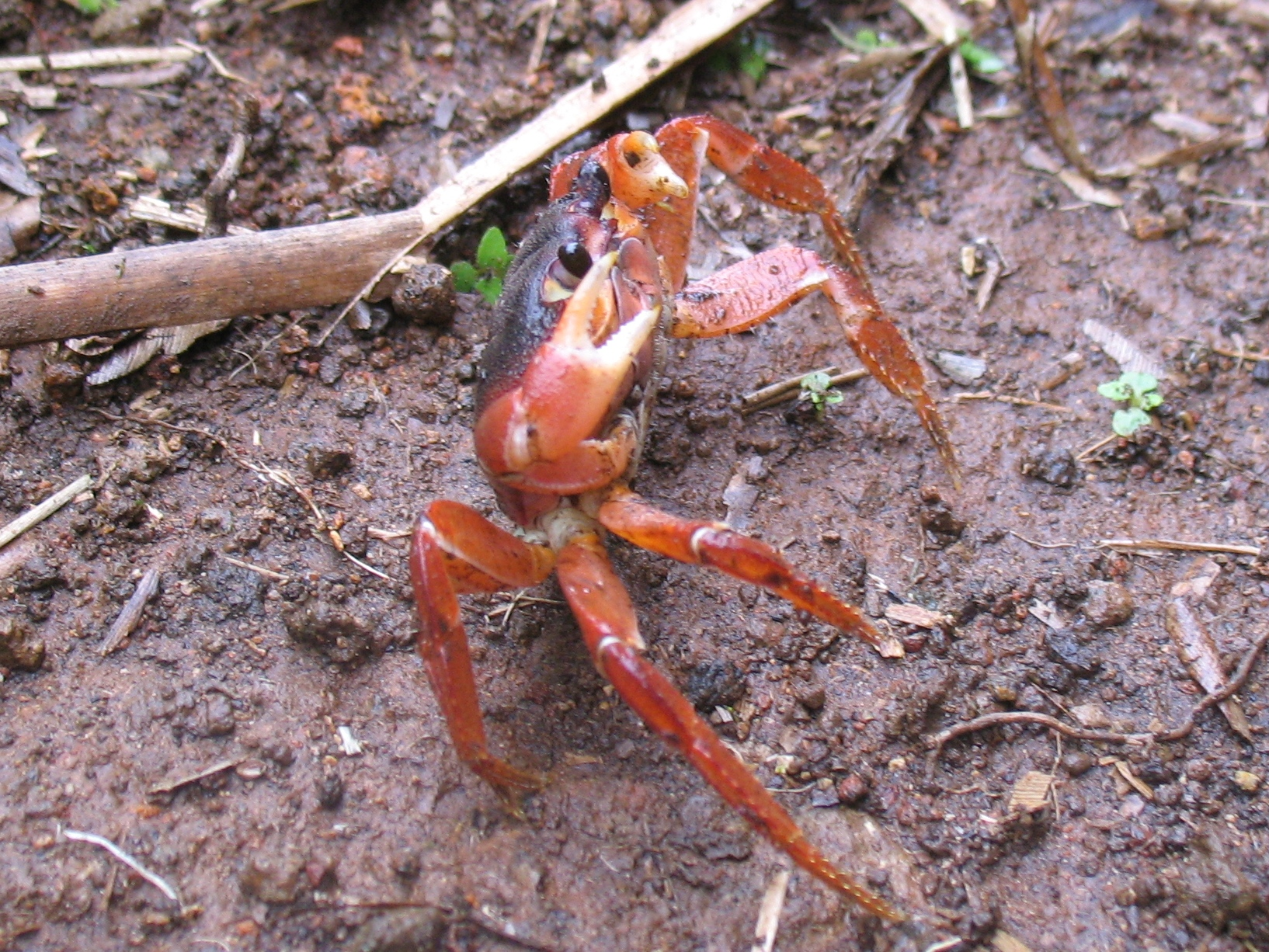
Purple morph of J. lagostoma on Green Mountain, Ascension Island

Mature specimens of J. lagostoma are typically 70–110 millimetres (2.8–4.3 in) wide across the carapace on Ascension Island; individuals from the Rocas Atoll are somewhat smaller. In the family Gecarcinidae, species are normally separated by the form of the first pleopod (gonopod), which is used by males during mating, but there is no difference in the gonopod between J. lagostoma and J. planata. Instead, J. lagostoma differs from other species in the genus by the form of the third maxilliped; it has a fissure which is a narrow slit, but which gapes open in other species. The third maxilliped is also larger, covering the epistome and the antennules in J. lagostoma but not in other species.

Within the species, two distinct colour morphs can be seen. The "yellow" morph has a bright yellow or orange exoskeleton, with white patches on the underside of the walking legs and claws. The "purple" morph has a dark purple exoskeleton, but with the same white patches as on the yellow morph. A few intermediate individuals occur, which are predominantly yellow, but with purple patches on the carapace. On Ascension Island, the yellow morph is the more frequent one, while on the Rocas Atoll, the distribution is more equal. Darker individuals are thought to be better concealed from predators, but more prone to heat stress during long migrations; The Rocas Atoll is much smaller than Ascension Island, and the migration routes are therefore shorter, which may explain the difference in frequency of the two morphs.

Mitochondrial DNA analyses have found evidence of genetic discontinuity among J. lagostoma, identifying three genetically distinct groups: Rocas Atoll and Fernando de Noronha; Ascension Island; and Trindade Island. Despite this, there is phenotypic similarity across all three populations, likely due to stabilizing selection and the retention of ancestral polymorphism.

== Ecology and conservation ==
Before Ascension Island was colonised by Europeans in the 19th century, Johngarthia lagostoma was the only large land animal on the island. Since then, many species of mammal have been introduced to Ascension Island, and now compete with J. lagostoma; they include mice, rats and rabbits.

J. lagostoma is active at night and after rain, when it emerges from its burrows, which can be up to 1 metre (3 ft 3 in) deep. In 1915, H. A. Baylis reported that it feeds on "decaying vegetation and perhaps a certain amount of excreta from sea-birds"; most of its diet is thought to be made up of plant matter, but can also include animals. In the Wideawake Fairs, J. lagostoma feeds on chicks and eggs of the sooty tern, and they have been proposed as a limiting factor in the breeding of petrels on Ascension Island. In May, green sea turtles (Chelonia mydas) hatch, and J. lagostoma is one of several predators to target the emerging hatchlings, alongside the Ascension frigatebird (Fregata aquila) and feral cats. The crabs find water on and under rocks, especially after condensation has begun to form on their cool surfaces at night.

In the late nineteenth century, a bounty was levied on J. lagostoma in order to reduce its numbers. Hunters were paid 6 pence (alternatively paid in rum) for every hundred claws collected. In 1879, the total bag for the island comprised 66 cats, 4,013 mice, 7,683 rats and 80,414 land crabs; in the eight years to 1887, bounties were collected on more than 330,000 crabs. The current population is much smaller, and the low level of recruitment and lack of juveniles suggests that the species may become endangered.

== Life cycle ==
Although juvenile and adult J. lagostoma are almost exclusively terrestrial, the larvae are marine and planktonic. In order to release their offspring, the adults therefore have to migrate to the sea, as seen in other land crabs, such as the Christmas Island red crab, Gecarcoidea natalis. In most members of the family Gecarcinidae, migration coincides with the rainy season, which reduces the risk of desiccation; migration in J. lagostoma occurs from January until March, while the period of highest rainfall is from March to May.

The crabs travel approximately 450 m (1,480 ft) per day, and mating can take place anywhere along the route. The proportion of males on the migration therefore decreases as the migration continues. The eggs are larger than in other gecarcinid species and consequently fewer in number; females with a carapace width of 94 mm (3.7 in) had a mean fecundity of 72,000. Spawning occurs in the last quarter of the lunar cycle, during neap tides, on rocky shores.

== Taxonomy and history ==
Johngarthia lagostoma was first described by Henri Milne-Edwards in 1837, under the name Gecarcinus lagostoma. The specific epithet lagostoma means "hare-lip", from the Greek λαγός (lagos, "hare") and στόμα (stoma, "mouth"); Milne-Edwards also named the species in French gécarcin bec-de-lièvre ("hare-lipped land crab"). Milne-Edwards erroneously gave the type locality as "l'Australasie" (Australasia); he had been given the material he used for the description by Jean René Constant Quoy and Joseph Paul Gaimard, who were working on the molluscs collected on the Astrolabe excursion, which had visited Australasia and stopped at Ascension Island in 1829. G. lagostoma was placed in the subgenus Johngarthia by Michael Türkay in 1970, who raised the subgenus to the rank of genus in 1987.

Many subsequent voyages halted at Ascension Island, and many visitors commented on the land crabs they found there, including William Dampier, Charles Darwin and Charles Wyville Thomson. Bernard Stonehouse reported on an expedition by the British Ornithologists' Union to Ascension Island, stating:

We met land crabs, too, and were sadly disappointed. They were small, no larger than an ordinary edible crab, with bloated shells and moderately long pincers. Some were of beetroot purple, others yellow or orange, apparently two colour-phases of the same species. They were shy, freezing with pincers erect when alarmed, usually to be found within a short distance of their burrows and ready to scuttle down at the drop of a hat. In rainy weather they promenaded more freely, sometimes appearing at the side of road with arms waving like diminutive but aggressive hitch-hikers. Fringed mandibles [third maxillipeds] suggest a permanently turned-down mouth, giving them a disgruntled, unhappy expression; they were disagreeable rather than sinister and fell far short of their reputation. The first land crab I met was sitting in a prickly pear bush, sadly munching one of the brilliant red fruits and dribbling juice. I could never take them seriously after that.

This is also likely the species of crab encountered by the Terra Nova Expedition on Trindade. Expedition member Apsley Cherry-Garrard included his notes from their time there in his book, The Worst Journey in the World, describing them staring and circling himself and a few other team members "as if they were waiting for us to die to come and eat us. One big fellow left his place in the circle and waddled up to my feet and examined my boots. First with one claw and then with the other he took a taste of my boot. He went away obviously disgusted: one could almost see him shake his head."

Cherry-Garrard's book also includes a letter from Henry Robertson Bowers, dated Sunday, 31 July (likely 1910), which reads:

"The land-crabs are little short of a nightmare. They peep at you from every nook and boulder. Their dead staring eyes follow your step as if to say, 'If only you will drop down we will do the rest.' To lie down and sleep on any part of the island would be suicidal... One feature that would soon send a lonely man off his chump is that no matter how many are in sight they are all looking at you, and they follow step by step with a sickly deliberation. They are all yellow and pink, and next to spiders seem the most loathsome creatures in God's earth."

The closely related crabs from the islands of the Gulf of Guinea were formerly included in Gecarcinus lagostoma, but are now treated as a separate species, Johngarthia weileri.
