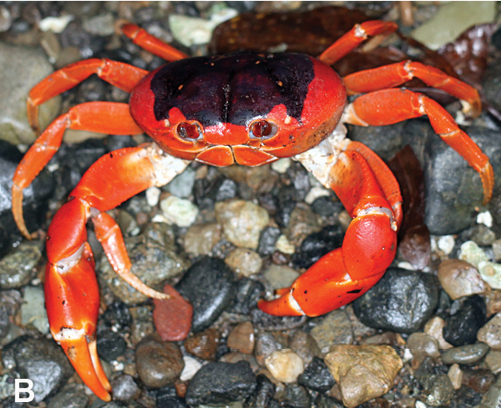
- Male G. nobilii

Scientific classification
- Kingdom: Animalia
- Phylum: Arthropoda
- Class: Malacostraca
- Order: Decapoda
- Suborder: Pleocyemata
- Infraorder: Brachyura
- Family: Gecarcinidae
- Genus: Gecarcinus
- Species: G. nobilii

Binomial name
- Gecarcinus nobilii Perger & Wall, 2014

= Gecarcinus nobilii =

Species of crab

Gecarcinus nobili, also known as the Red land crab, Ghostly moon crab, or Colombian land crab, is a species of land crab closely related to the halloween moon crab (G. quadratus). It was described in 2014. It is from the Neotropical Pacific coast of northwestern South America.

== Range and habitat ==
G. nobilii is found along the South American Pacific coast, from Colombia to Peru. It inhabits the mangrove, tropical rainforest and other habitats that lines the coast.

== Behavior ==
It behaves almost indistinguishably from its relative G. quadratus.
