= Johngarthia cocoensis =

Scientific classification
- Kingdom: Animalia
- Phylum: Arthropoda
- Class: Malacostraca
- Order: Decapoda
- Suborder: Pleocyemata
- Infraorder: Brachyura
- Family: Gecarcinidae
- Genus: Johngarthia
- Species: J. cocoensis

Binomial name
- Johngarthia cocoensis Perger, Vargas & Wall, 2011

Species of crab

Johngarthia cocoensis is a species of crab in the family Gecarcinidae. It is a terrestrial species, and the only crab endemic to Cocos Island. It is a large, ruddy-brown crab, with the juveniles darker in colour.
