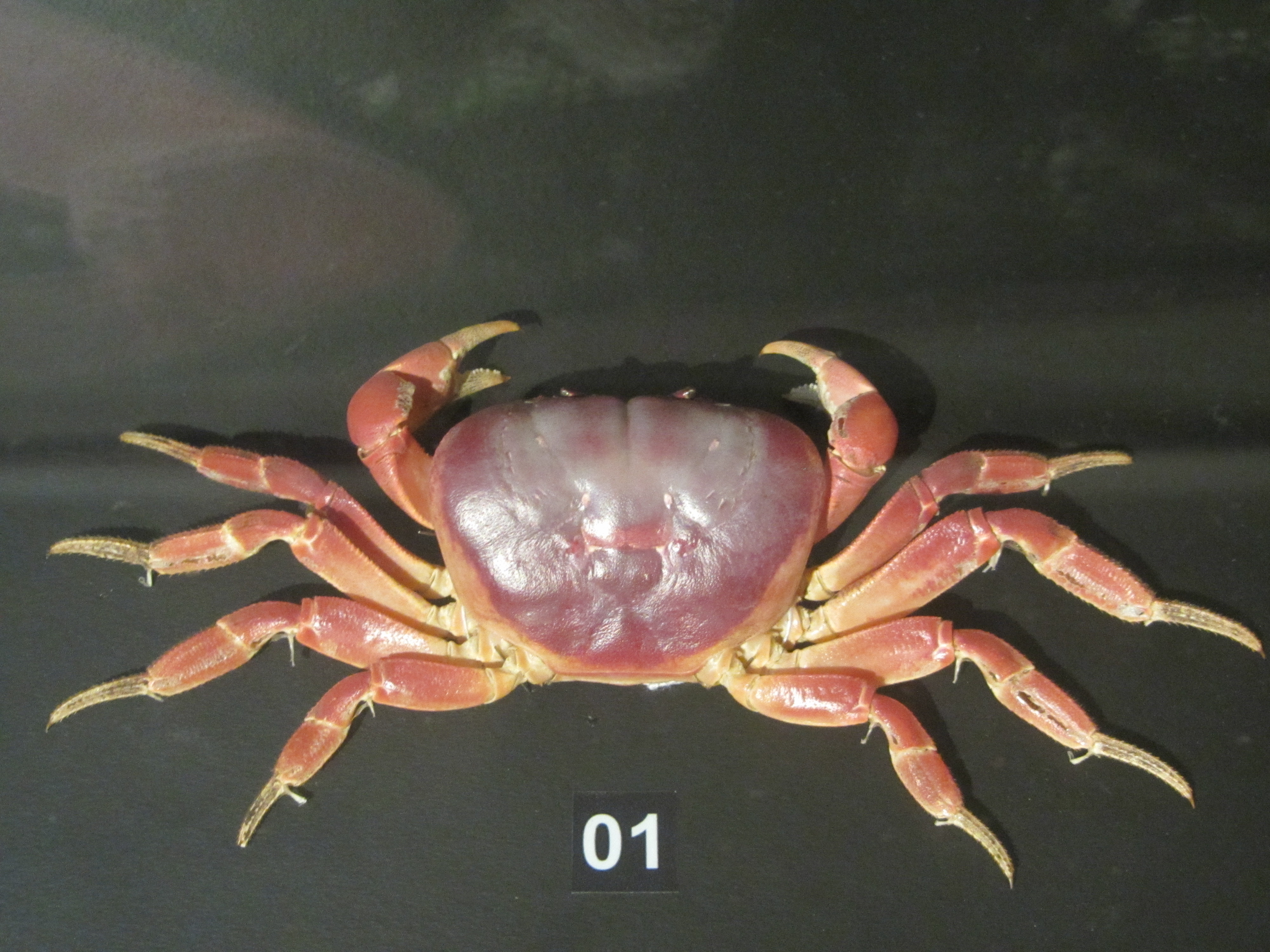

Scientific classification
- Kingdom: Animalia
- Phylum: Arthropoda
- Class: Malacostraca
- Order: Decapoda
- Suborder: Pleocyemata
- Infraorder: Brachyura
- Family: Gecarcinidae
- Genus: Gecarcoidea
- Species: G. lalandii

Binomial name
- Gecarcoidea lalandii H. Milne-Edwards, 1837

= Gecarcoidea lalandii =

Species of crab

Gecarcoidea lalandii is a large species of terrestrial crab. It is dark purple in colour, with long legs and short pincers. It is nocturnal, so spends most of the day hiding in burrows. Compared to the related G. natalis, G. lalandii is relatively widespread, being found in the Indo-Pacific from the Andaman Islands and eastwards. Adults mainly occur in forest, but can sometimes be found in more open habitats. When carrying eggs, females migrate to the coast, where they release the eggs in the tidal zone. Small adults sometimes fall prey to the crab Geograpsus crinipes.
