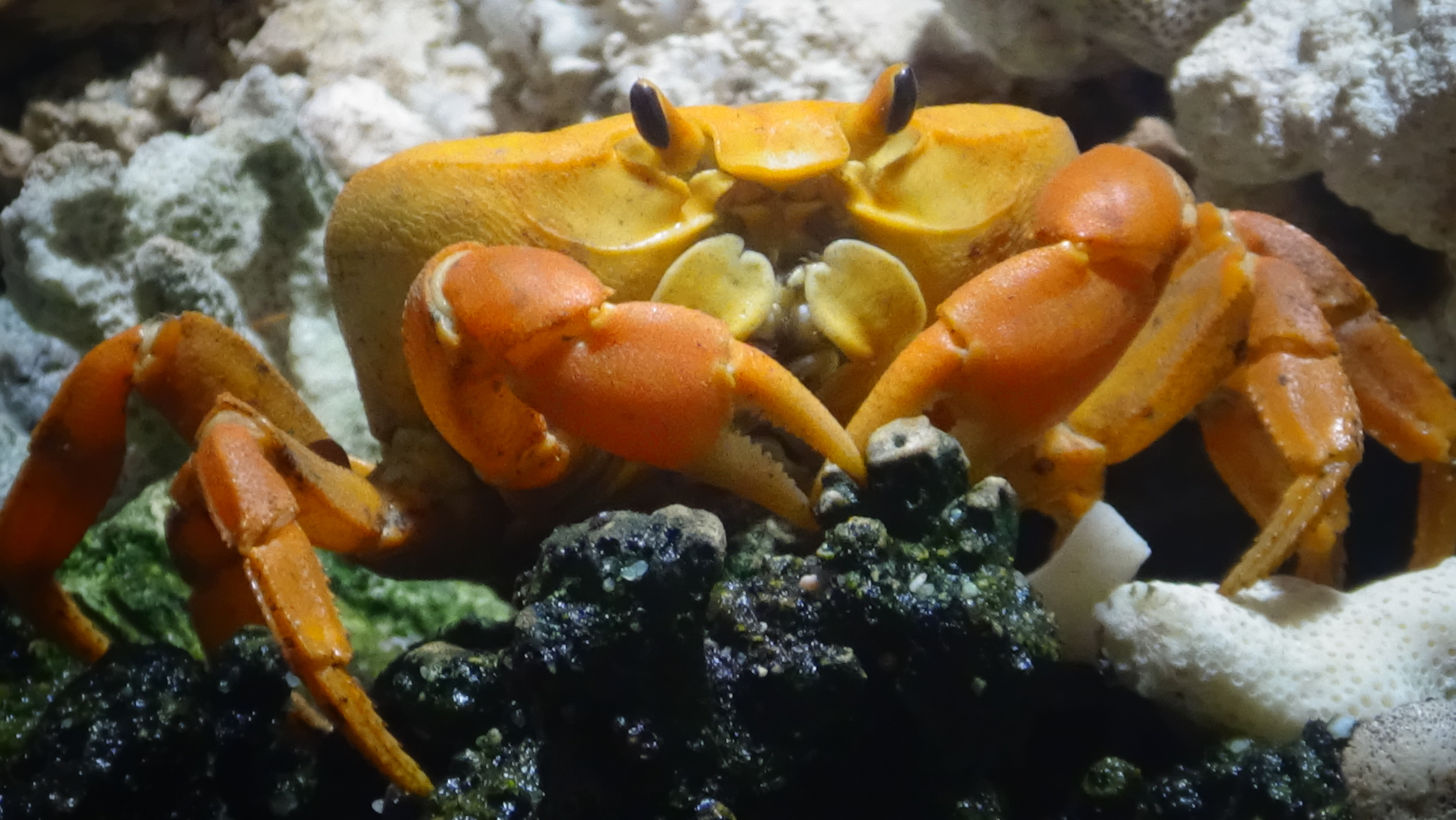

Scientific classification
- Kingdom: Animalia
- Phylum: Arthropoda
- Class: Malacostraca
- Order: Decapoda
- Suborder: Pleocyemata
- Infraorder: Brachyura
- Family: Gecarcinidae
- Genus: Johngarthia
- Species: J. oceanica

Binomial name
- Johngarthia oceanica Perger, 2019

= Johngarthia oceanica =

Species of crab

Johngarthia oceanica, also known as the Clipperton crab, is a bright orange species of land crab that lives on Clipperton Island and on Socorro Island in the Revillagigedo Islands off Mexico in the tropical eastern Pacific. Prior to 2019, J. oceanica was considered a subspecies of J. planata, however, a reexamination determined the land crabs on the oceanic islands to be a separate species. J. oceanica differs from J. planata in the shape of the mesial lobe of the infraorbital margin and the color of its carapace.

Johngarthia oceanica is omnivorous and feeds on seaweed (algae), vegetation and sometimes carrion. It has been observed climbing trees to feast on leaves.

On Clipperton, the introduction of species that prey on the land crabs has had a significant impact on the island's vegetation. The introduction of pigs on Clipperton Island by guano miners in the 1890s reduced the crab population, which allowed grassland to gradually cover about 80 percent of the atoll's land surface. The elimination of these pigs in 1958 caused most of this vegetation to disappear, resulting in the return of millions of crabs. The introduction of ship rats from shipwrecks on the island in the late 20th/early 21st century has led to a decline in the crab population, causing a corresponding increase in both vegetation and coconut palms.

Studies of predation upon land crabs on Socorro Island found that the crabs make up a significant portion of the yellow-crowned night herons's diet. Predation by red-tailed hawks and, to a limited degree, feral cats was also noted.
