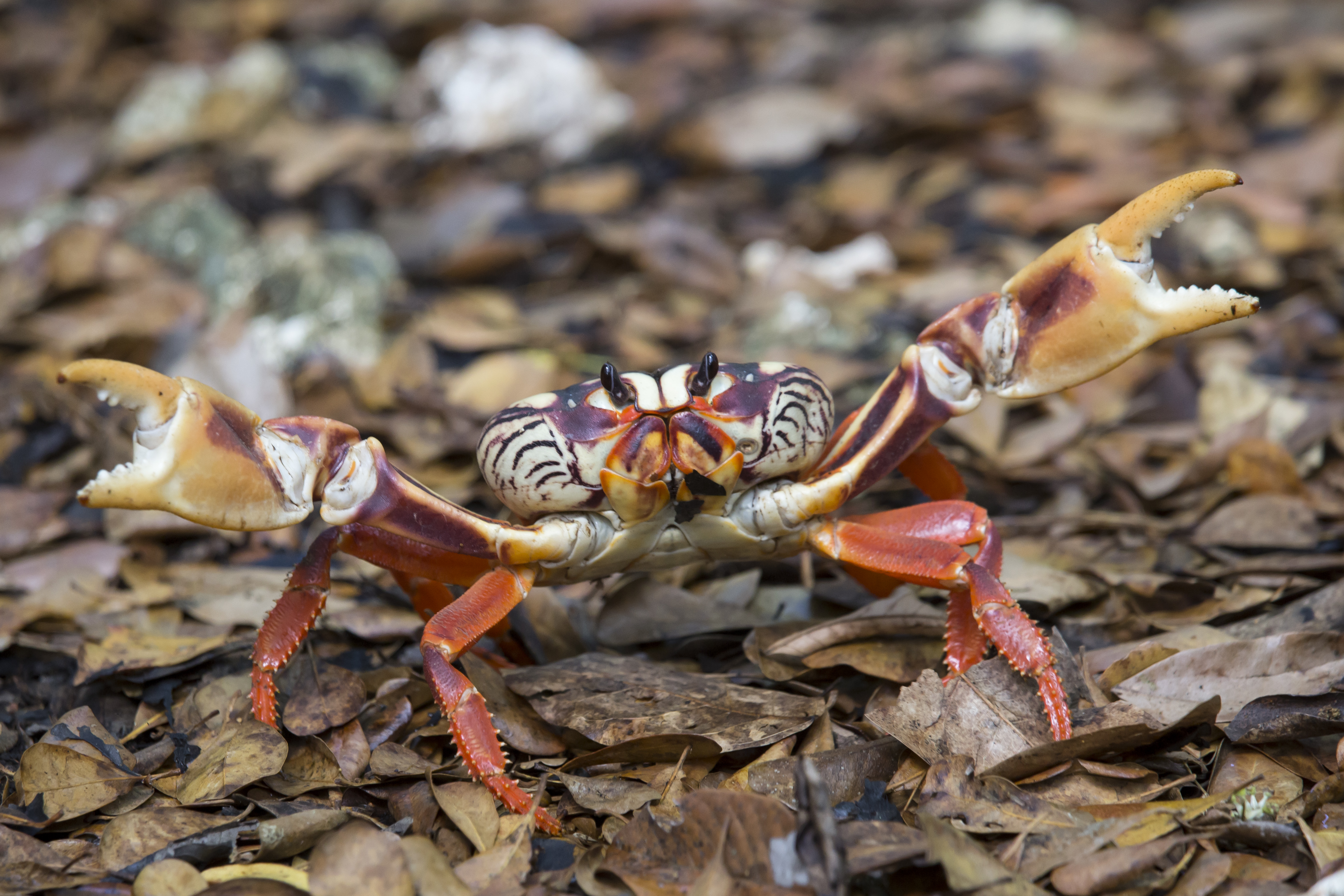

Scientific classification
- Kingdom: Animalia
- Phylum: Arthropoda
- Class: Malacostraca
- Order: Decapoda
- Suborder: Pleocyemata
- Infraorder: Brachyura
- Family: Gecarcinidae
- Genus: Gecarcinus
- Species: G. ruricola

Binomial name
- Gecarcinus ruricola (Linnaeus, 1758)

Synonyms
- Cancer ruricolus Linnaeus, 1758; Ocypode tourlourou Latreille, 1803; Gecarcinus agricola Reichenbach, 1828; Ocypode rubra Fréminville, 1835

= Gecarcinus ruricola =

Species of crustacean

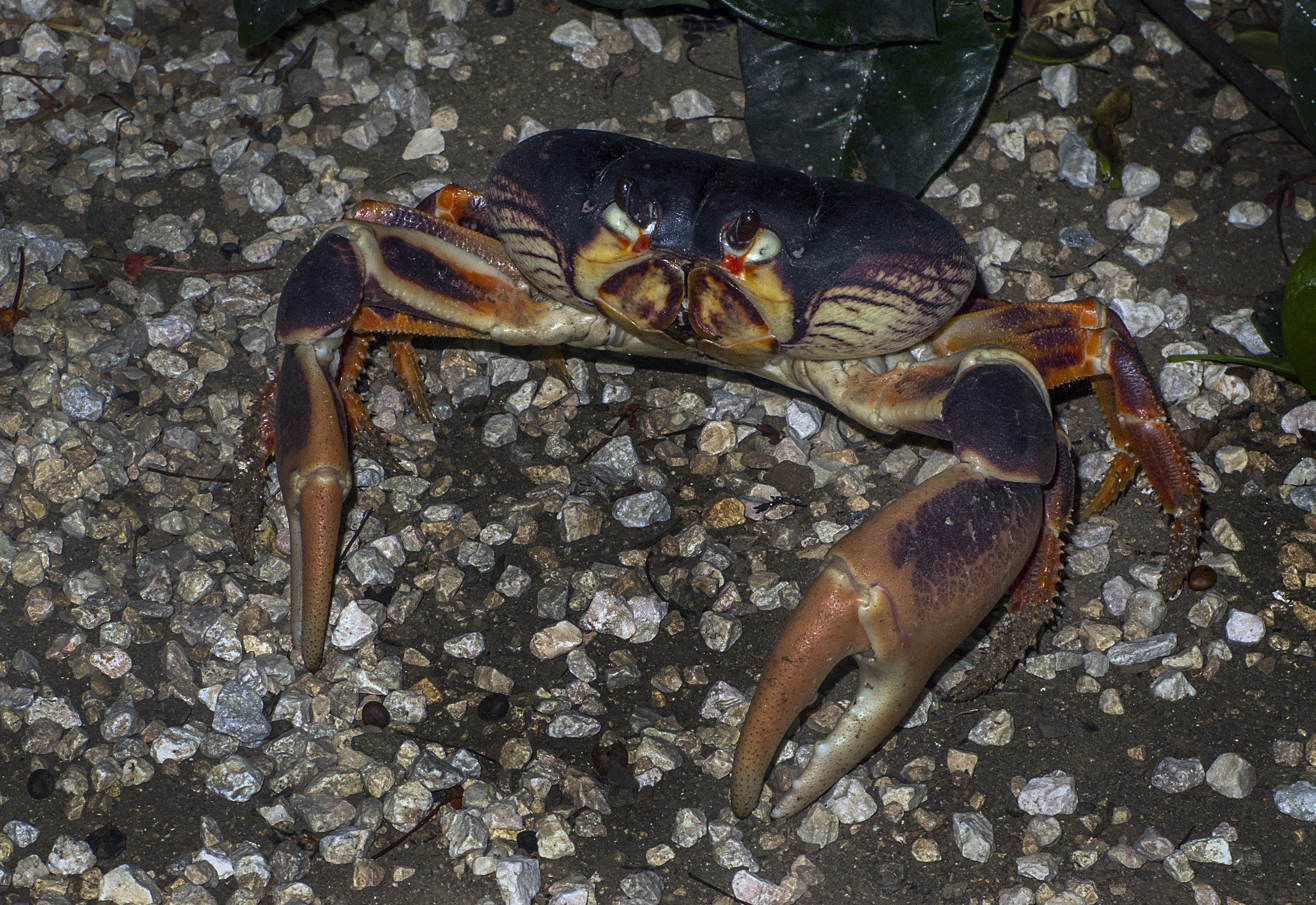
Zombie Crab (Gecarcinus ruricola) Westpunt, Curacao. March 2019

Gecarcinus ruricola is a species of terrestrial crab. It is the most terrestrial of the Caribbean land crabs, and is found from western Cuba across the Antilles as far east as Barbados. Common names for G. ruricola include the purple land crab, black land crab, red land crab, and zombie crab.

== Description ==
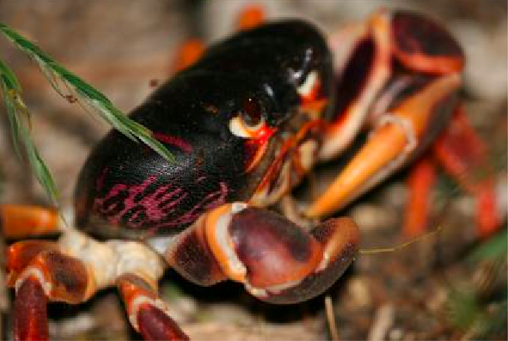
Gecarcinus ruricola

A male G. ruricola

Four colour morphs exist within the species - black, red, yellow, and green. The carapace of G. ruricola grows slowly, with the crabs reaching maturity after 5 years, and living for over 10 years. Their true lifespan is not known. G. ruricola crabs have a number of adaptations to terrestrial life, mostly regarding water conservation. They are nocturnal, to prevent the hot sun from drying them out. They also have a "nephritic pad", onto which urine is released, to be cleaned by microbes before the water is then reabsorbed.

== Distribution ==
G. ruricola is found across much of the Caribbean, from Cuba and the Bahamas in the west through the Antilles to Barbados in the east. It has been reported from Florida and Nicaragua, but few confirmed examples exist from the mainland; Loggerhead Key in the Dry Tortugas marks the northernmost limit of its island distribution, which extends across the Bahamas and Cuba, through the Greater and Lesser Antilles, to Barbados. Outlying populations exist on Curaçao, in the Swan Islands off Honduras, Half Moon Caye of Belize, and the Archipelago of San Andrés, Providencia and Santa Catalina off the Colombian coast.

It can be found at great distances from the sea, and at high altitudes; it has been observed above 300 m (980 ft) on the island of Dominica, and at over 1,000 m (3,300 ft) on Jamaica.

== Life cycle ==
The eggs of G. ruricola hatch in the sea, where the larvae live as plankton. The return of the larvae to land seems to be infrequent, but when they do return, they return as megalopa larvae, in sufficient numbers to turn roads red. They move at speeds of 1–2 m/s (2.2–4.5 mph), or faster if startled. For the next three years, the young crabs live in burrows inhabited by other crabs, and eat food brought back to the burrow by the older crab.

After mating, mass migrations occur, with the females returning to the sea to release their fertilised eggs. A typical female carries around 85,000 eggs.

== Ecology ==
G. ruricola is an omnivorous scavenger, feeding mostly on nitrogen-poor plant matter.

The meat of G. ruricola is rich in protein, and has often been harvested by local people. Other predators may include birds, although information is scarce. When confronted, they rear up and hold their open claws outwards in a defensive posture.

=== Drosophila ===
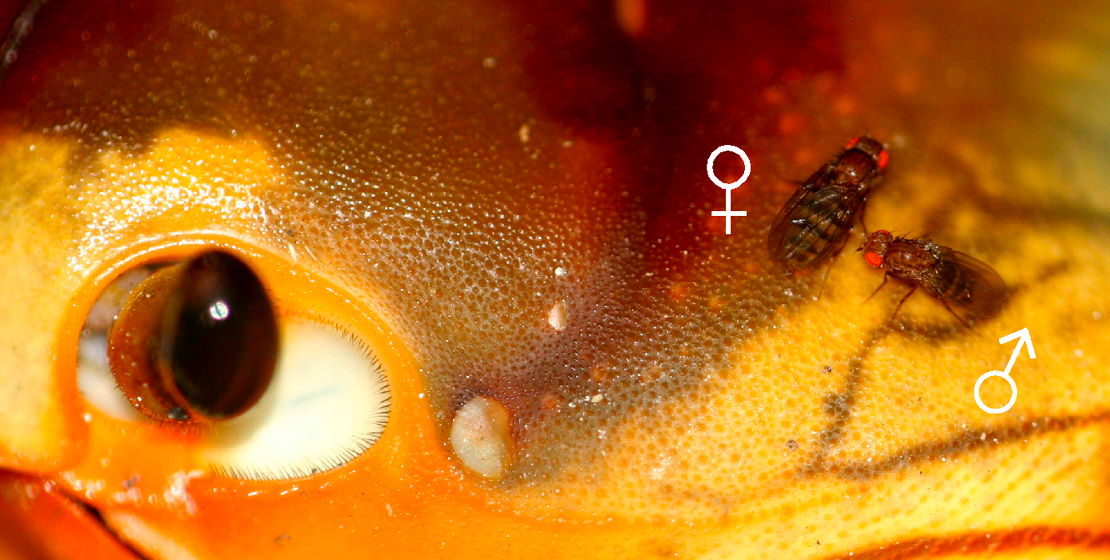
Two Drosophila endobranchiae flies on the carapace of G. ruricola

G. ruricola is the host organism for two species of commensal flies in the genus Drosophila. They were first observed on Montserrat by Henry Guernsey Hubbard in 1894, and presented at a scientific meeting later that year (where the crab was misidentified as Cardisoma guanhumi), but no further research was conducted until 1955, when specimens were again collected, this time from Mona Island, and named as Drosophila carcinophila by M. R. Wheeler.

In 1967, a second species of fly, Drosophila endobranchia, was discovered on G. ruricola, although it also inhabits the closely related species G. lateralis. D. endrobranchia is not closely related to D. carcinophila, and this trait appears to have evolved convergently. (A third species of fly, Lissocephala powelli, has evolved a similar habit on Christmas Island, where it lives on the land crabs Gecarcoidea lalandii, Geograpsus crinipes, and Cardisoma carnifex, and the terrestrial hermit crab Birgus latro.) D. endobranchia evolved from a group of species that breeds on fungi or bark, while D. carcinophila evolved from a group that breeds on cacti.

The flies spend most of their lives on the crab, and are reluctant to leave. They do not need to flee predators, because the crabs they inhabit are fast animals and will flee:

The flies … hardly move at all, are extremely reluctant in leaving their host crabs and are hard pushed to take flight. Although the flies are sluggish, the crabs on which they reside are anything but. Chasing after crabs through a pitch-black jungle (growing on a razor-sharp labyrinthine limestone ground), while trying to aspirate flies from their carapaces is not trivial. Obtaining large amounts of flies in this way is simply a nightmare.

The eggs are laid around the crab's compound eyes; the first-instar larvae migrate to the crab's nephritic pad, and live there, feeding on the microbes that cleanse the crab's urine. The second instar is spent in the crab's gill chamber. The third instar has the larvae return to the mouthparts before falling to the ground to pupate.

== Linnaeus ==
Carl Linnaeus described the species in 1758 (the starting point for zoological nomenclature), noting the species' annual migrations from the forests to the coast (Habitat in America, sylvas vastissimis agminibus quotannis deserens littora maris petiturus: "lives in America; every year, an army marches out of the forests towards the seashore").

== Philately ==
G. ruricola appeared on two African postage stamps for the International Year of the Ocean in 1998, under the name "mountain crab". These were a Tanzanian stamp worth TSh 500/= and a Ugandan stamp worth USh 250/=.
