= Johngarthia weileri =

Scientific classification
- Kingdom: Animalia
- Phylum: Arthropoda
- Clade: Pancrustacea
- Class: Malacostraca
- Order: Decapoda
- Suborder: Pleocyemata
- Infraorder: Brachyura
- Family: Gecarcinidae
- Genus: Johngarthia
- Species: J. weileri

Binomial name
- Johngarthia weileri (Sendler, 1912)

Synonyms
- Gecarcinus weileri Sendler, 1912; Pelocarcinus weileri Sendler, 1912

Species of crab

Johngarthia weileri is a species of land crab in the genus Johngarthia from the eastern Atlantic Ocean.

== Distribution ==
Johngarthia weileri is found on the coast of Cameroon and on the islands in the Gulf of Guinea.

== Taxonomy ==
Gecarcinus weileri was described by Alexander Sendler in 1912, but was treated for a long time as a synonym of G. lagostoma. The two were separated by Michael Türkay in 1973, and placed in the subgenus Johngarthia, which was raised to the rank of genus in 1987 by the same author.
