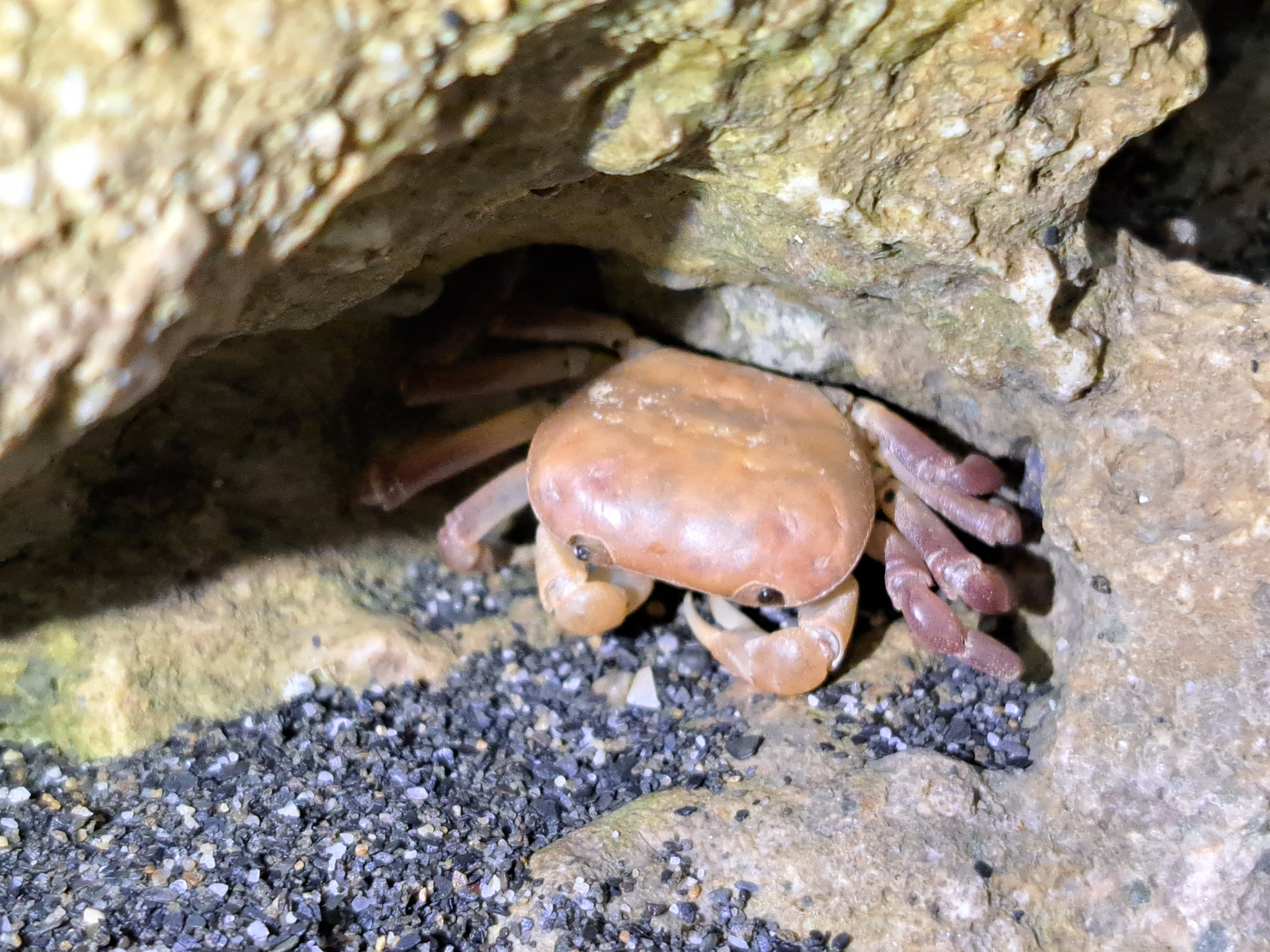
- Epigrapsus politus

Scientific classification
- Kingdom: Animalia
- Phylum: Arthropoda
- Class: Malacostraca
- Order: Decapoda
- Suborder: Pleocyemata
- Infraorder: Brachyura
- Family: Gecarcinidae
- Genus: Epigrapsus; Heller, 1862

Type species
- Epigrapsus politus Heller, 1862

= Epigrapsus =

Genus of crabs

Epigrapsus is genus of terrestrial crabs. The two species are omnivores.

- Epigrapsus notatus (Heller, 1865)
- Epigrapsus politus Heller, 1862
