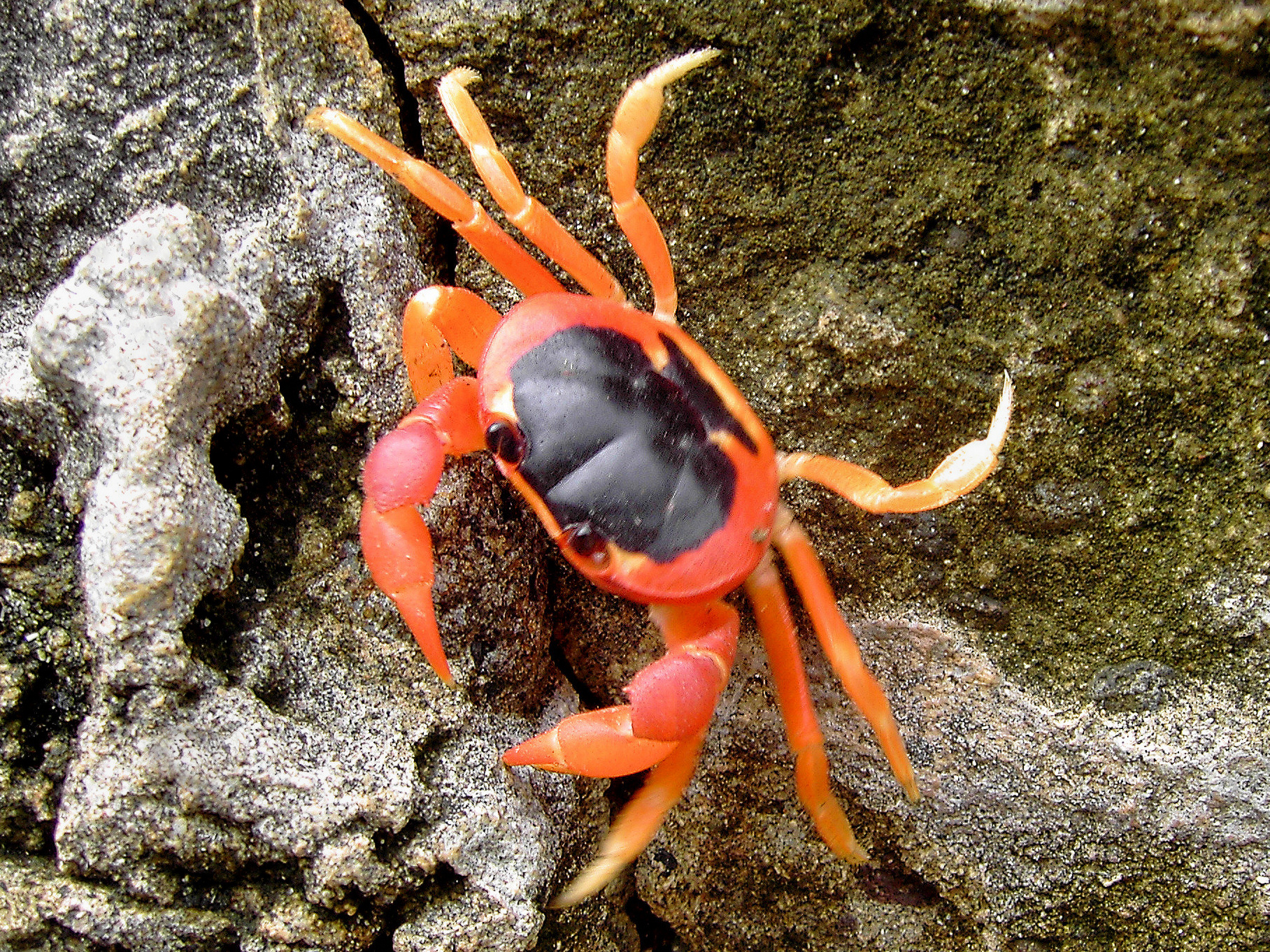
- G. lateralis on Dominica.

Scientific classification
- Kingdom: Animalia
- Phylum: Arthropoda
- Clade: Pancrustacea
- Class: Malacostraca
- Order: Decapoda
- Suborder: Pleocyemata
- Infraorder: Brachyura
- Family: Gecarcinidae
- Genus: Gecarcinus
- Species: G. lateralis

Binomial name
- Gecarcinus lateralis (Freminville, 1835)

= Gecarcinus lateralis =

Species of crustacean

Gecarcinus lateralis, also known by the common names blackback land crab, Bermuda land crab, red land crab (leading to easy confusion with Gecarcoidea natalis) and moon crab (leading to easy confusion with G. quadratus and Cardisoma spp.), is a colourful crab from the family Gecarcinidae.

== Distribution ==
This species is found along the Atlantic coast from South Padre Island, Texas south to Macuto, Venezuela. It also inhabits the Florida Keys and the islands of the Caribbean.

== Relatives ==
The taxonomy in relations to the Pacific Gecarcinus quadratus is disputed, with many considering it and G. lateralis to be conspecific. Another closely related species, Gecarcinus ruricola, occurs together with G. lateralis in the tropical western Atlantic, but its carapace is typically almost entirely blackish, dark maroon, purplish or yellowish.

== Description ==
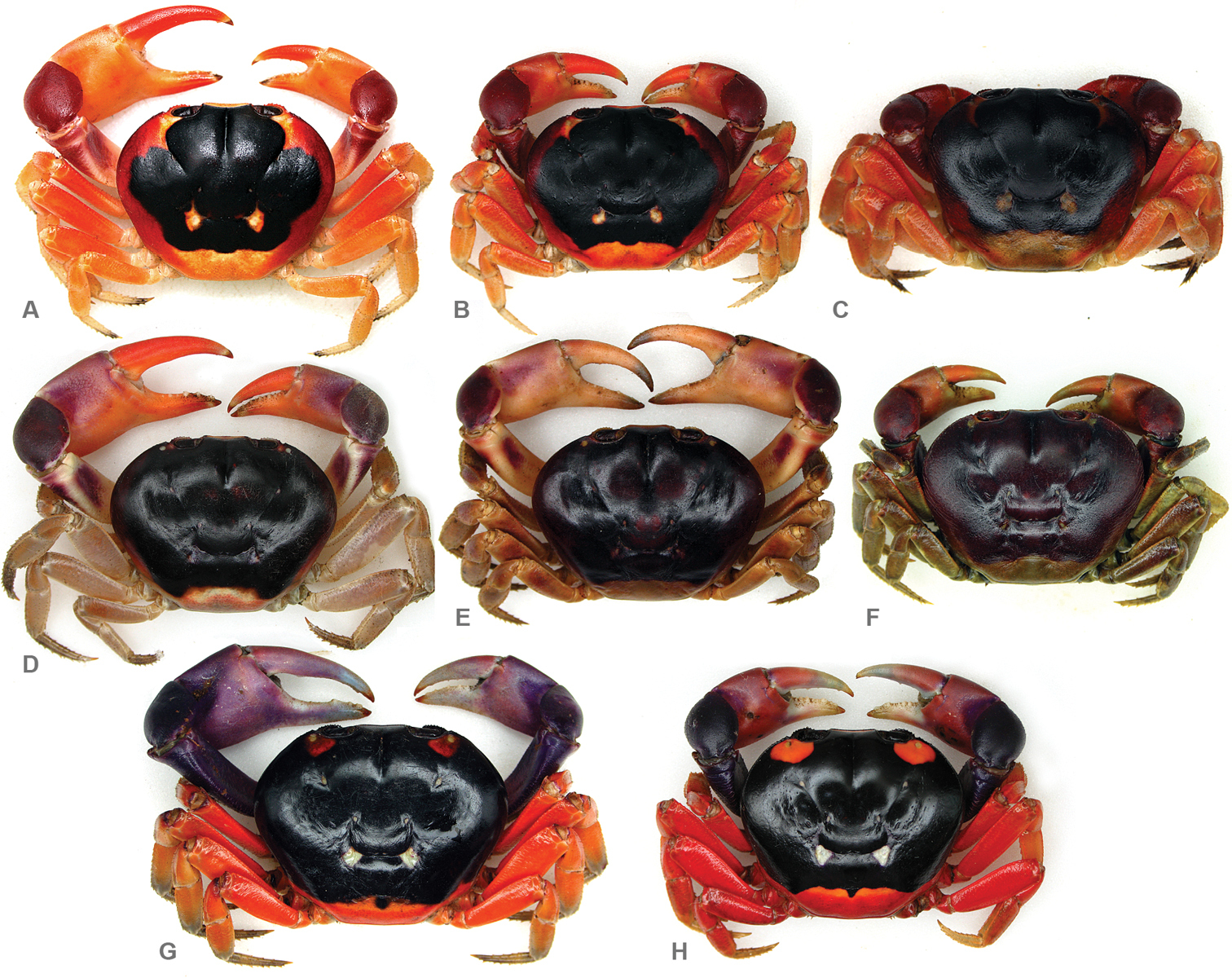
Color variation in G. lateralis from Costa Rica. The lowermost two are from the Pacific population often regarded as a separate species, G. quadratus

As suggested by the name blackback land crab, it has a large blackish spot, which, although the exact shape is variable, covers a large part of the central carapace ("back"). The legs, claws and outer sections of the carapace are reddish, orange or whitish. The carapace may reach a width of up to 11 centimetres (4.3 in).

== Ecology ==
G. lateralis occurs along the dry zone of sandy beaches and nearby hills, around 6–9 metres (20–30 ft) above the highest high tide mark, where there is no standing water, but significant interstitial moisture. They need to return to the ocean to breed (the larvae are released into the sea). Furthermore, its gills need to be moist all the time, or it will die. Compared to most other crustaceans, its blood also has a higher oxygen carrying capacity. It is largely herbivorous, but will take animal matter if available.
