= John Garth =

John Garth may refer to:

- John Garth (author), English journalist and Tolkien scholar
- John Garth (composer) (1721–1810), English composer
- John Garth (politician) (c. 1701–1764), British lawyer and politician
- John S. Garth (1909–1993), American naturalist
