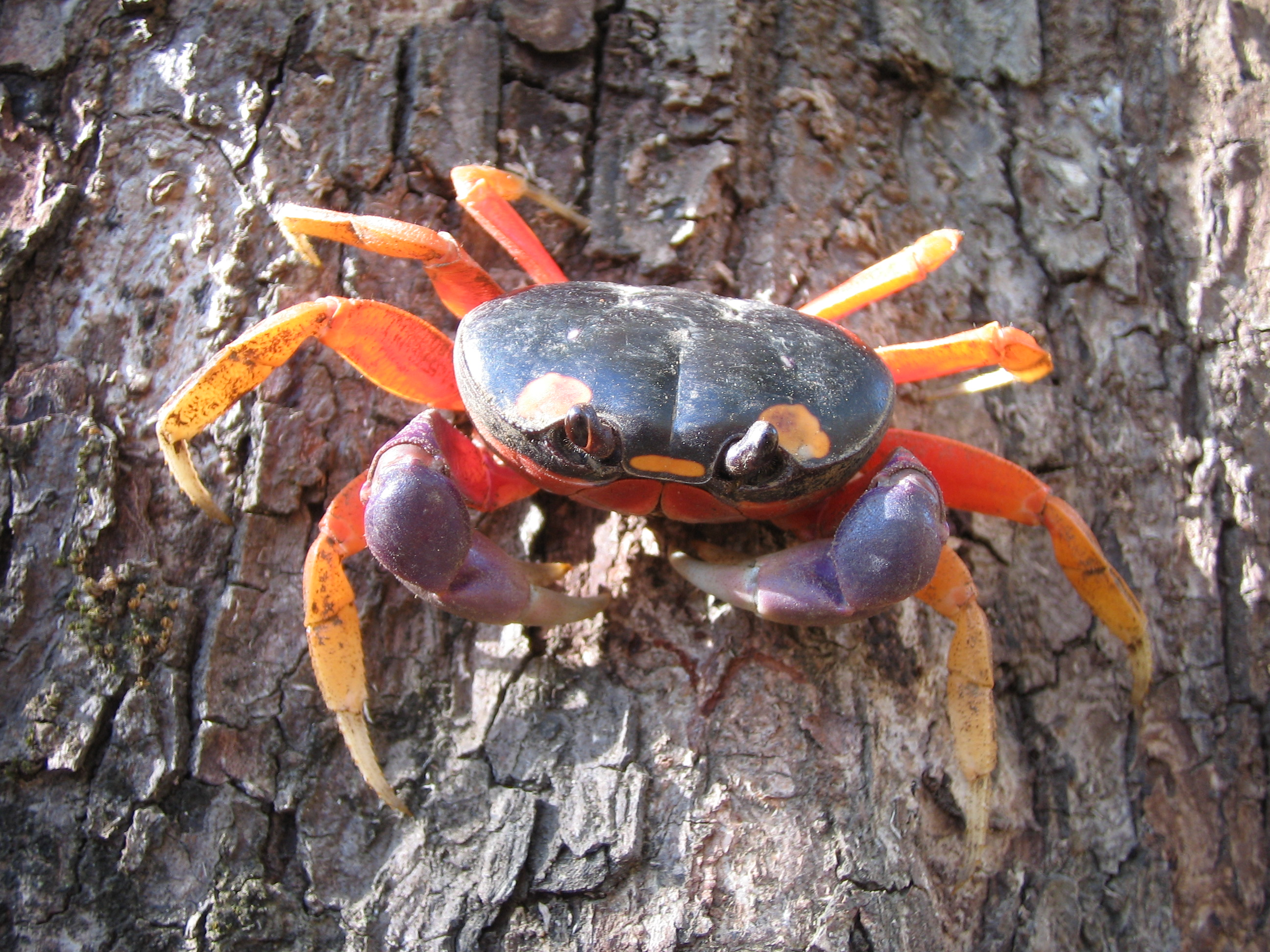
- Gecarcinus quadratus

Scientific classification
- Kingdom: Animalia
- Phylum: Arthropoda
- Class: Malacostraca
- Order: Decapoda
- Suborder: Pleocyemata
- Infraorder: Brachyura
- Family: Gecarcinidae
- Genus: Gecarcinus; Leach, 1814

Type species
- Cancer ruricola Linnaeus, 1758

= Gecarcinus =

Genus of crabs

Gecarcinus is the type genus of the land crab family Gecarcinidae. They are found in warmer coastal regions of the Americas, including islands in the Caribbean. Four species from oceanic islands were formerly included in Gecarcinus as the subgenus Johngarthia, but are now treated as a separate genus, Johngarthia. While all members of this genus are largely terrestrial, they have to return to the ocean to breed (the larvae are released into the sea). They are often colourful, with reddish, orange, purple, yellowish, whitish, or blackish being the dominating hues. This has resulted in some species, notably G. quadratus and G. lateralis, gaining a level of popularity in the pet trade.

== Species ==
Image	Name	Common name	Distribution
	Gecarcinus lateralis (Fréminville, 1835)	black back land crab, Bermuda land crab, red land crab	South Padre Island, Texas, south to Macuto, Venezuela
	Gecarcinus quadratus (Saussure, 1853)	red land crab, whitespot crab, halloween crab, moon crab, halloween moon crab, mouthless crab or harlequin land crab	Pacific coast from Mexico south to Panama
	Gecarcinus ruricola (Linnaeus, 1758)	purple land crab, black land crab, red land crab, and zombie crab	Cuba and the Bahamas in the west through the Antilles to Barbados in the east
	Gecarcinus nobilii (Perger & Wall, 2014)	red land crab, ghostly moon crab, colombian land crab	Pacific coast from Colombia to Peru
