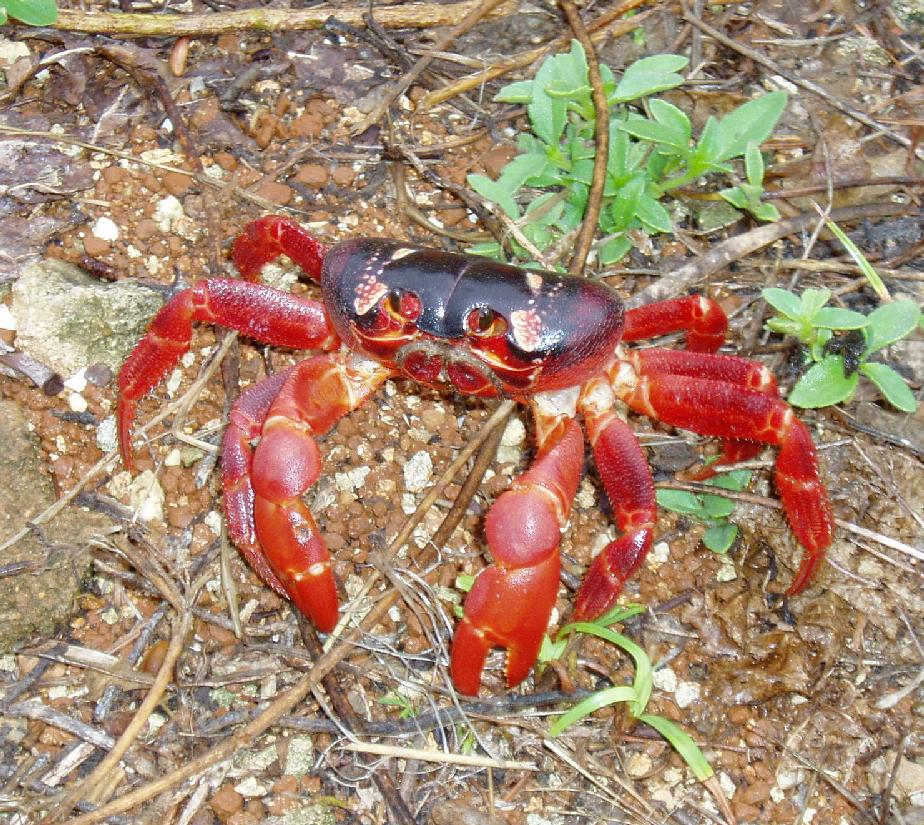
- Christmas Island red crab

Scientific classification
- Kingdom: Animalia
- Phylum: Arthropoda
- Class: Malacostraca
- Order: Decapoda
- Suborder: Pleocyemata
- Infraorder: Brachyura
- Family: Gecarcinidae
- Genus: Gecarcoidea; H. Milne-Edwards, 1837

Synonyms
- Pelocarcinus H. Milne-Edwards, 1853; Hylaeocarcinus Wood-Mason, 1873; Limnocarcinus De Man, 1879

= Gecarcoidea =

Genus of terrestrial crabs

Gecarcoidea is a genus of terrestrial crabs within the family Gecarcinidae.

The following species within the genus Gecarcoidea are recognised:

Image	Name	Common name	Distribution
	Gecarcoidea humei (Wood-Mason, 1874)		the eastern Indian Ocean, including Christmas Island
	Gecarcoidea lalandii H. Milne-Edwards, 1837	Andaman Islands purple crab	the Indo-Pacific from the Andaman Islands and eastwards
	Gecarcoidea natalis Pocock, 1889)	Christmas Island red crab	Christmas Island and Cocos (Keeling) Islands

== History ==
When Michael Türkay revised the Gecarcinidae family in 1974, the G. humei species was originally classified as a junior synonym of the G. lalandii species. However, due to differences in physical characteristics and distribution, G. humei became recognised as an independent species to G. lalandii in 2017.
