= Clipperton =

Clipperton may refer to:

- Clipperton Island, an island in the eastern Pacific Ocean off the coast of Central America
- Clipperton crab, Johngarthia planata, a species of land crab found on Clipperton Island
- Clipperton fracture zone, a geological submarine fracture zone of the Pacific Ocean
- John Clipperton (1676–1722), English buccaneer, namesake of Clipperton Island
