= Terrestrial species =

Terrestrial species may refer to:

- Terrestrial animal
- Terrestrial crab
- Terrestrial mollusc
- Terrestrial plant
