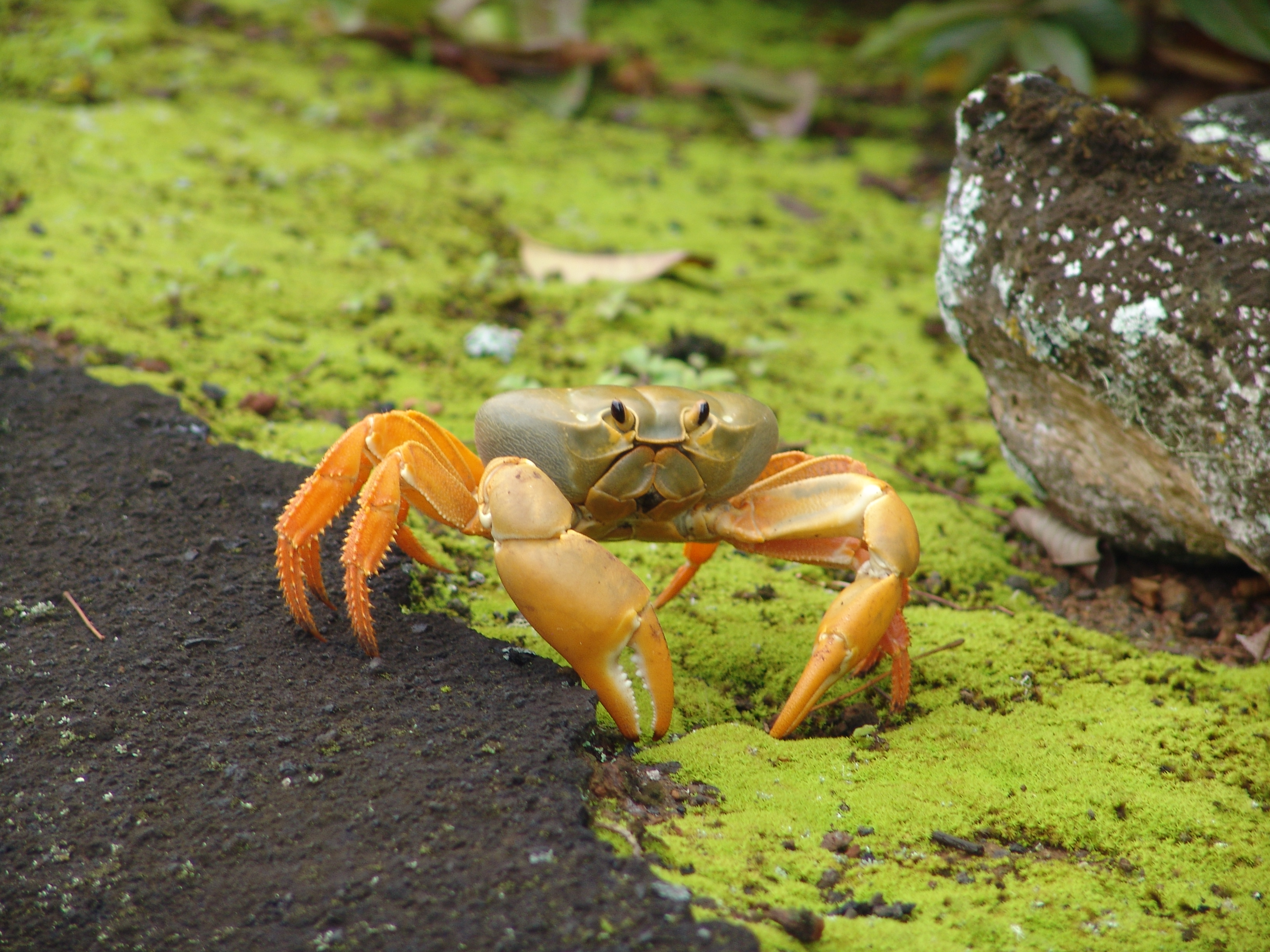
- Johngarthia lagostoma

Scientific classification
- Kingdom: Animalia
- Phylum: Arthropoda
- Class: Malacostraca
- Order: Decapoda
- Suborder: Pleocyemata
- Infraorder: Brachyura
- Family: Gecarcinidae
- Genus: Johngarthia; Türkay, 1970

Type species
- Gecarcinus planatus Stimpson, 1860

= Johngarthia =

Genus of crabs

Johngarthia is a genus of crabs in the land crab family Gecarcinidae, formerly included in the genus Gecarcinus, and containing six species. (Note: Nomenclature follows Ng et al. (2008). Distributions are from Bouchard & Poupin (2009).) The genus bears the name of John S. Garth, a 20th century naturalist who specialized in crabs and other arthropods.

Image	Name	Distribution
	Johngarthia cocoensis Perger, Vargas & Wall, 2011	Eastern Pacific Ocean: Cocos Island off Costa Rica
	Johngarthia lagostoma (H. Milne-Edwards, 1837)	Southern Atlantic Ocean: Ascension Island, Ilha Trindade, Fernando de Noronha, and Atol das Rocas
	Johngarthia malpilensis (Faxon, 1893)	Eastern Pacific Ocean: Malpelo Island
	Johngarthia oceanica Perger, 2019 (Clipperton crab)	Eastern Pacific Ocean: Clipperton Island, Socorro Island (Revillagigedo Islands)
	Johngarthia planata (Stimpson, 1860)	Eastern Pacific Ocean: Gulf of California, Costa Rica (Colorada, Cano and Nairita Islands), Colombia (Gorgona Island), and continental mainland beaches of Mexico (Oaxaca, Guerrero, Colima, Nayarit, Jalisco and Sinaloa)
	Johngarthia weileri (Sendler, 1912)	Eastern Atlantic Ocean: coast of Cameroon and islands of the Gulf of Guinea
