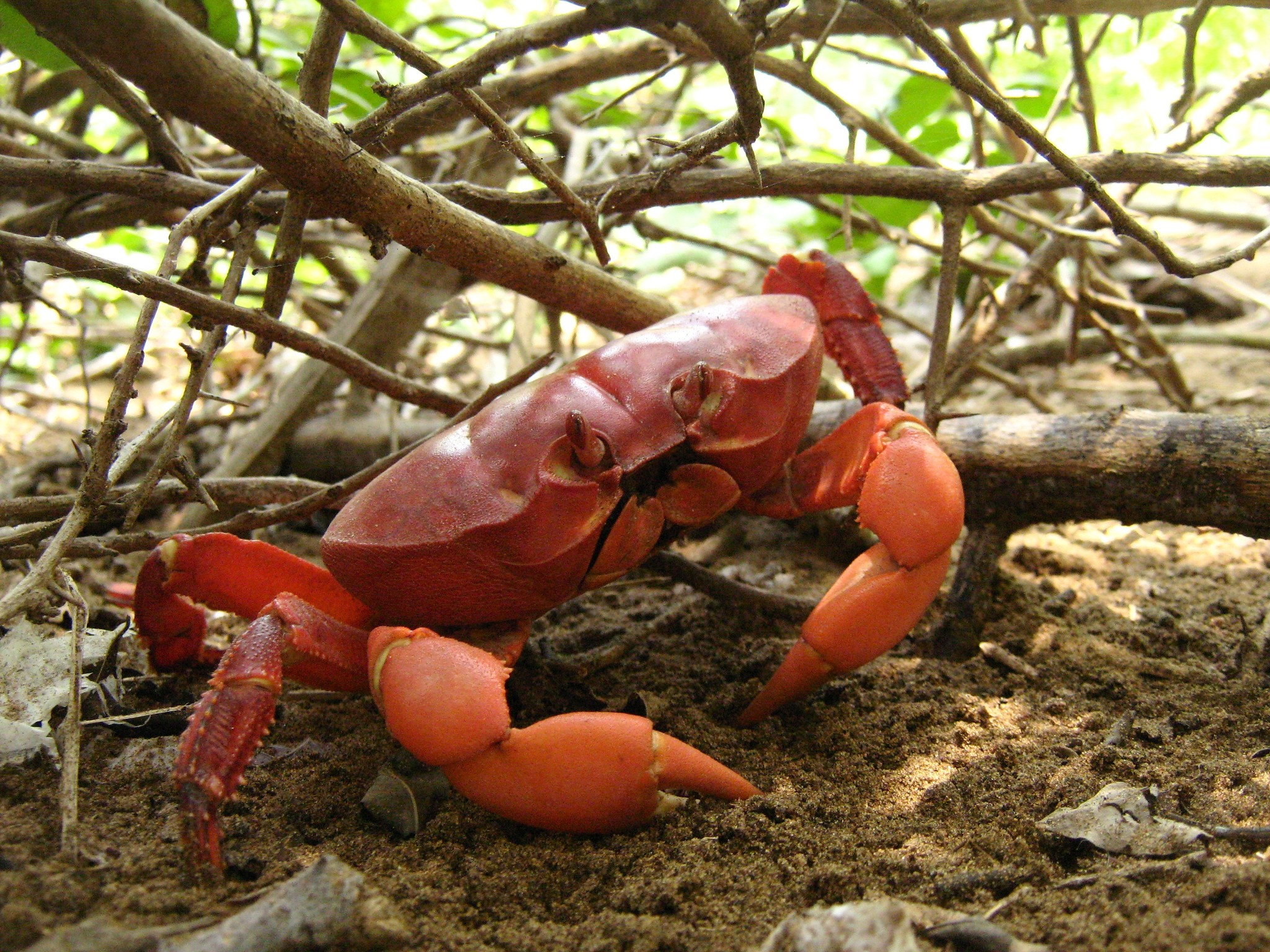
- Pictured in Jalisco, Mexico

Scientific classification
- Kingdom: Animalia
- Phylum: Arthropoda
- Class: Malacostraca
- Order: Decapoda
- Suborder: Pleocyemata
- Infraorder: Brachyura
- Family: Gecarcinidae
- Genus: Johngarthia
- Species: J. planata

Binomial name
- Johngarthia planata (Stimpson, 1860)

Synonyms
- Gecarcinus planatus Stimpson, 1860

= Johngarthia planata =

Species of crab

Johngarthia planata is a bright orange species of land crab that lives on inshore islands and the continental mainland coast of the tropical and subtropical Pacific coast of the Americas, including the Gulf of California, Costa Rica (Colorada, Cano and Nairita Islands), Colombia (Gorgona Island), and continental mainland beaches of Mexico (Oaxaca, Guerrero, Colima, Nayarit, Jalisco and Sinaloa). The crabs are omnivorous and feed on seaweed (algae), vegetation and sometimes carrion.

Prior to 2019, Clipperton crabs, the land crabs on Clipperton Island in the eastern Pacific and on Socorro Island in the Revillagigedo Islands off Mexico, were grouped with J. palanata; however, revaluation determined them to belong to a separate species, J. oceanica (Perger, 2019). J. oceanica differs from J. planata in the shape of the mesial lobe of the infraorbital margin and the color of its carapace.
