= John S. Garth =

American scientist (1909–1993)

- Born: October 3, 1909; Los Angeles, California
- Died: October 18, 1993 (aged 84); Long Beach, California, U.S.A.
- Citizenship: United States
- Spouse: Isla Detter
- Scientific career
- Fields: Biology, carcinology

John Shrader Garth (1909–1993) was a 20th-century American naturalist and professor who specialized in marine crustaceans and butterflies. The crab genus Johngarthia is named for him.

== Marriage, family, and later life ==
Garth married Isla Lora Detter in 1940. They had one child, daughter Linda Jean, born January 16, 1945. Linda Jean died suddenly on October 20, 1967. She was not married and had no children. John Garth died October 18, 1993, at his home in Long Beach. Isla Garth died in 2007.
