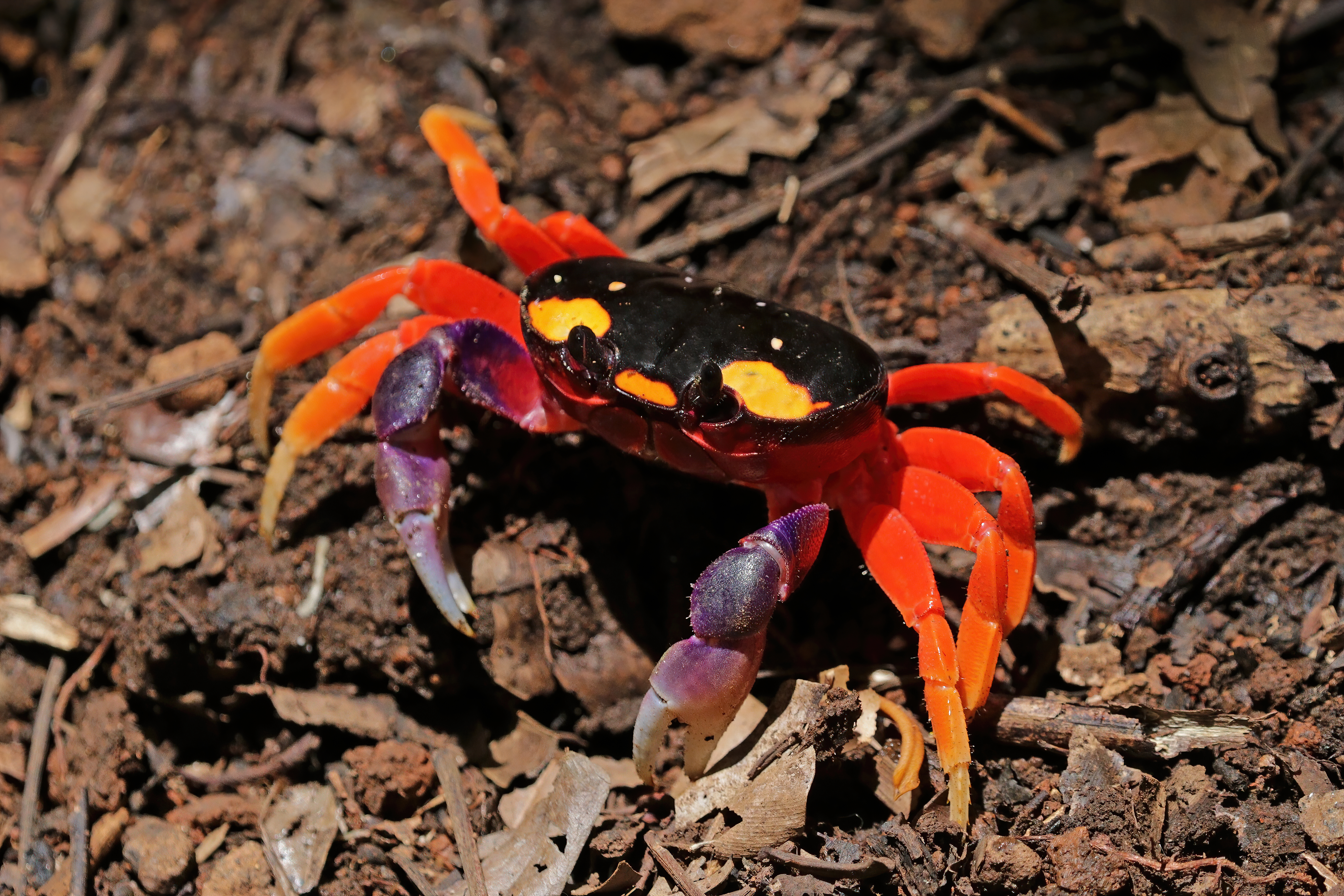
- On Parida Island, Panama

Scientific classification
- Kingdom: Animalia
- Phylum: Arthropoda
- Clade: Pancrustacea
- Class: Malacostraca
- Order: Decapoda
- Suborder: Pleocyemata
- Infraorder: Brachyura
- Family: Gecarcinidae
- Genus: Gecarcinus
- Species: G. quadratus

Binomial name
- Gecarcinus quadratus De Saussure, 1853

= Gecarcinus quadratus =

Species of crab

Gecarcinus quadratus is a semi-terrestrial land crab from the family Gecarcinidae. Originally thought to be a subspecies of Gecarcinus lateralis, they are now recognized as separate species.

They are found in various locations across the Pacific and Atlantic coasts of the Americas.

Their unique colouration of oranges, yellows, purples, and black are one of the most notable features of G. quadratus, as well as the prominent markings along its carapace that help distinguish it from other crabs, specifically Gecarcinus lateralis. Usually ranging in sizes from around 2.7 to 5 cm (1 to 2 inches), females and males have varying carapace lengths and widths, as well as other distinguishable traits.

== Description and morphology ==
Gecarcinus quadratus has distinctive morphological traits that differentiate it from other closely related members of the family Gecarcinidae. The carapace of G. quadratus is typically transversely oval in shape and is primarily dark purple or black, while ranging in size from around 2.7 to 5 cm (1 to 2 inches). Three key identifying characteristics of the shell are the pair of whitish spots located on the central-lower carapace, the pair of defined yellow or orange spots situated behind the orbitals, and the singular orange spot locacted directly between the orbitals. The underside and walking legs of G. quadratus are lighter in shade, usually ranging from light orange to almost red in colour, while the chelipeds can be various shades of purple.

== Distribution ==
Gecarcinus quadratus is distributed along the Pacific coasts of the Americas, from the Gulf of California southward through Mexico and Costa Rica to Peru, and along the western Atlantic coast from Florida and Bermuda through the Antilles and Central America to Guyana.

== Habitat ==
G. quadratus is found in the coastal rainforests of Mexico and Central America, and is common along the coasts of Mexico, Costa Rica, Panama, and Nicaragua. It is always found near water and moist environments, despite its inability to swim. It therefore spends most of its time on land, in said forests and mangroves.

== Behaviour and ecology ==
This nocturnal crab digs burrows—sometimes as long as 1.5 m (4.9 ft). It is largely herbivorous and consumes leaf litter and seedlings.

== Sexual differences ==
Male and female Gecarcinus quadratus show marked sexual dimorphism. The males tend to have larger carapace lengths and widths than females, averaging about 2 to 3 mm (0.08 to 0.12 in) larger for length and 4 to 6 mm (0.16 to 0.24 in) for width. Both males and females have approximately equal cheliped size; the exception is in considerably larger males, where there is a clear size difference in the chelae (cheliped dimorphism). Finally, there are differences in the shapes of the pleon and/or abdomen. The male's pleon is narrow and triangular, while the female's pleon is broad and subcircular and entirely or nearly entirely encompasses the thoracic sterna.
