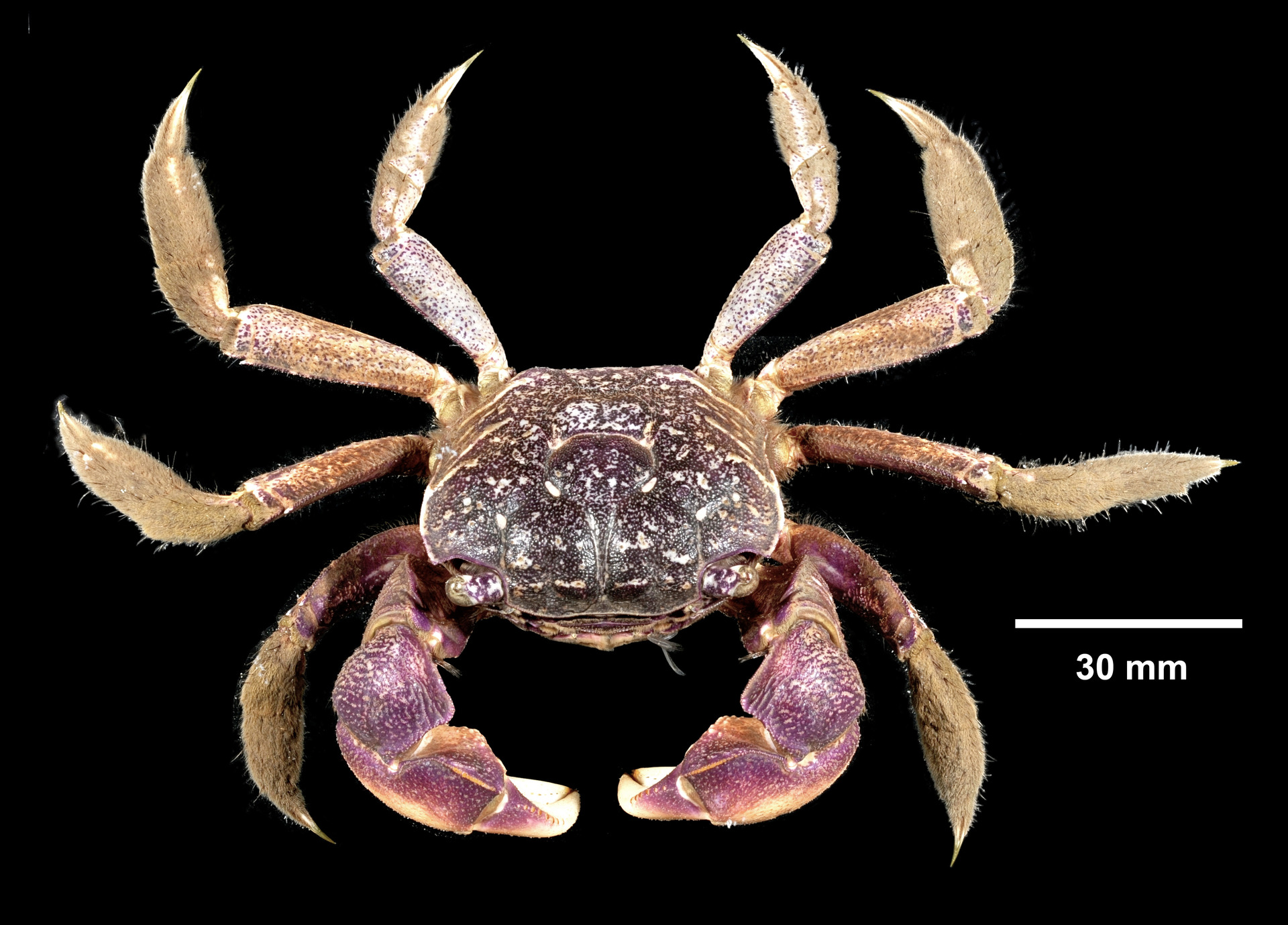
- Purple marsh crab (Sesarma reticulatum)

Scientific classification
- Kingdom: Animalia
- Phylum: Arthropoda
- Class: Malacostraca
- Order: Decapoda
- Suborder: Pleocyemata
- Infraorder: Brachyura
- Section: Eubrachyura

Groups included
- Gecarcinidae; Gecarcinucidae; Sesarma

= Terrestrial crab =

Terrestrial crab Temporal range: Cretaceous–present
- Purple land crab (Gecarcinus ruricola)

Crabs that live primarily on land

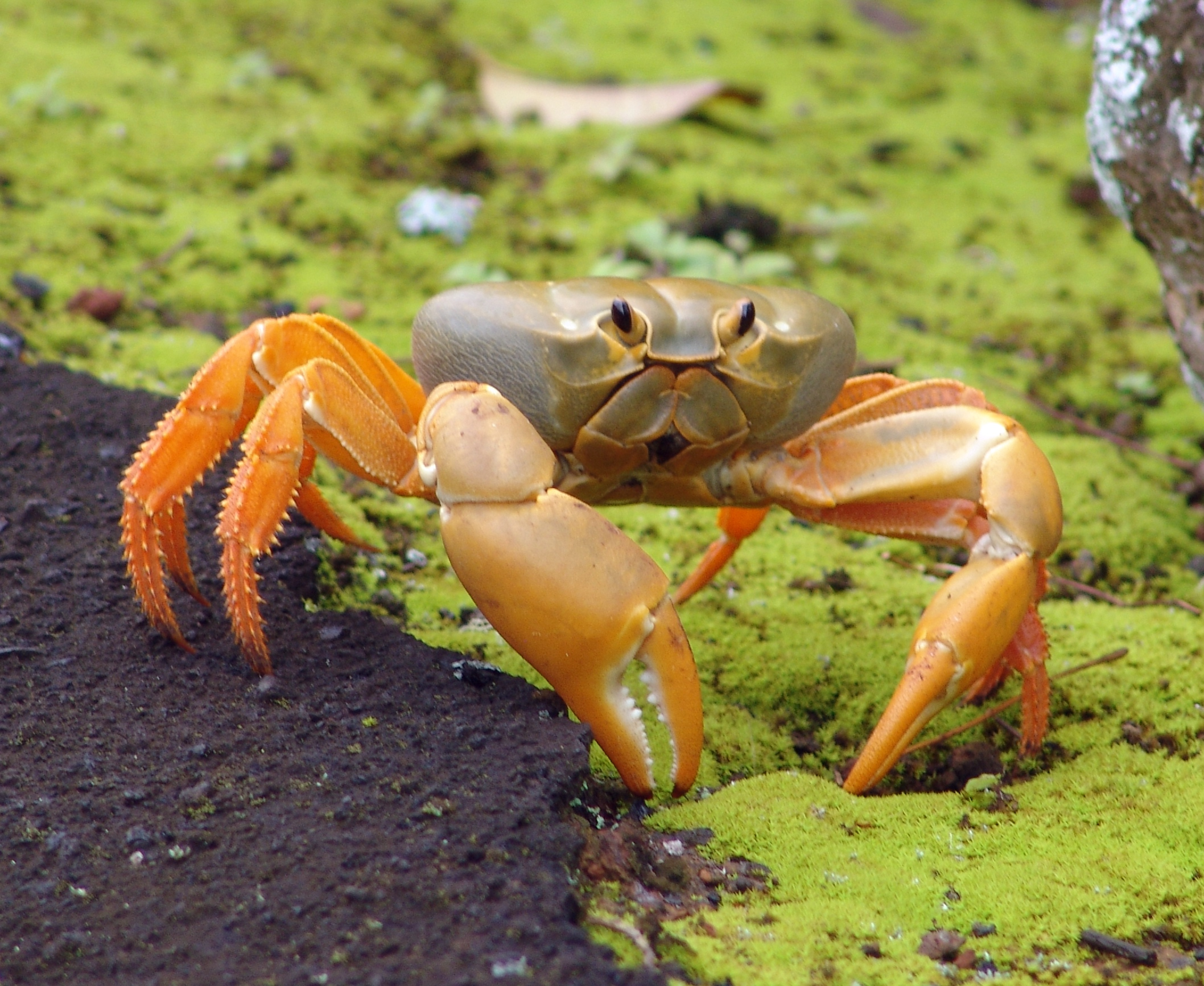
Johngarthia lagostoma (Gecarcinidae), a terrestrial crab found on Ascension Island, where it is the largest native land animal

A number of lineages of crabs have evolved to live predominantly on land. Examples of terrestrial crabs are found in the families Gecarcinidae and Gecarcinucidae, as well as in selected genera from other families, such as Sesarma, although the term "land crab" is often used to mean solely the family Gecarcinidae.

== Terrestriality and migration ==
No clear distinction is made between "terrestrial", "semiterrestrial", and "aquatic" crabs. Rather, a continuum of terrestriality is displayed among the true crabs, although most land-adapted crabs must still return to water to release their eggs. Some species of terrestrial crabs can be found many kilometres from the sea, but have to complete annual migrations to the sea. For example, following the Indian Ocean monsoon, the Christmas Island red crab (Gecarcoidea natalis) migrates en masse, forming a "living carpet" of crabs. The crabs can travel up to 1.46 km (0.91 mi) in a day, and up to 4 km (2.5 mi) in total. Only a few land crabs, including certain Geosesarma species, have direct development (the mother carries the eggs until they have become tiny, fully developed crabs), and these do not need access to water to breed. Many crabs belonging to the family Potamidae, which contains mostly freshwater crabs, have developed a semiterrestrial (for instance the genus Nanhaipotamon) to terrestrial life history, and are sometimes independent of fresh water for reproduction (for instance the genus Tiwaripotamon).

== Ecology ==
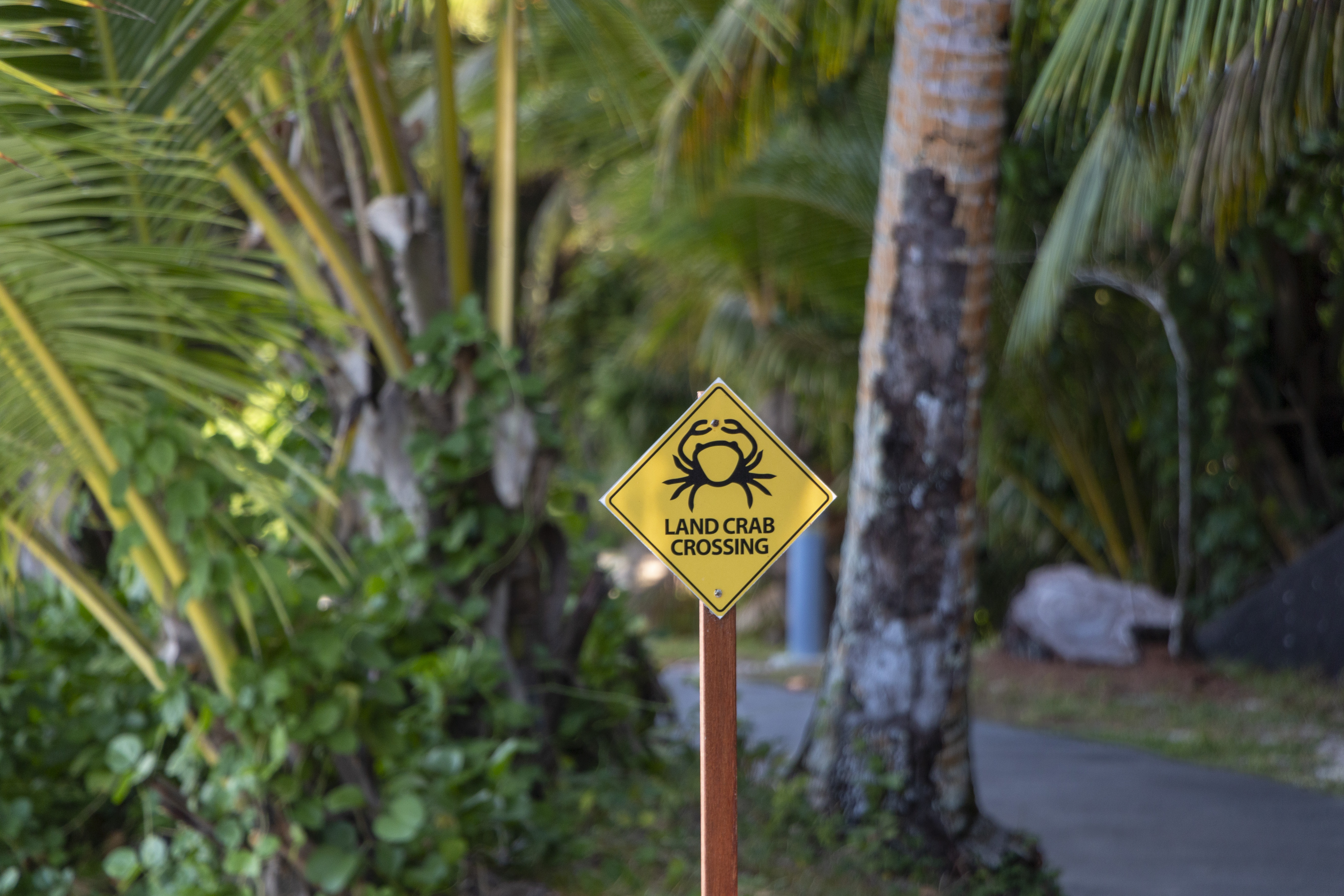
Land crab warning road sign in Seychelles

Terrestrial crabs are often similar to freshwater crabs, since the physiological changes needed for living in fresh water are preadaptations for terrestrial living. On some oceanic islands, terrestrial crabs occupy the top of the energy pyramid.

== See also ==
- Freshwater crab
- Coenobitidae, terrestrial hermit crabs
- Coconut crab (Birgus latro), a terrestrial hermit crab that is the largest terrestrial invertebrate in the world
