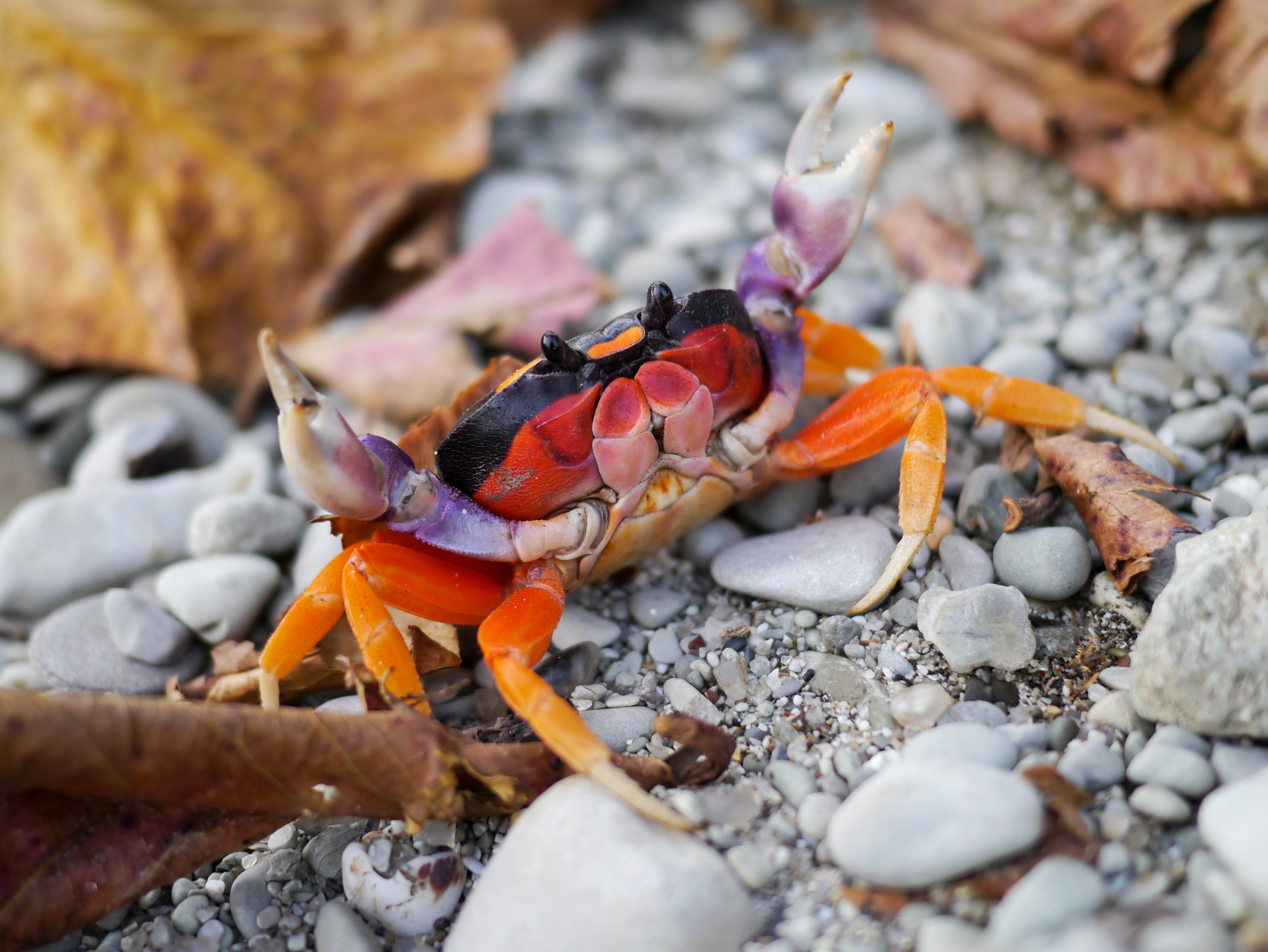
- Gecarcinus quadratus (Halloween crab)

Scientific classification
- Kingdom: Animalia
- Phylum: Arthropoda
- Clade: Pancrustacea
- Class: Malacostraca
- Order: Decapoda
- Suborder: Pleocyemata
- Infraorder: Brachyura
- Superfamily: Grapsoidea
- Family: Gecarcinidae; MacLeay, 1838

= Gecarcinidae =

Family of crabs

Gecarcinidae, or land crabs, are a family of true crabs that are adapted for terrestrial existence. Similar to all other crabs, land crabs possess a series of gills. In addition, the area of the carapace covering the gills is inflated and equipped with extra blood vessels. These organs extract oxygen from the air, analogous to the vertebrate lungs. These are called branchiostegal lungs. Adult land crabs are terrestrial, but visit the sea periodically, where they breed and their larvae develop. Land crabs are tropical omnivores which sometimes cause considerable damage to crops. Most land crabs have one of their claws larger than the other.

The family contains these genera:

- Cardisoma
- Discoplax
- Epigrapsus
- Gecarcinus
- Gecarcoidea
- Johngarthia
- Tuerkayana

Mitochondrial genome sequencing indicates that members of the family (Gecarcoidia natalis and Cardisoma carnifex) are sister to the Sesarmidae.

== See also ==
- Sesarmidae, another family of terrestrial crabs
- Coenobitidae, terrestrial hermit crabs
