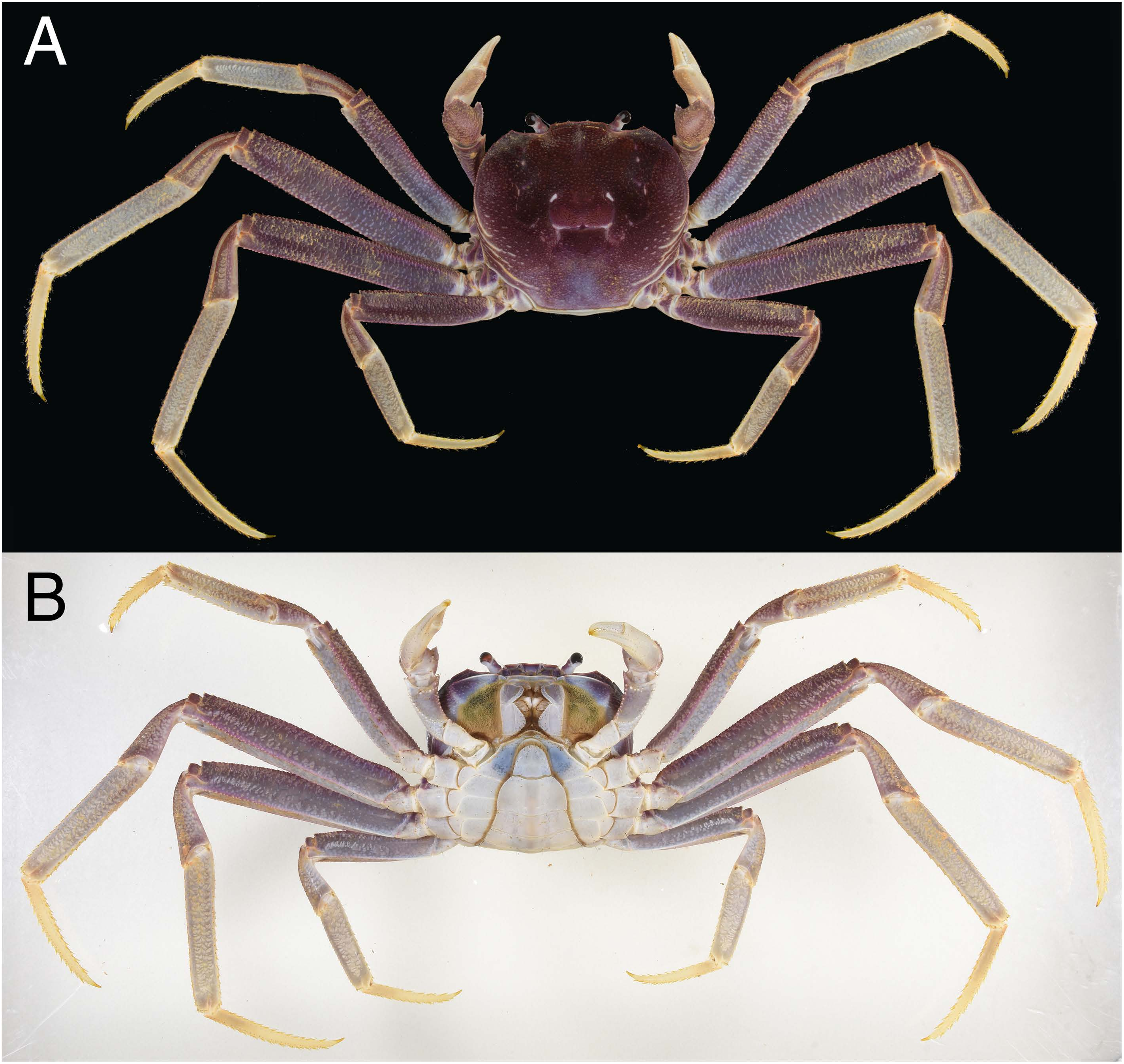
- Upper and lower view of a specimen from Hateruma Island, Japan.

Scientific classification
- Kingdom: Animalia
- Phylum: Arthropoda
- Class: Malacostraca
- Order: Decapoda
- Suborder: Pleocyemata
- Infraorder: Brachyura
- Family: Gecarcinidae
- Genus: Discoplax
- Species: D. gracilipes

Binomial name
- Discoplax gracilipes Ng and Guinot, 2001

= Discoplax gracilipes =

Species of land crab

Discoplax gracilipes is a species of cave-dwelling, terrestrial crab found in the Philippines and far southern Japan. The crabs have extremely long, stalk-like walking legs and are generally coloured purple. They inhabit warm, shallow cave pools which they share with several other crab species, as well as a variety of other animals. The crabs are foragers active both day and night, emerging to search for food and to release eggs into the sea. They were first reported by scientists in Panglao in the Philippines in the late 20th century, but the species was not given a formal scientific description until 2000. In the subsequent decades, the crabs were found on other nearby islands in the Philippines, and in 2023, a single crab was discovered living in a cave on a Japanese island near Taiwan, extending its known range by 1,400 kilometres (870 mi). A member of the family Gecarcinidae, D. gracilipes is believed to be most closely related to D. longipes. The locals in Panglao who catch them call them Alikuai.

== Taxonomy ==
Discoplax gracilipes, first scientifically described in 2001, is classified in the family Gecarcinidae, a group of land-dwelling crabs found around the western Indo-Pacific region. In the late 20th century, a researcher collected from some caves in Bohol small specimens of a Discoplax-genus crab similar to Discoplax longipes. The cave specimens were all either at the juvenile or subadult life-stage and had a smoother texture and proportionally stalkier walking legs than D. longipes. In 1992 these cave specimens were viewed by Peter Kee Lin Ng and Danièle Guinot, who waited until adult specimens of the cave crab were discovered to describe it as a new species. These were uncovered in 2000 by a professor and his students at the University of San Carlos; the next year Ng and Guinot published a description of the cave species in The Raffles Bulletin of Zoology. They named the cave crab D. gracilipes, with the holotype specimen being a male collected by townspeople from a local cave in Panglao in 2000. The holotype was then deposited in the collection of the University of San Carlos. In Panglao they are called Alikuai by locals, who speak the Boholano language.The species' discovery in far southern Japan led to the proposal of a Japanese name for the species, Sūin-oka-gani, derived from sūin, a word for anchihaline tide pools in the local tongue and oka-gani, meaning land crab in Japanese.

=== Phylogenetic studies ===
Species related to D. gracilipes

- - - - T. hirtipes
      - T. rotundum
    - - T. magna
      - T. celeste
  - - Discoplax longipes
    - Discoplax gracilipes

After Ng & Shih, 2014

A 2014 study by Peter Kee Lin Ng and Hsi-Te Shih, also published in The Raffles Bulletin, used Discoplax gracilipes as an outgroup to determine the relationship among Discoplax longipes, Discoplax hirtipes, Discoplax rotunda, and Discoplax magna. Their research showed support for a "long-legged" clade composed of D. gracilipes and D. longipes, with the other four species forming a second clade. Their results came from a genetic analysis which looked at a gene called cytochrome c oxidase subunit I (COI) and, from the mitochondrial genome, 16S rRNA. The "long-legged" species are both adapted for cave-dwelling. The four other species would later be siphoned off into a new genus, Tuerkayana, in a 2018 taxonomic revision.

== Description ==
=== General appearance ===
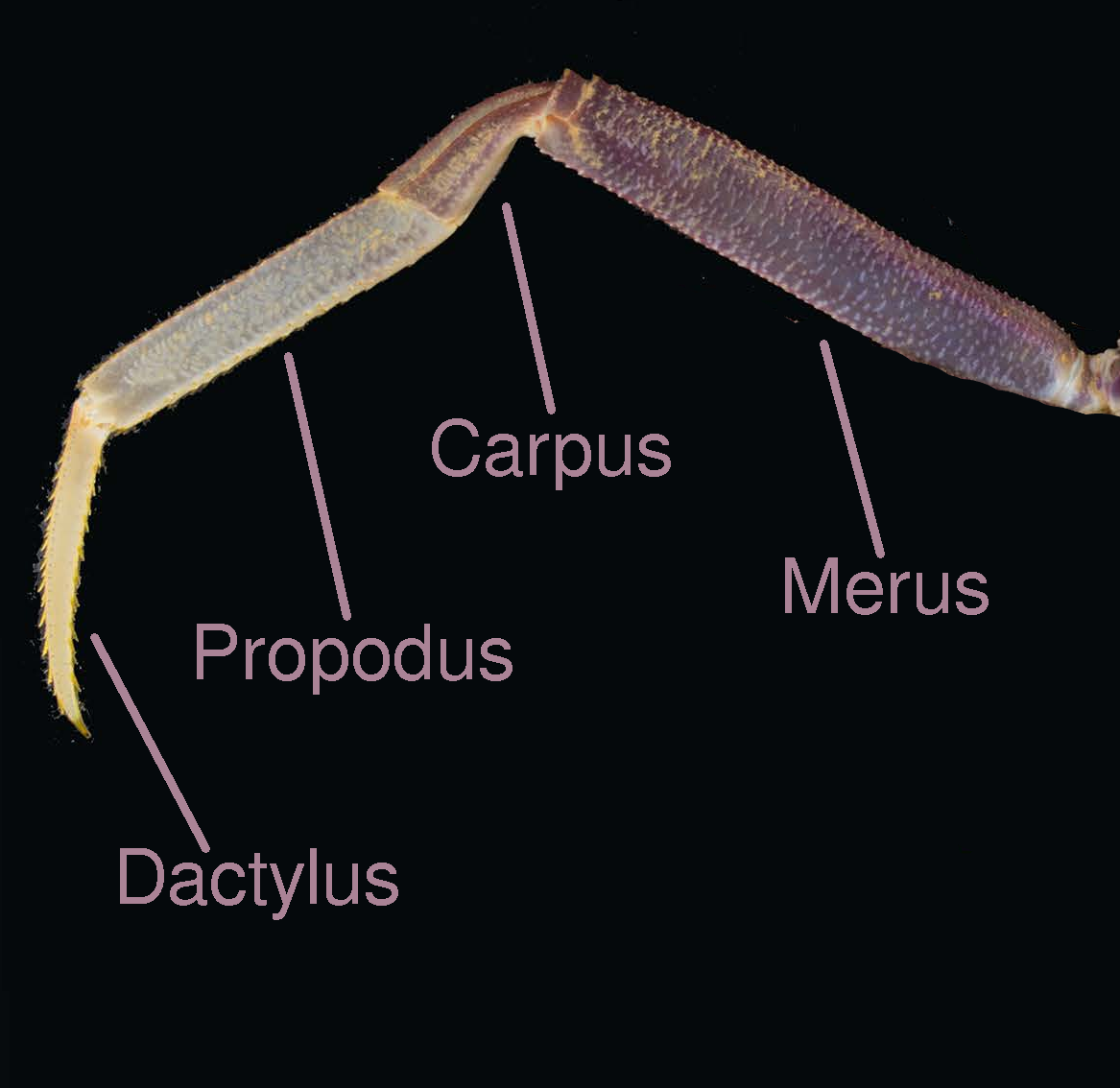
Diagram indicating the segments of a crab walking leg.

Discoplax gracilipes crabs are fairly small, with oval-shaped carapaces usually somewhat wider than they are long.^{:178} In colour they range from greyish lilac to violet, indigo, and deep red,^{:324} with some pale markings on the carapace. Their undersides are generally pale. The male holotype specimen carapace measured 4.6 by 5.3 cm – actually longer than wide.^{:324} Male D. gracilipes crabs have carapace widths ranging from 2.3 to 5.4 cm across; females are slightly more diverse, ranging from 1.7 to 5.5 cm across. On average the carapace width is 115% of the carapace length (CL). The length of the second segment (the merus) of the fourth walking leg (pereiopod) averages 101% of the CL (carapace length) in males and 104% in females, with the highest recorded length in proportion in the CL being 136%, in a female. The other leg segments of the fourth walking leg are shorter, with the fourth segment (the propodus) being the second-longest at on average three quarters the CL.^{:182} The third pair of walking legs is the longest; the last, the shortest; and all are hairless and covered with small bumps. The dimensions of the walking legs vary considerably among mature individuals. Other features do not have significant variation. Compared to Discoplax longipes, D. gracilipes has more variation in pereiopod proportions, and both species have longer-legged juveniles.^{:325}

Discoplax gracilipes have small eyes mounted on short eyestalks, each about 12.5% of the CL. The cornea of the eye is spherical and has a diameter of about 11% of the CL.^{:182} The eyes are well-developed and fill the entire eye socket. The front and rear edges of the carapace are both mildly convex. The chelipeds are slightly bumpy, rough, and unequal in size. There is a deep set of grooves forming an "H" shape in the middle of the carapace towards the back end; the branchial regions – the area around the gills – is rough with grainy particles and the back corner (posterolateral) edges of the carapace have prominent diagonal grooves "of various lengths and strengths". The posterolateral edge itself gently curves outwards, as does the back edge of the carapace. The front corners of the underside of the carapace are densely covered with short, beige hairs.

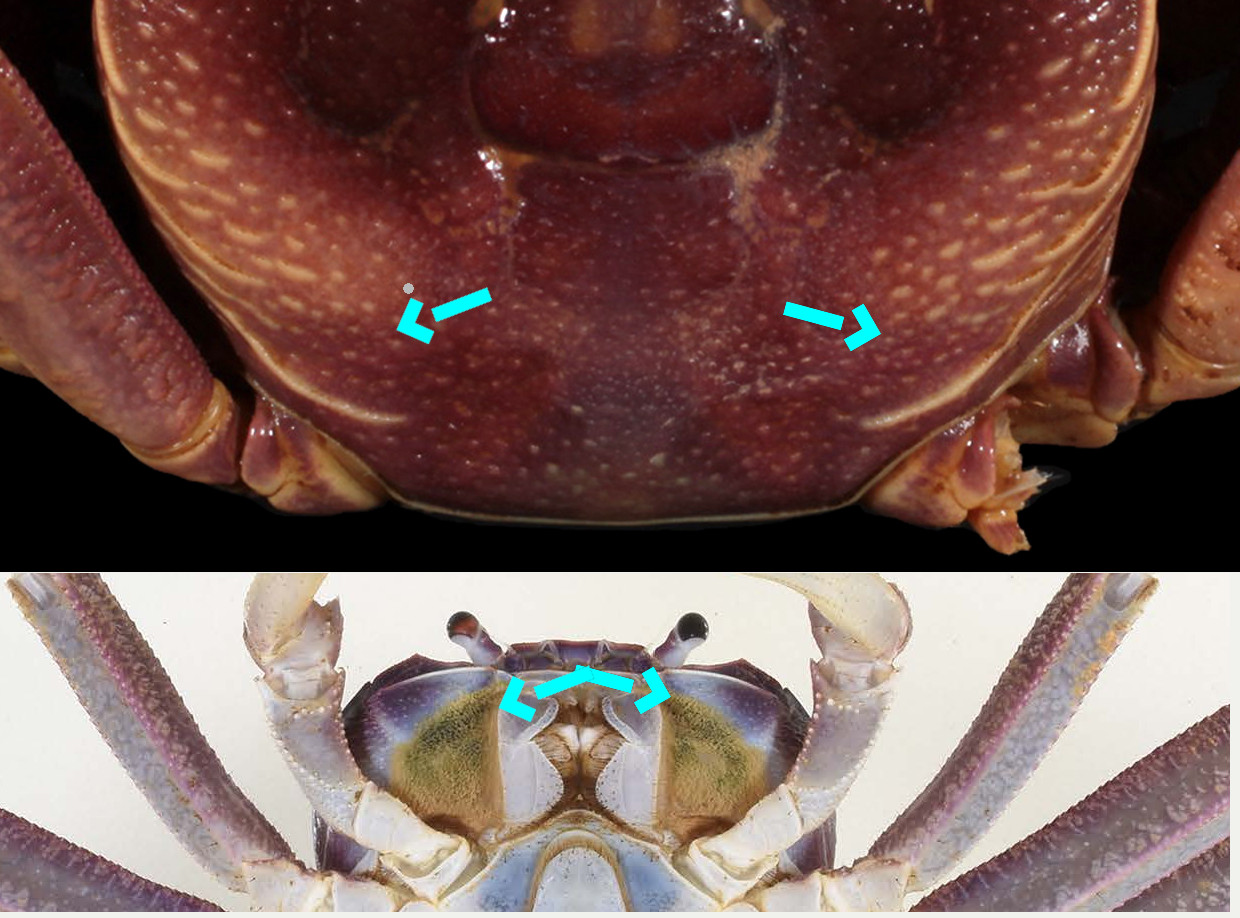
Top: "the posterolateral edges of the carapace have prominent diagonal grooves". Bottom: "the front corners of the underside of the carapace are densely covered with short, beige hairs".

=== Identification ===
Discoplax gracilipes is remarkable for its "extremely long" walking legs, with the length of the merus of the fourth walking leg sometimes exceeding the width of the crab's carapace. Other diagnostic characteristics are that the eye socket – the orbit – opens out on both sides; there is a file-like structure called the pars stridens on the lower edge of the socket, matched by a projection on the side of the cheliped which may rub the file to produce sound; finally, the upper edge of the socket bears several horizontal rows of small bumps.

== Distribution and habitat ==
Ng and Guinot noted in 2001 that Discoplax longipes had only been found so far on the Philippine isle of Panglao, which is abundant in anchialine caves and depressions. In 2010, the crabs were discovered in a limestone cave on Borocay in the Philippines; three years later they were also found living in Siquijor Island, also in the Philippines; and in 2023 they were found at Kawasan Falls on the isle of Cebu. In 2023, a paper published in Species Diversity reported the discovery of a single crab from an anchialine pool in Japan's Hateruma Island, near Taiwan. The crab was collected with a bait trap in a warm and mostly shallow tide pool in a cave. The authors identified the crab as D. gracilipes, thereby extending the known range northward by 1400 kilometres.

The crabs live in warm, shallow cave pools both rocky and muddy. D. gracilipes is known to coexist with many other species of crab both aquatic and terrestrial, but also with Eleotris fish, moray eels, small aquatic crustaceans, and, in the dry parts of its caves, bats and wood cockroaches. The dry parts of its caves have been recorded to be home to the crabs Gecarcoidea lalandii, (Note: Cave entrance; common outside) Geograpsus crinipes, Karstarma boholano, Sesarmoides, and Tuerkayana hirtipes, while the pools are also inhabited by Orcovita miruku, Orcovita fictilia, and Tuerkayana rotundum.

== Behaviour ==
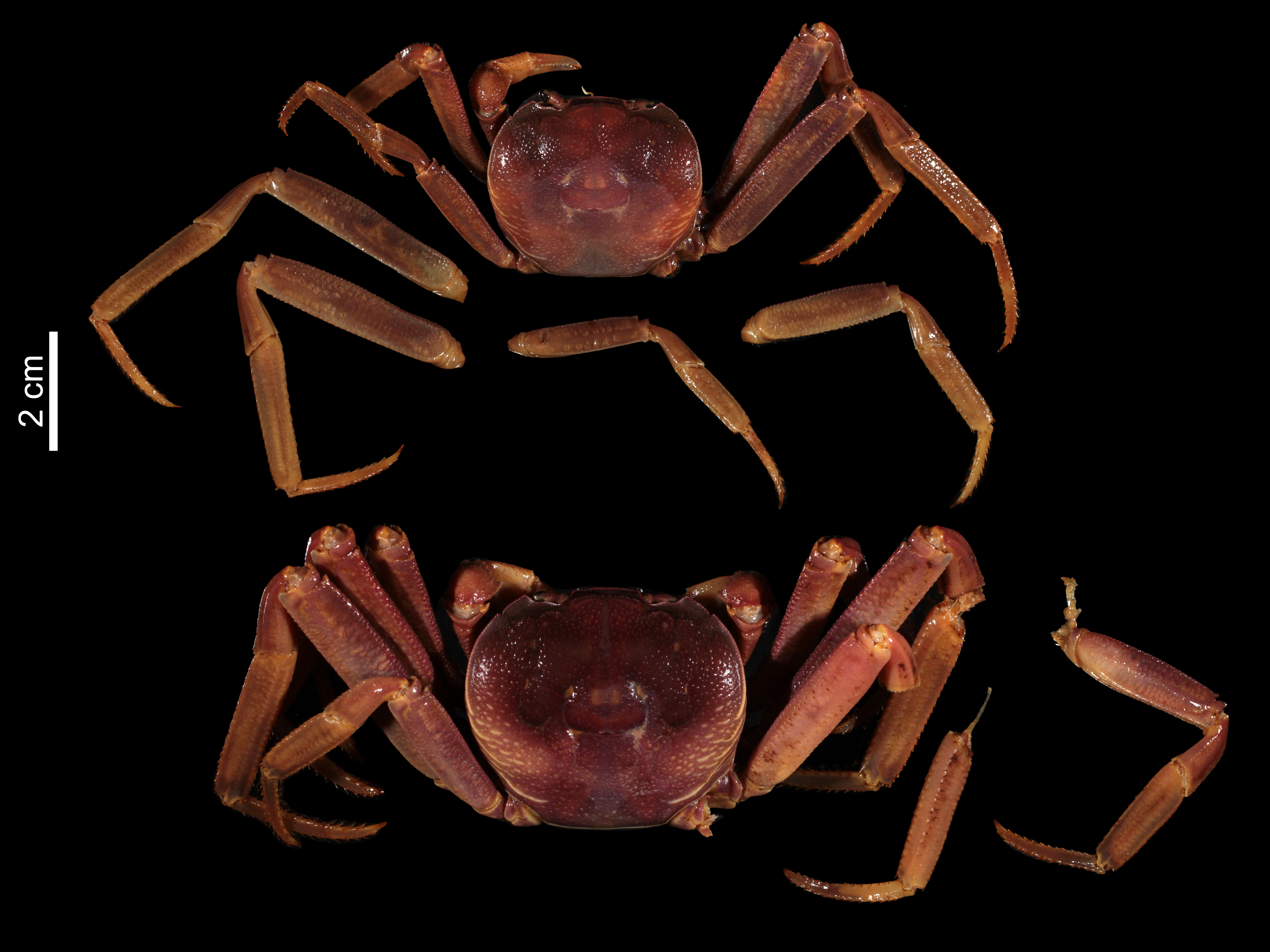
Paratype specimen kept in the French National Museum of Natural History.

In Panglao, the crabs shelter in the darkness of the caves during the daytime and then emerge to forage for food during the night, but observations of the crabs on Siquijor showed them active and foraging during the day. In Panglao the crabs mainly forage around the mouth of their caves and in nearby woodland. Land crabs on the island are often caught by locals, with D. gracilipes being no exception. The females have been observed leaving their caves and crossing land to release their eggs in the sea. The related species Discoplax longipes behaves similarly.

== General references ==
The following sources were consulted to help gloss and define technical terms for crab anatomy:

- Davie, Peter J.F. (2021). "Anatomy and physiology". Crabs: a global natural history. Princeton University Press. pp. 60–76. ISBN 978-0-691-20171-9.
- Martin, Joel. "Crustacea Glossary Complete List". Natural History Museum of Los Angeles County.
