= Moon crab =

Moon crab can refer to several crab taxa:

- Matutidae – Family of crabs

Some species of land crabs including;

- Gecarcinus [species]:
  - Gecarcinus quadratus from coastal Pacific regions between Mexico and Ecuador
  - Gecarcinus lateralis from coastal Atlantic regions between Florida and Guyana
- Cardisoma [species]:
  - C. armatum from Africa
  - C. carnifex from Africa and the Indo-Pacific
  - C. crassum and C. guanhumi from the Americas
