= Blue land crab =

The common name blue land crab can be applied to either of two terrestrial crab species:

- Tuerkayana celeste, from Christmas Island
- Cardisoma guanhumi, from the Atlantic coast of the Americas, also known as the giant blue land crab.
