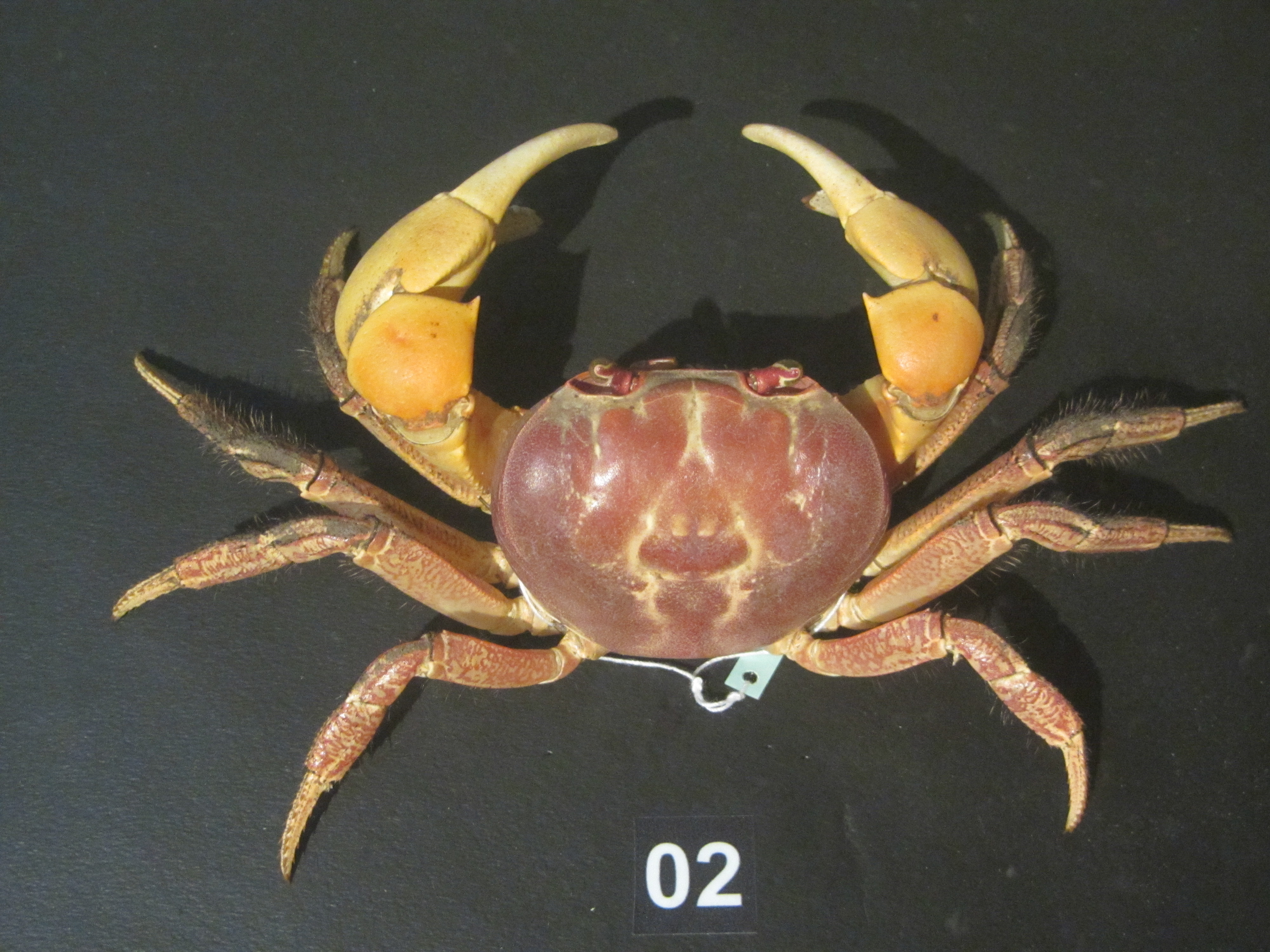

Scientific classification
- Domain: Eukaryota
- Kingdom: Animalia
- Phylum: Arthropoda
- Class: Malacostraca
- Order: Decapoda
- Suborder: Pleocyemata
- Infraorder: Brachyura
- Family: Gecarcinidae
- Genus: Tuerkayana
- Species: T. hirtipes

Binomial name
- Tuerkayana hirtipes (Dana, 1851)

Synonyms
- Cardiosoma hirtipes Dana, 1851; Discoplex hirtipes

= Tuerkayana hirtipes =

Species of crab

Tuerkayana hirtipes is a species of terrestrial crab.

== Description and behaviour ==
T. hirtipes can be distinguished from members of the genus Discoplax by the smooth and distinctly inflated carapace. It is also blue or blue-brown in colour, compared to purple or purple-brown in the remaining species.

The breeding season for T. hirtipes lasts seven months, and females must migrate to the sea to release their larvae.

== Distribution ==
T. hirtipes has a wide distribution across the western Pacific Ocean. It has been recorded from southern Japan, Taiwan, southern China, Palau, Guam, eastern Australia, Fiji, Hawaii (a single record, almost certainly erroneous), the Solomon Islands, New Caledonia, the Philippines, Indonesia, Vietnam, Malaysia and Singapore. Records from the Indian Ocean are now considered to belong to two related species, T. celeste (Christmas Island only) and D. magna (relatively widespread in eastern Indian Ocean).

== Taxonomic history ==
Tuerkayana hirtipes was originally described by James Dwight Dana under the name Cardisoma hirtipes. His description was published in 1851 based on material collected on the United States Exploring Expedition ("Wilkes expedition") in Fiji. The type material has been lost, so a neotype from Fiji was designated in 2012.

In late 2018, a re-examination of the taxonomy of Gecarcinidae resulted in the creation of the genus Tuerkayana, which was created with four species from Cardisoma and Discoplax, including hirtipes.
