= Mouthless crab =

Mouthless crab may refer to either of two species of terrestrial crab:

- Cardisoma crassum, found in the eastern coastal Pacific from Baja California to Peru
- Gecarcinus quadratus, also called the Halloween crab
