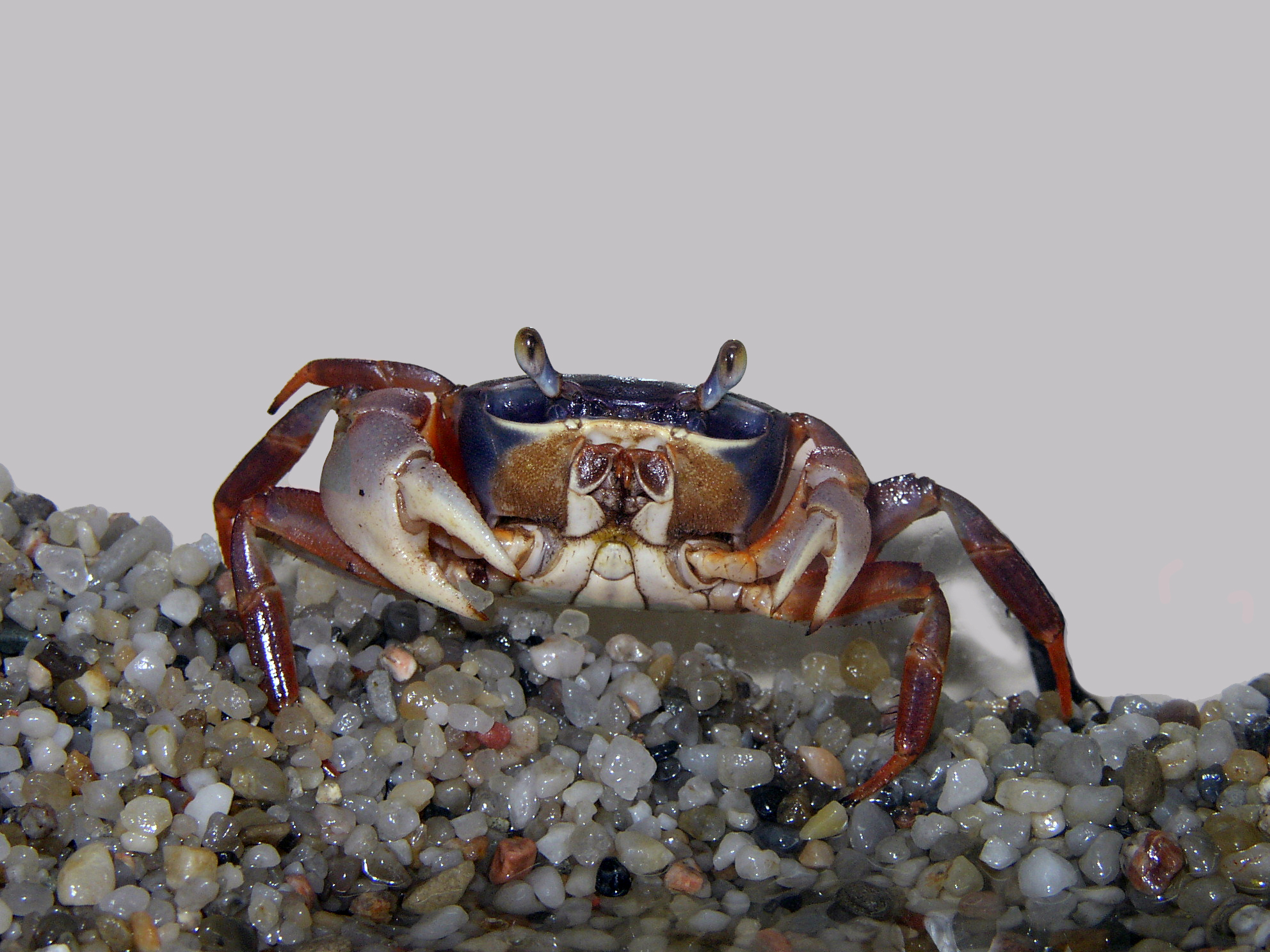

Scientific classification
- Domain: Eukaryota
- Kingdom: Animalia
- Phylum: Arthropoda
- Class: Malacostraca
- Order: Decapoda
- Suborder: Pleocyemata
- Infraorder: Brachyura
- Family: Gecarcinidae
- Genus: Cardisoma
- Species: C. armatum

Binomial name
- Cardisoma armatum Herklots, 1851

= Cardisoma armatum =

Species of crab

Cardisoma armatum is a species of terrestrial crab.

== Names ==
It is sometimes referred to as the (African) rainbow crab, (Nigerian) moon crab, or patriot crab. Adults are sometimes labelled as "soapdish" crabs in the pet industry. This name derives from their aggressive nature as adults and when being shipped to pet stores, they are often packed in soap dishes to prevent them from killing each other. The names moon crab and soapdish crab are sometimes applied to other similar crab species, leading to frequent confusion with other colourful crabs such as the three remaining species of Cardisoma, Gecarcinus ruricola, and G. quadratus (all except C. carnifex from the Americas).

== Distribution ==
C. armatum originates from coastal regions of western Africa, but it also occurs inland along some deltas (e.g. the Volta River delta), and on islands such as Cape Verde.

== Description ==
When young, these crabs typically have a blueish/violet carapace, red–colored legs, and whitish claws. This coloration usually fades as the animal grows older. They can reach a carapace size of 20 cm across, although captive individuals rarely reach this size.

== Ecology and life cycle ==
Their diet consists mainly of fruit, vegetation, and carrion. They are known to be cannibalistic, and consume smaller crabs, small reptiles and amphibians, molluscs, fish, and insects if they can catch them. While juvenile and adult crabs spend most of their time on dry land, the females must return to the ocean to release their eggs. The eggs hatch into microscopic larvae, and later on develop into young crabs. If the young do not make landfall by the time they are fully developed, they will drown. This land crab cannot remain submerged for long periods.
