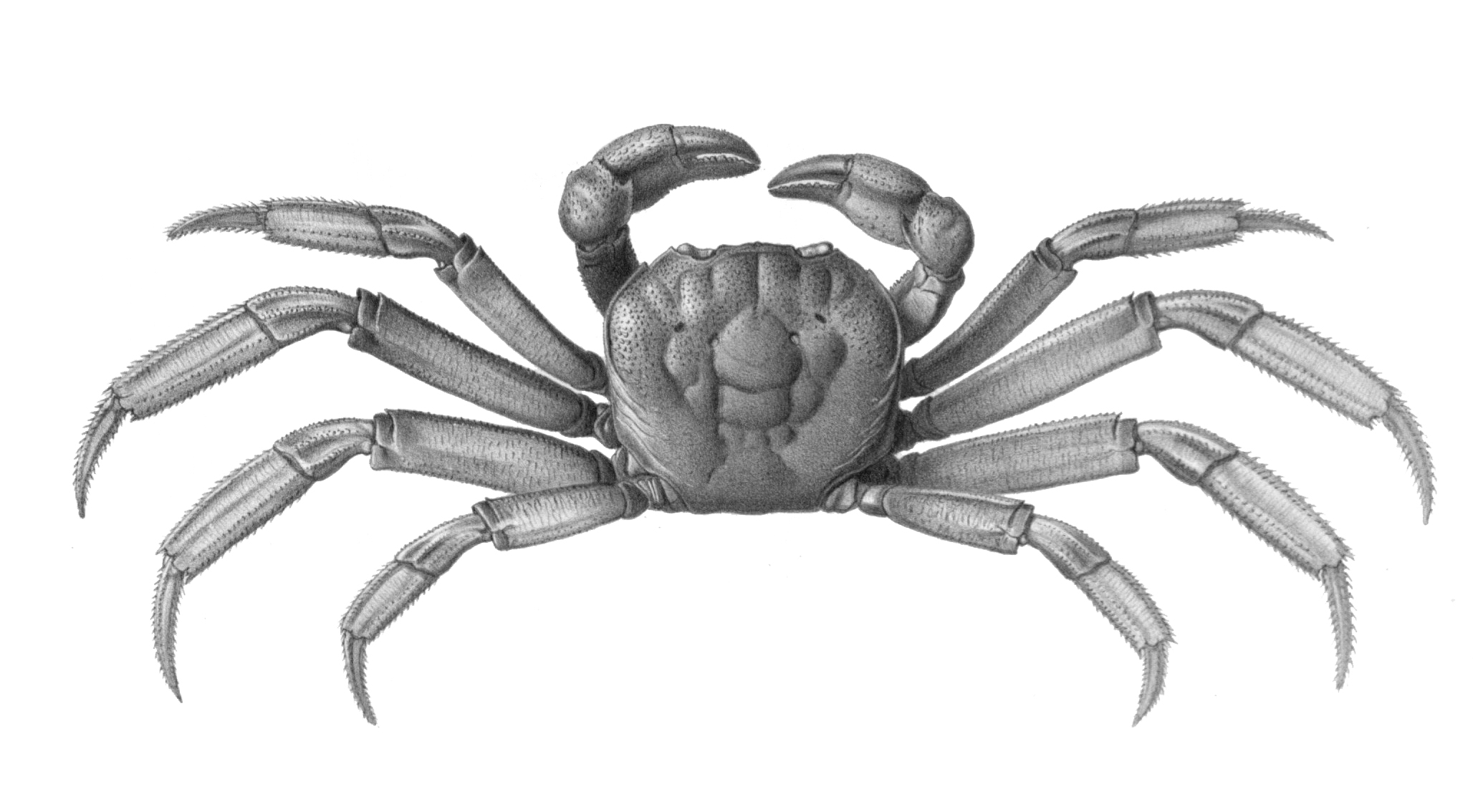

Scientific classification
- Domain: Eukaryota
- Kingdom: Animalia
- Phylum: Arthropoda
- Class: Malacostraca
- Order: Decapoda
- Suborder: Pleocyemata
- Infraorder: Brachyura
- Family: Gecarcinidae
- Genus: Discoplax
- Species: D. longipes

Binomial name
- Discoplax longipes A. Milne Edwards, 1867

Synonyms
- Cardisoma longipes A. Milne-Edwards, 1867

= Discoplax longipes =

Species of crab

Discoplax longipes is a species of terrestrial crab. It is found in karstic caves on Pacific islands and ranges from the Loyalty Islands to French Polynesia (the Guam population was recognized as a separate species, D. michalis, in 2015). Mating occurs in the caves, after which the females migrate to the sea to release their fertilised eggs. The genus Discoplax was for a long time synonymised with Cardisoma, but was resurrected in the late 20th century.
