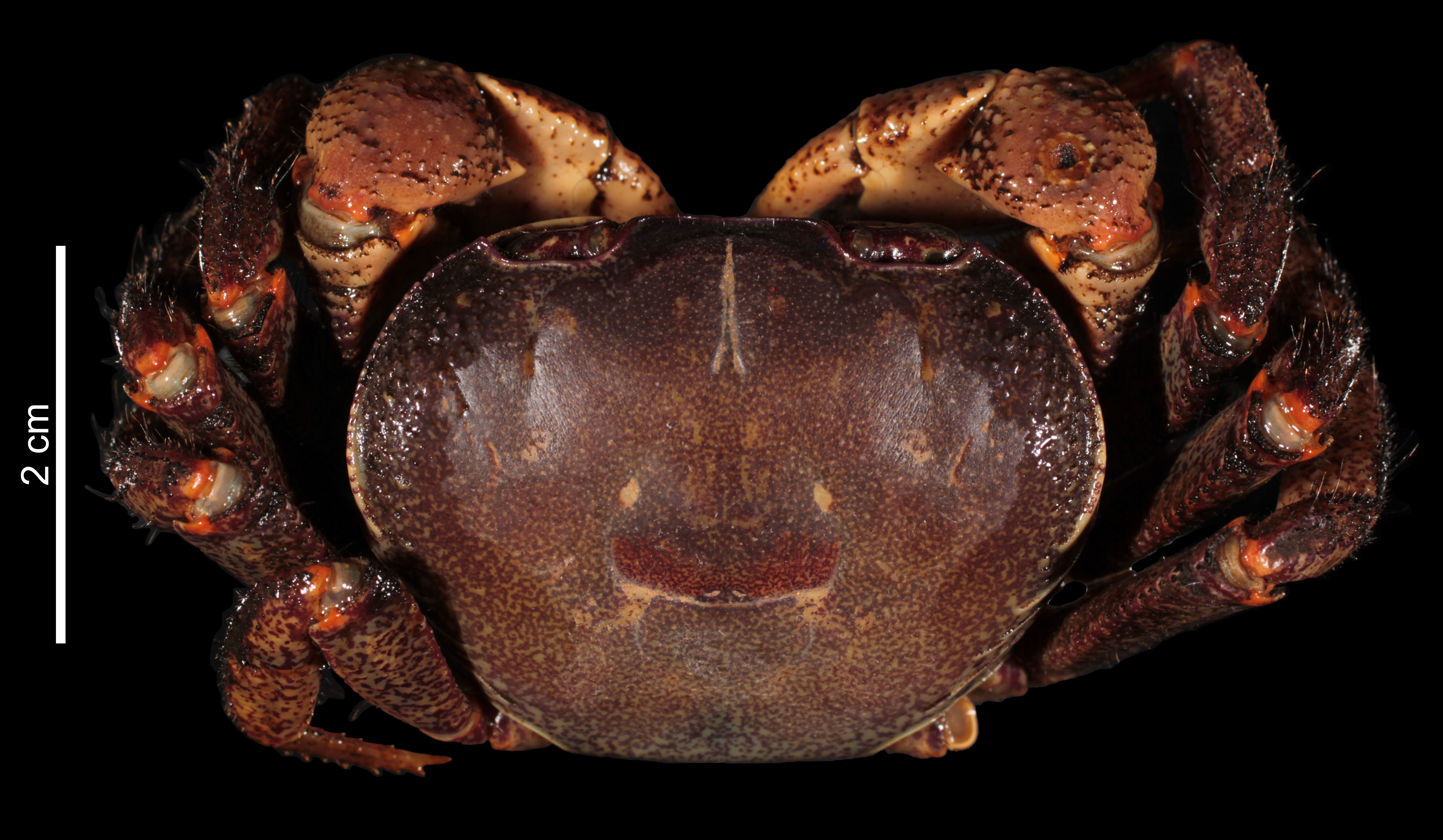
- Tuerkayana rotundum

Scientific classification
- Domain: Eukaryota
- Kingdom: Animalia
- Phylum: Arthropoda
- Class: Malacostraca
- Order: Decapoda
- Suborder: Pleocyemata
- Infraorder: Brachyura
- Family: Gecarcinidae
- Genus: Tuerkayana

Type species
- Tuerkayana rotundum (Quay & Gaimard, 1824)

= Tuerkayana =

Genus of crabs

Tuerkayana is a genus of large land crabs. It was created from two members of the genus Cardisoma and two members of Discoplax in late 2018 after a re-examination of the taxonomy of the family Gecarcinidae. Said re-examination also resulted in the creation of the new family Leptograpsodidae for the genus Leptograpsodes.

== Species ==
The genus Tuerkayana comprises the following species:

- Tuerkayana celeste (Ng & Guinot, 2001)
- Tuerkayana hirtipes (Dana, 1851)
- Tuerkayana latens Ng & Shih, 2023
- Tuerkayana magnum (Ng & Shih, 2015)
- Tuerkayana rotundum (Quay & Gaimard, 1824)
