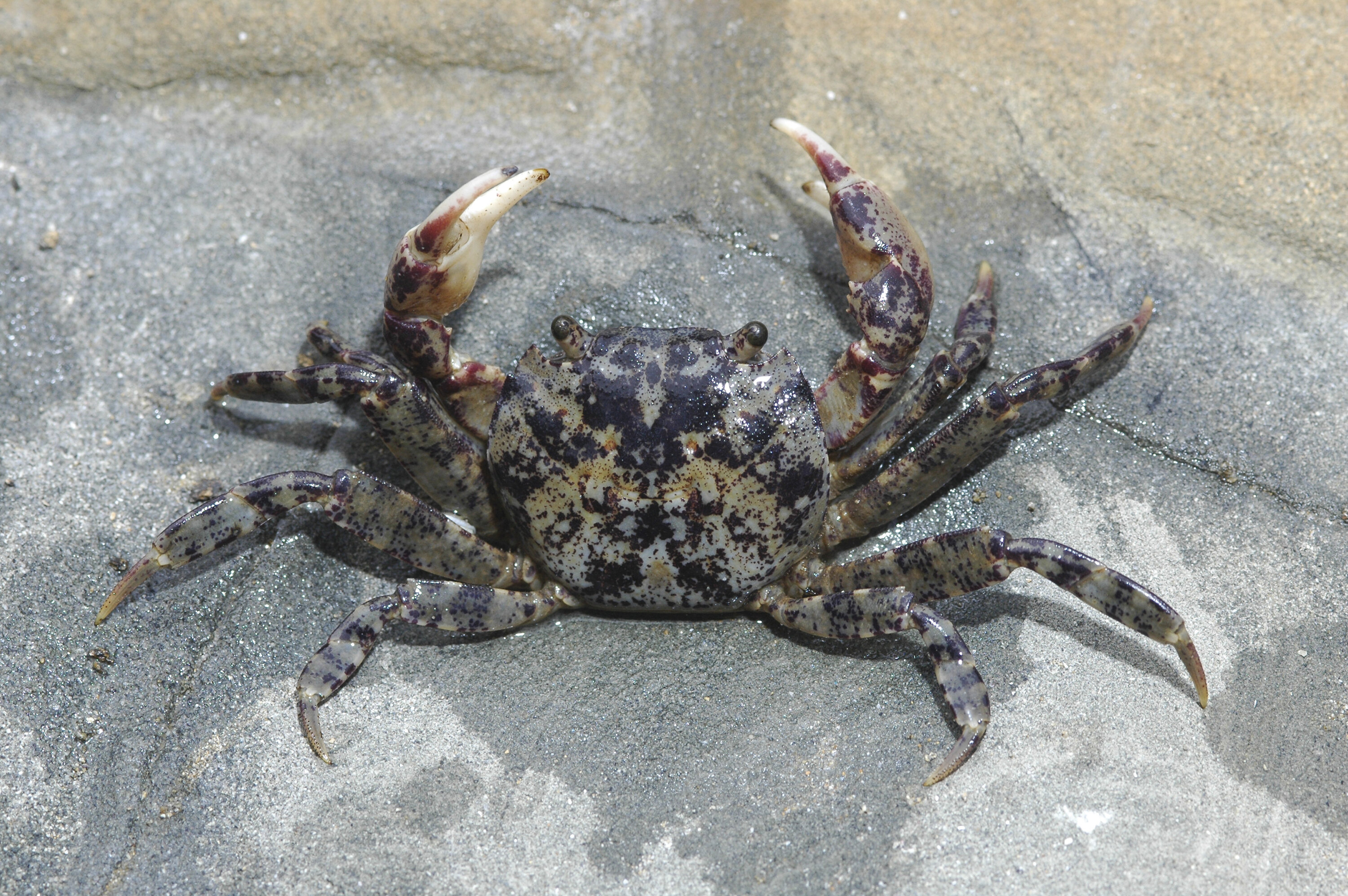

Scientific classification
- Kingdom: Animalia
- Phylum: Arthropoda
- Clade: Pancrustacea
- Class: Malacostraca
- Order: Decapoda
- Suborder: Pleocyemata
- Infraorder: Brachyura
- Family: Leptograpsodidae; Guinot, Ng & Rodríguez Moreno, 2018
- Genus: Leptograpsodes; Montgomery, 1931
- Species: L. octodentatus

Binomial name
- Leptograpsodes octodentatus (H. Milne Edwards, 1837)

Synonyms
- List: Cyclograpsus octodentatus H. Milne Edwards, 1837; Grapsus inornatus Hess, 1865; Heterograpsus octodentatus (H. Milne Edwards, 1837); Leptograpsodes webhaysi Montgomery, 1931

= Leptograpsodes =

Burrowing shore crab

Species of crab

Leptograpsodes octodentatus, known as the burrowing shore crab, is a species of crab in the superfamily Grapsoidea, It is the only species in the genus Leptograpsodes, and the family Leptograpsodidae.

== Description ==
It is up to 60 to 70 mm (2.4 to 2.8 in) across, with an oval shaped carapace. The species epithet octodentatus refers to four pairs of teeth (including the orbital angle) on the sides of the carapace, although the fourth is very small. Some references list one tooth only. Color varies with the carapace described as grey and yellow, mottled green and brown, purple and yellow. It can produce sound by stridulation.

=== Sexual dimorphism ===
Adult males have large claws with curved fingers, with irregular teeth, whereas in females and juveniles the fingers are straight, with regular teeth. These differences caused them to originally be given multiple species names.

== Environment ==
It is typically found on southern Australian seashores in Victoria, Tasmania, South Australia and Western Australia (north to the Abrolhos islands), and tends to live near fresh or brackish water, but never far from the shore. It lives in shallow burrows, above the high tide line, and comes out to feed at night, on rotting vegetation and animal debris. Spawning is in summer from December to January.
