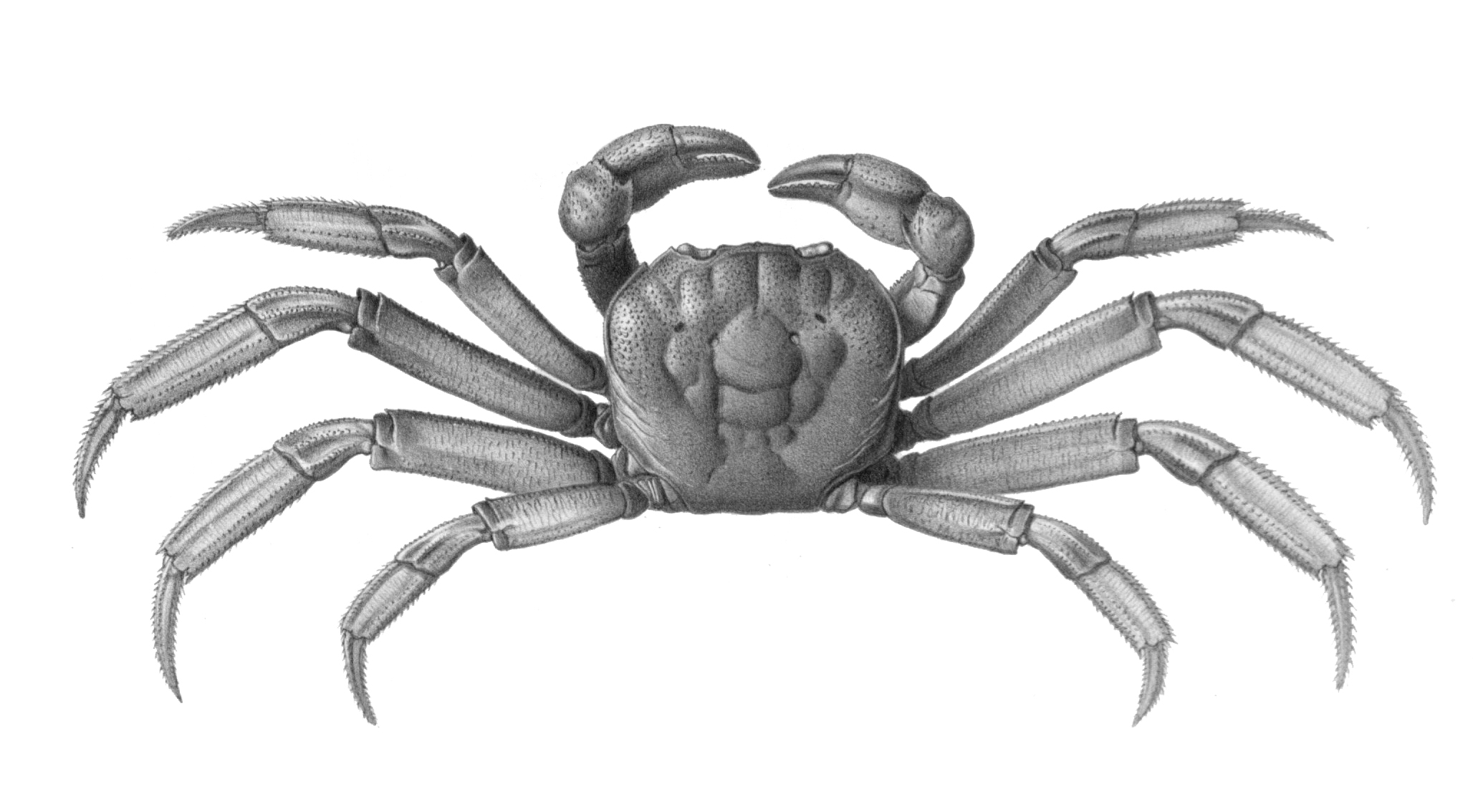
- Discoplax longipes

Scientific classification
- Domain: Eukaryota
- Kingdom: Animalia
- Phylum: Arthropoda
- Class: Malacostraca
- Order: Decapoda
- Suborder: Pleocyemata
- Infraorder: Brachyura
- Family: Gecarcinidae
- Genus: Discoplax; A. Milne-Edwards, 1867

= Discoplax =

Genus of crabs

Discoplax is a genus of terrestrial crabs. It is very closely related to the genera Cardisoma and Tuerkayana.

Discoplax contains the following species:

- Discoplax gracilipes Ng & Guinot, 2001
- Discoplax longipes A. Milne-Edwards, 1867
- Discoplax michalis Ng & Shih, 2015
