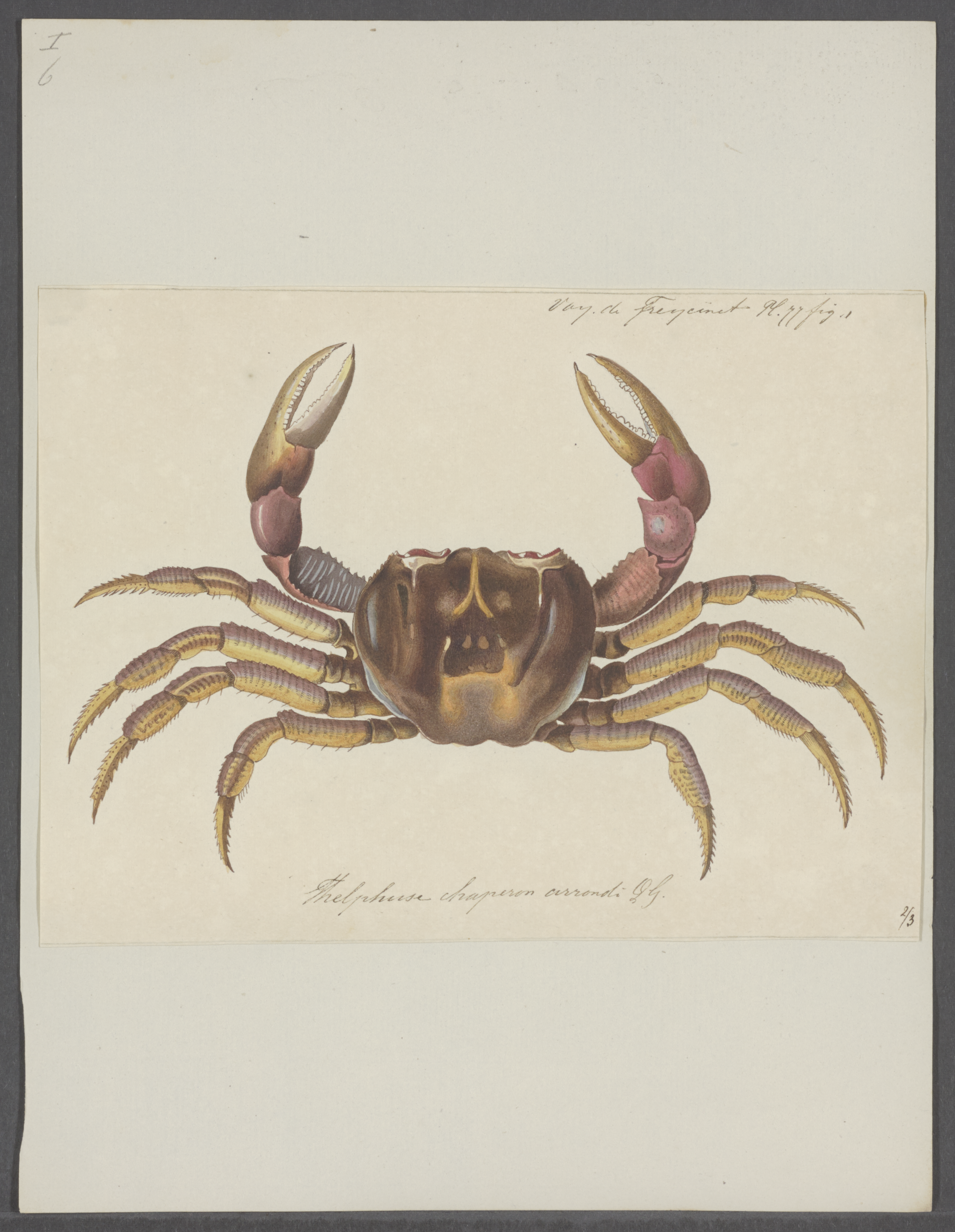

Scientific classification
- Kingdom: Animalia
- Phylum: Arthropoda
- Clade: Pancrustacea
- Class: Malacostraca
- Order: Decapoda
- Suborder: Pleocyemata
- Infraorder: Brachyura
- Family: Gecarcinidae
- Genus: Tuerkayana
- Species: T. rotundum

Binomial name
- Tuerkayana rotundum (Quoy & Gaimard, 1824)

Synonyms
- Cardisoma frontalis H. Milne-Edwards, 1853; Cardisoma rotundum (Quoy & Gaimard, 1824); Discoplax pagenstecheri Kossmann, 1878; Discoplax rotunda (Quoy & Gaimard, 1824); Thelphusa rotunda Quoy & Gaimard, 1824

= Tuerkayana rotundum =

Species of crab

Tuerkayana rotundum is a species of land crab in the family Gecarcinidae found in the Pacific Ocean.
