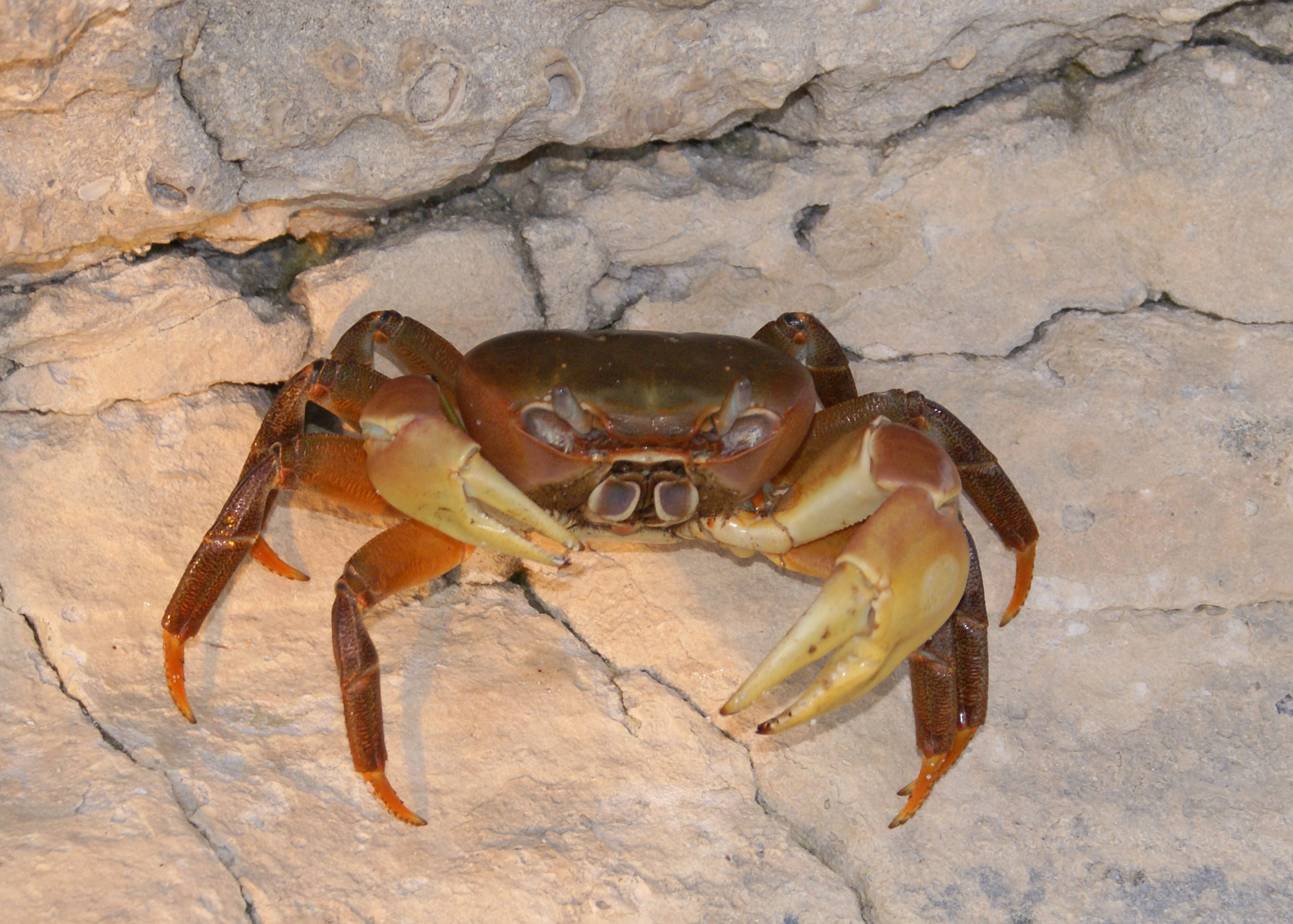

Scientific classification
- Kingdom: Animalia
- Phylum: Arthropoda
- Clade: Pancrustacea
- Class: Malacostraca
- Order: Decapoda
- Suborder: Pleocyemata
- Infraorder: Brachyura
- Family: Gecarcinidae
- Genus: Cardisoma
- Species: C. carnifex

Binomial name
- Cardisoma carnifex (Herbst, 1794)

Synonyms
- Cancer carnifex Herbst, 1794; Cardisoma obesum Dana, 1851; Cardisoma urvillei H. Milne-Edwards, 1853

= Cardisoma carnifex =

Species of crab

Cardisoma carnifex is a species of terrestrial crab found in coastal regions from the east coast of Africa and the Red Sea across the Indo-Pacific to the Line Islands and the Tuamotu Archipelago. The range includes parts of northern Australia and the Cocos (Keeling) Islands.

It is an omnivorous species whose diet includes a variety of plant and animal materials. It primarily consumes fallen leaves, fruits, seeds, and other forms of organic detritus. Sometimes, it may also prey on insects or small animals, reflecting its opportunistic feeding behavior.
