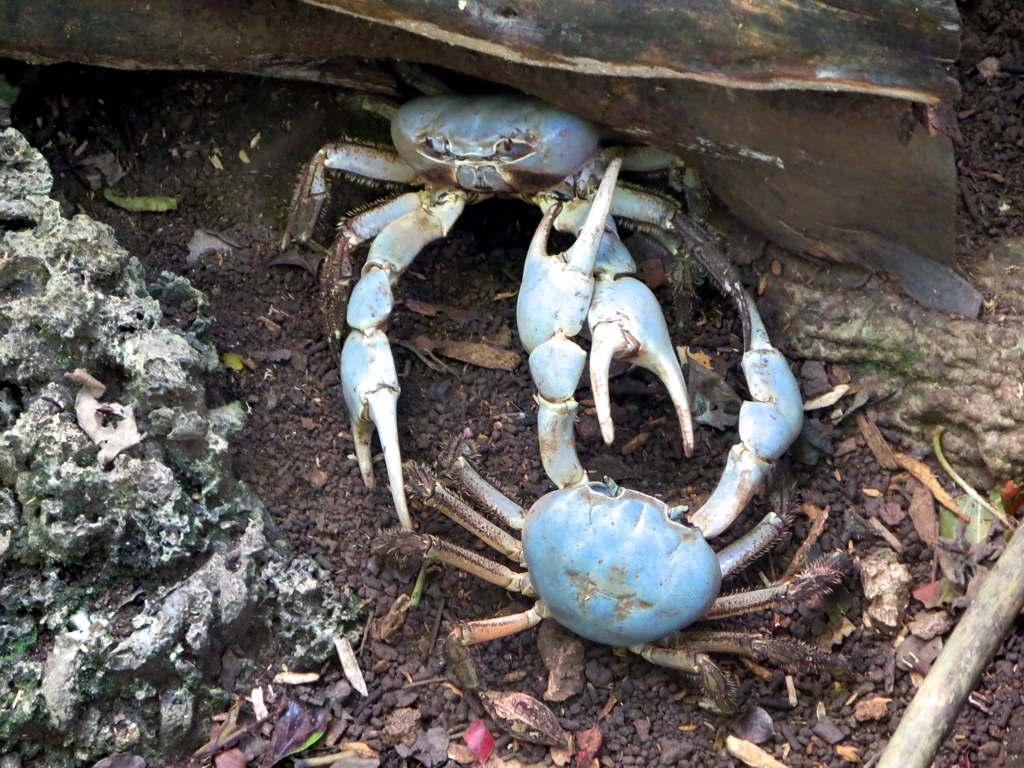

Scientific classification
- Kingdom: Animalia
- Phylum: Arthropoda
- Clade: Pancrustacea
- Class: Malacostraca
- Order: Decapoda
- Suborder: Pleocyemata
- Infraorder: Brachyura
- Family: Gecarcinidae
- Genus: Tuerkayana
- Species: T. celeste

Binomial name
- Tuerkayana celeste (Ng & Davie, 2012)

Synonyms
- Discoplax celeste Ng & Davie, 2012

= Tuerkayana celeste =

Species of crab

Tuerkayana celeste, known as the Christmas Island blue crab is a species of crab in the family Gecarcinidae. The species is only found near freshwater on Christmas Island. The species was first recorded in 1900 but only in 2012 was it found to be a separate species from Tuerkayana hirtipes. The species was used for food in the 1950s but was subsequently protected in 1980.

Its dependence on freshwater makes it particularly vulnerable to habitat disturbance, while invasive species pose an additional threat to its survival on Christmas Island.

== Description ==
The species is named "celeste" for the sky-blue colour of its carapace and claws, which develops only in adults. In form and behaviour it closely resembles T. hirtipes, and the two can be told apart mainly by colour and genetics. Both the blue crab and a purplish-brown form with orange claws, matching T. hirtipes elsewhere, occur on Christmas Island. The holotype, a male from Waterfall Bay, measured 106 mm (4.2 in) in carapace width.

This crab is less abundant than the Christmas Island red crab and has more aquatic habits, so it is restricted to areas with surface fresh water. Its burrows are usually dug in soft soil beside streams or among roots, and they are typically filled with water. Because it depends on freshwater habitat, the species has suffered more directly from human activities than the red crab. Habitat destruction and invasive species are increasing the risks it faces on the island.

== Taxonomy ==
The species was originally described as Discoplax celeste and was moved to the genus Tuerkayana by Guinot, Ng & Rodríguez Moreno in 2018. Before 2012 it was regarded as a colour variation of D. hirtipes.
