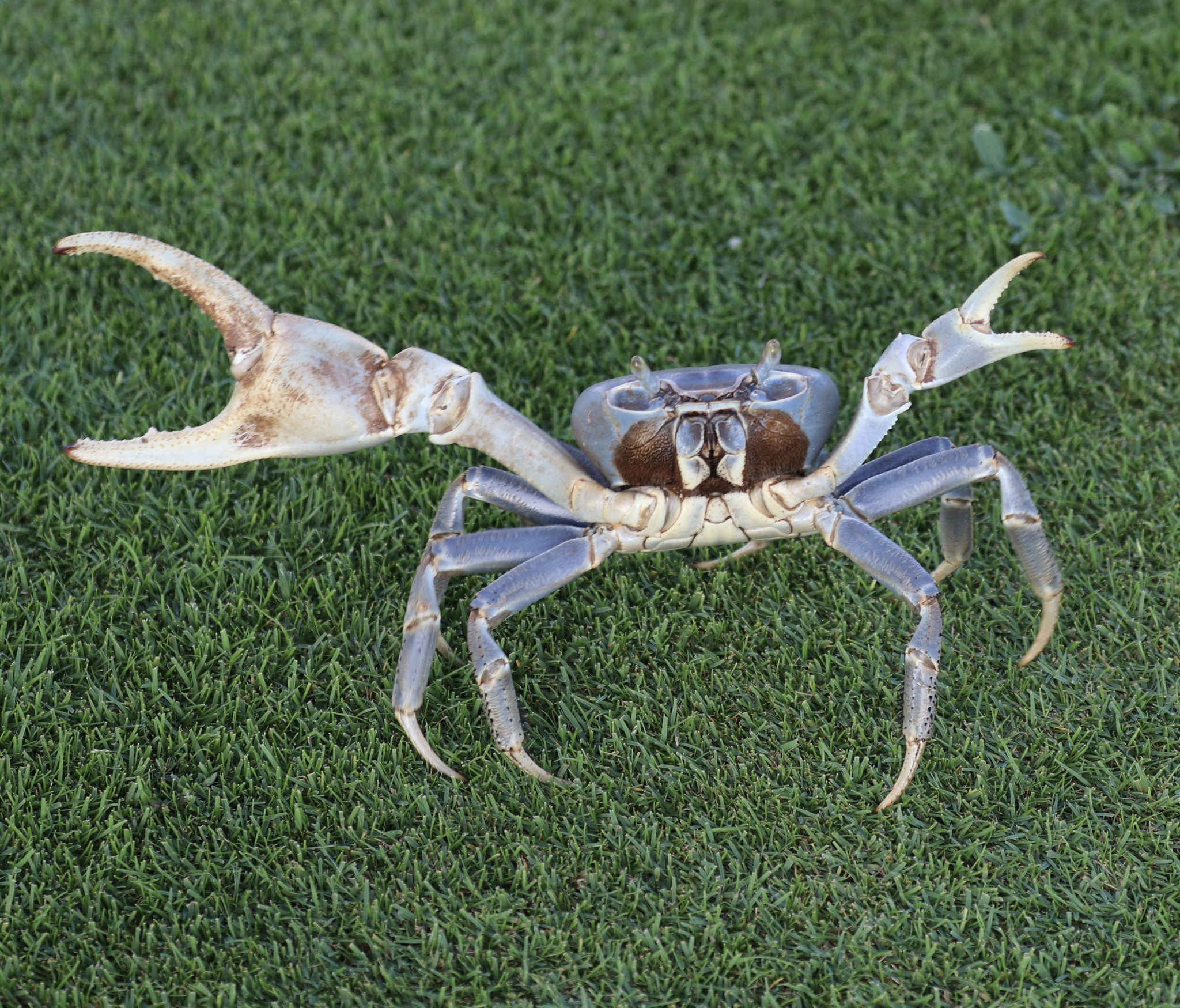
- Male

Scientific classification
- Kingdom: Animalia
- Phylum: Arthropoda
- Clade: Pancrustacea
- Class: Malacostraca
- Order: Decapoda
- Suborder: Pleocyemata
- Infraorder: Brachyura
- Family: Gecarcinidae
- Genus: Cardisoma
- Species: C. guanhumi

Binomial name
- Cardisoma guanhumi Latreille, 1828

= Cardisoma guanhumi =

Species of crustacean

Cardisoma guanhumi, also known as the blue land crab or great land crab, is a species of land crab found in tropical and subtropical estuaries and other maritime areas of land along the Atlantic coast of the Americas from Brazil and Colombia, through the Caribbean and Gulf of Mexico, to the Bahamas, and north to Ponce Inlet, Florida, Princess Place Preserve in Palm Coast, and Bermuda. The species varies in colour from dark blue to brown or pale grey, and may grow to 15 centimetres (6 in) in carapace width and weigh over 500 grams (18 oz).

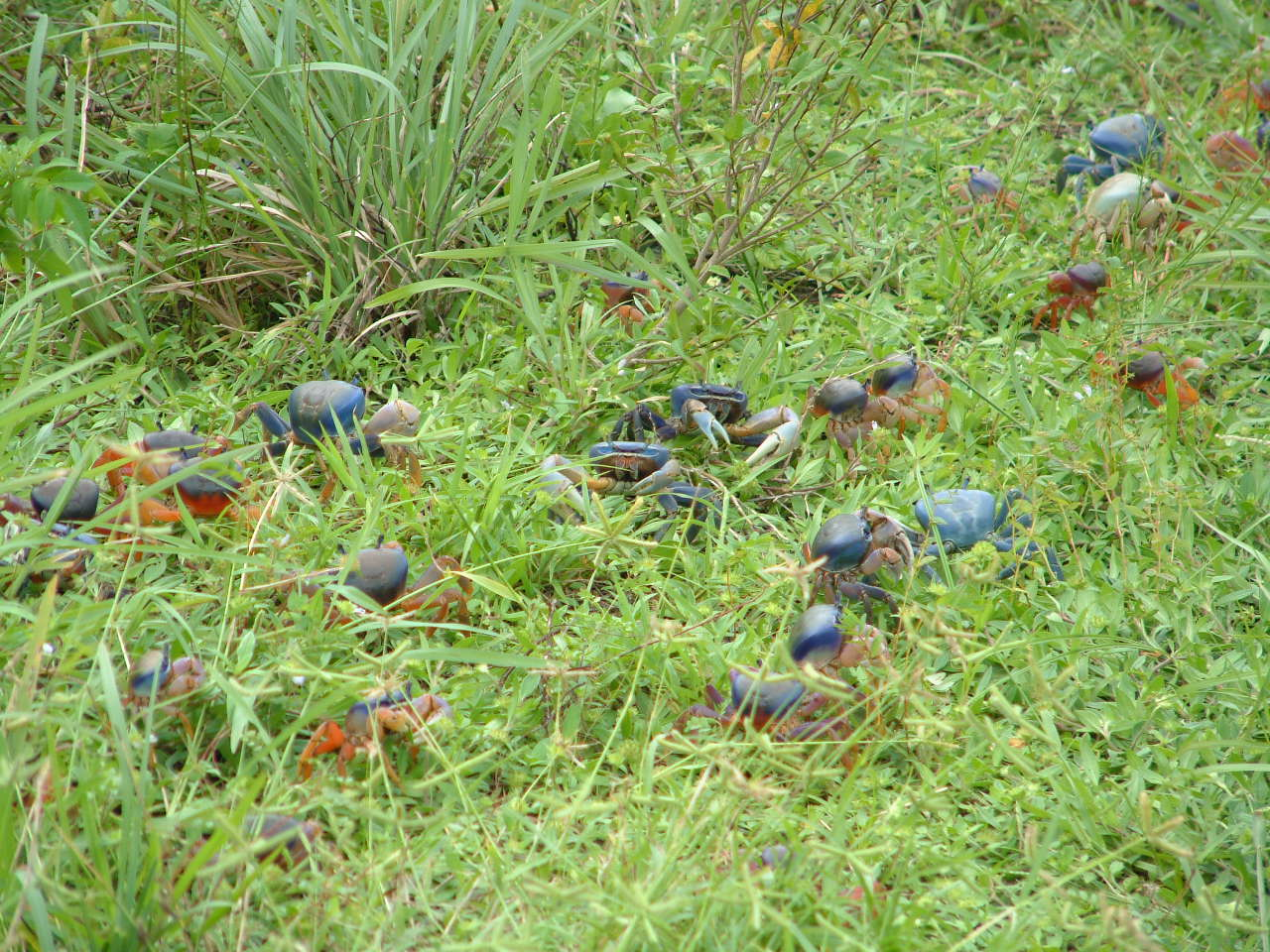
A group of blue land crabs

== Description ==
The carapace of Cardisoma guanhumi can reach a width up to 15 centimetres (6 inches). As with many crab species, males possess dimorphic claws; the larger claw can become longer than the carapace's width. The eyes are stalked and their colour ranges from a deep blue to a pale grey. Juveniles generally have a brown carapace with orange coloured legs. Females usually appear light gray or white. Adult colours are usually present between 80 grams (2.8 ounces) and 180 g (6.3 oz). Individuals of the species can weigh over 500 g (18 oz).

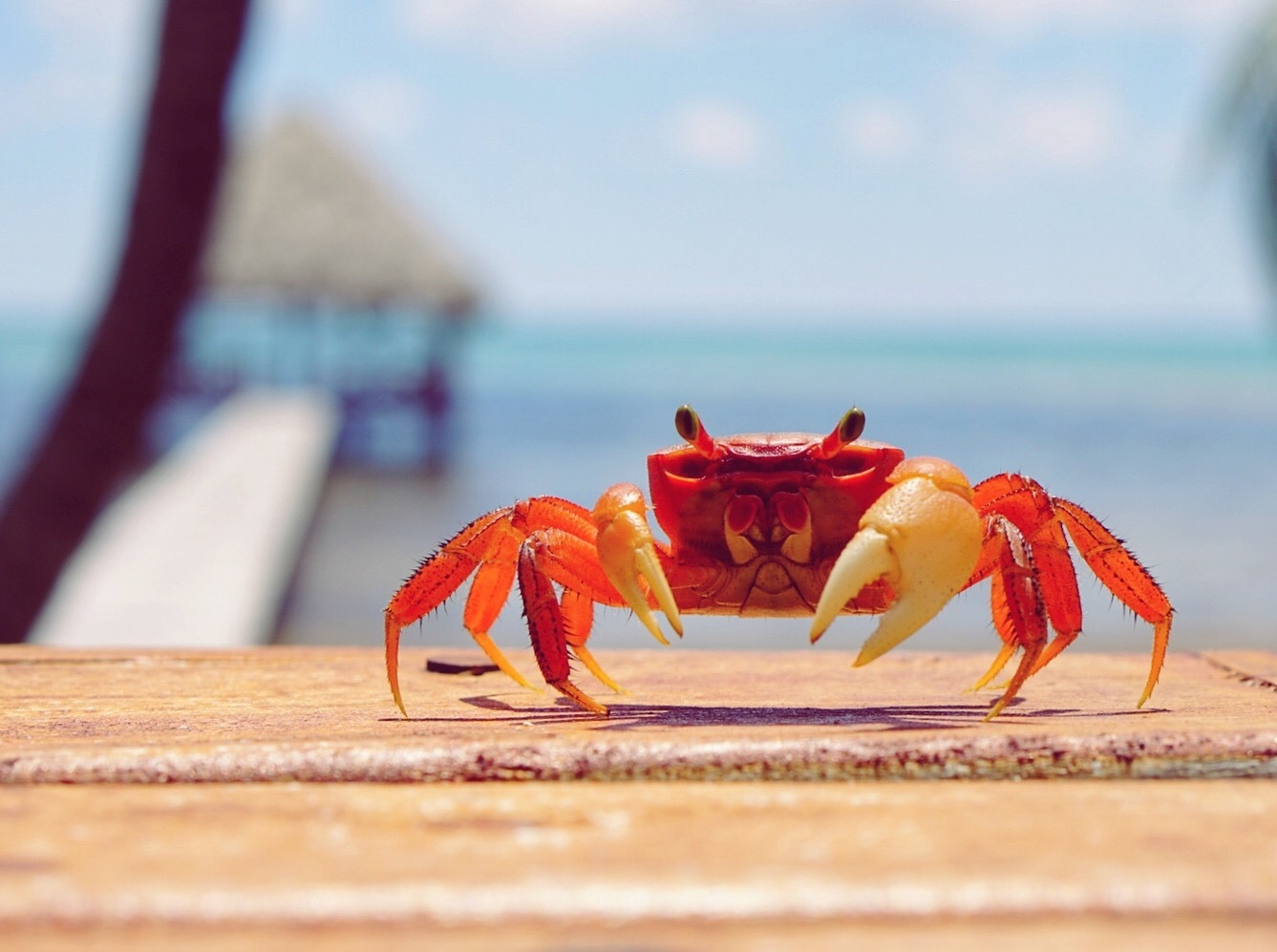
Juvenile

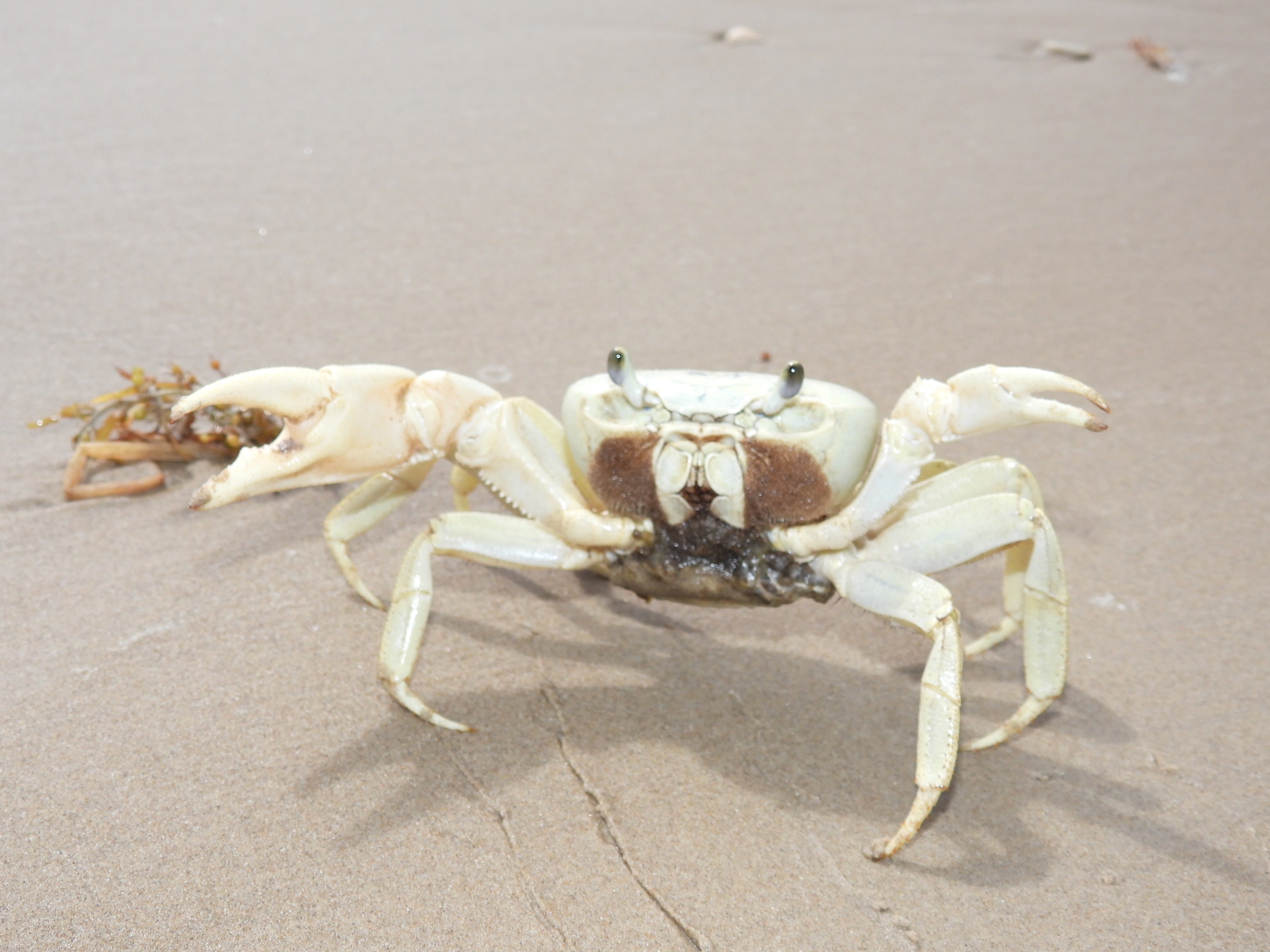
Gravid female, Texas

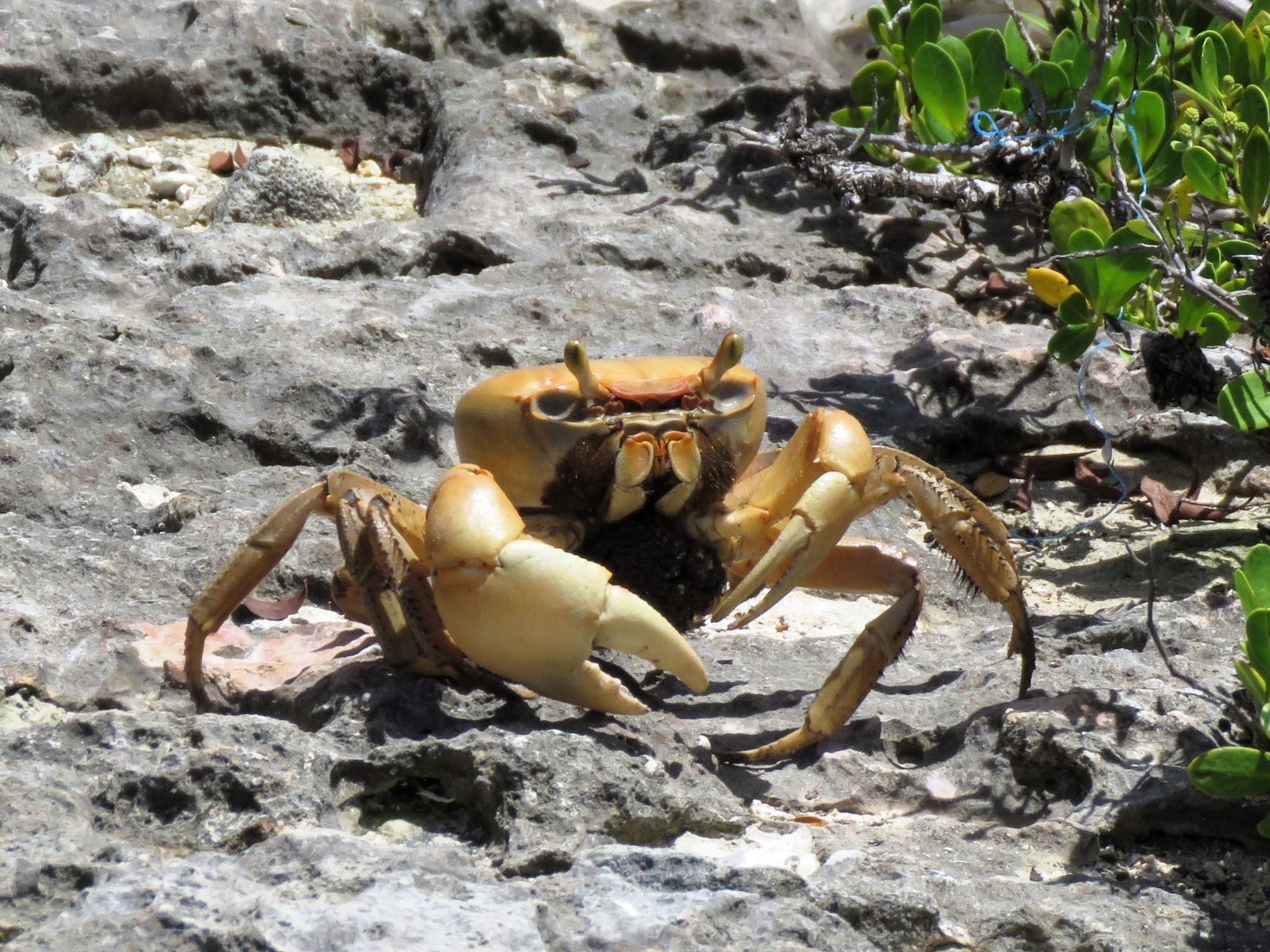
Gravid female, Trinidad

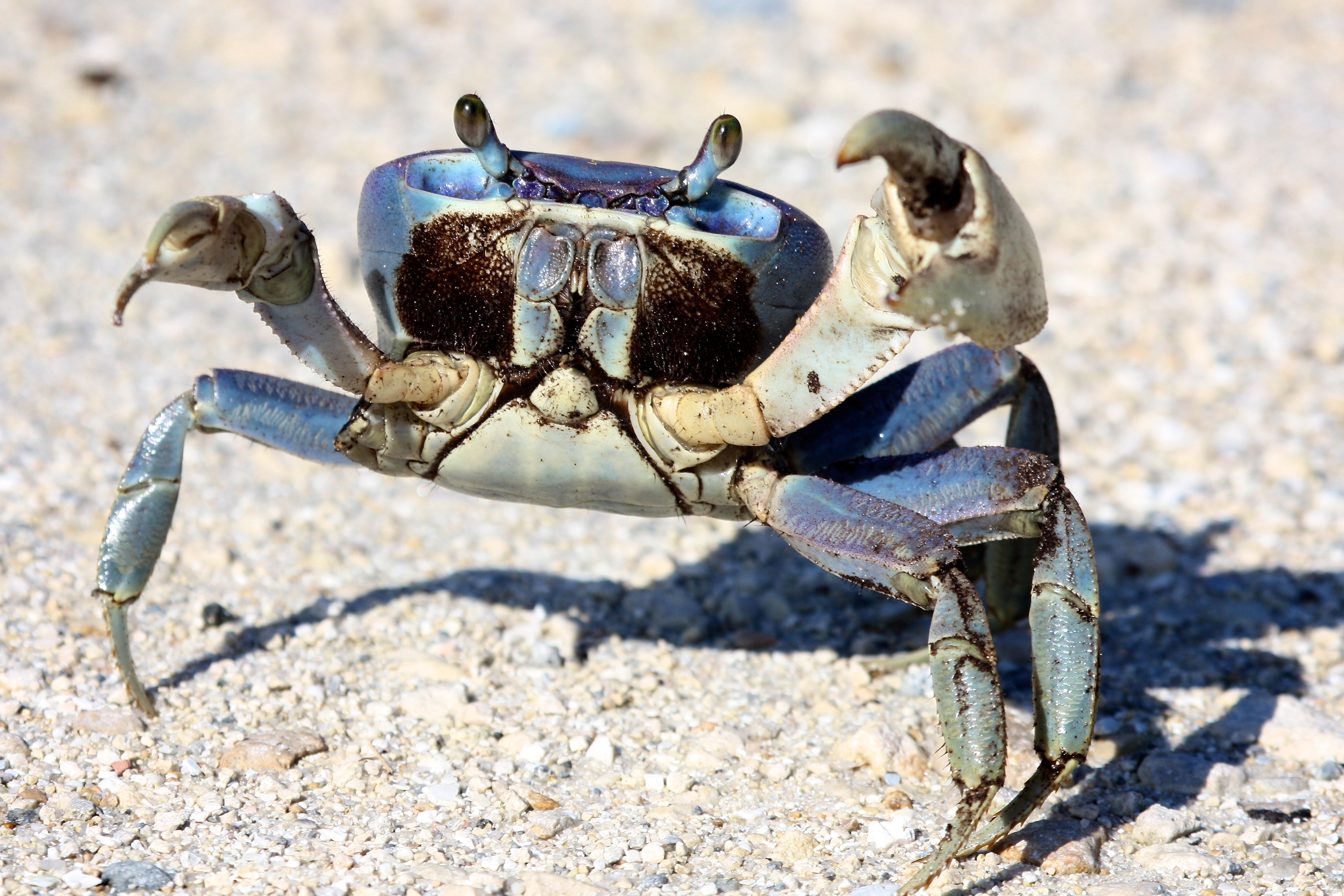
Blue coloured female, Florida

== Distribution ==
C. guanhumi is found throughout estuarine and other coastal regions of the Caribbean, and along the Atlantic coast of Central and South America (south to Brazil). In the United States it can be found in coastal areas of the Gulf of Mexico and Florida north to Vero Beach. Relatively cold water in the winter, less than 20 °C (68 °F), affects larval survival and restricts the species' possibility of spreading further north.

== Diet ==
In Everglades. Video clip

C. guanhumi is omnivorous, collecting and eating leaves and fruits close to its burrow whilst also eating insects and carrion. Like many crabs, this species is cannibalistic. They move in the shade during the day and will eschew moving in prolonged direct sunlight to feed at night instead.

== Senses ==
C. guanhumi finds its food using light and sound detectors. Experiments show that crabs can be drawn out of their burrows to investigate the sound of falling fruit, once out they initiate a search for food. Predatory behavior is released in these crabs by detection of small moving objects. Crabs in the genus Cardisoma are able to detect small vibrations on the ground within the range of 10–1500 Hz and 70 dB. Visual acuity increases with body size due to an increase in both the number and diameter of ommatidia.

== Life cycle ==
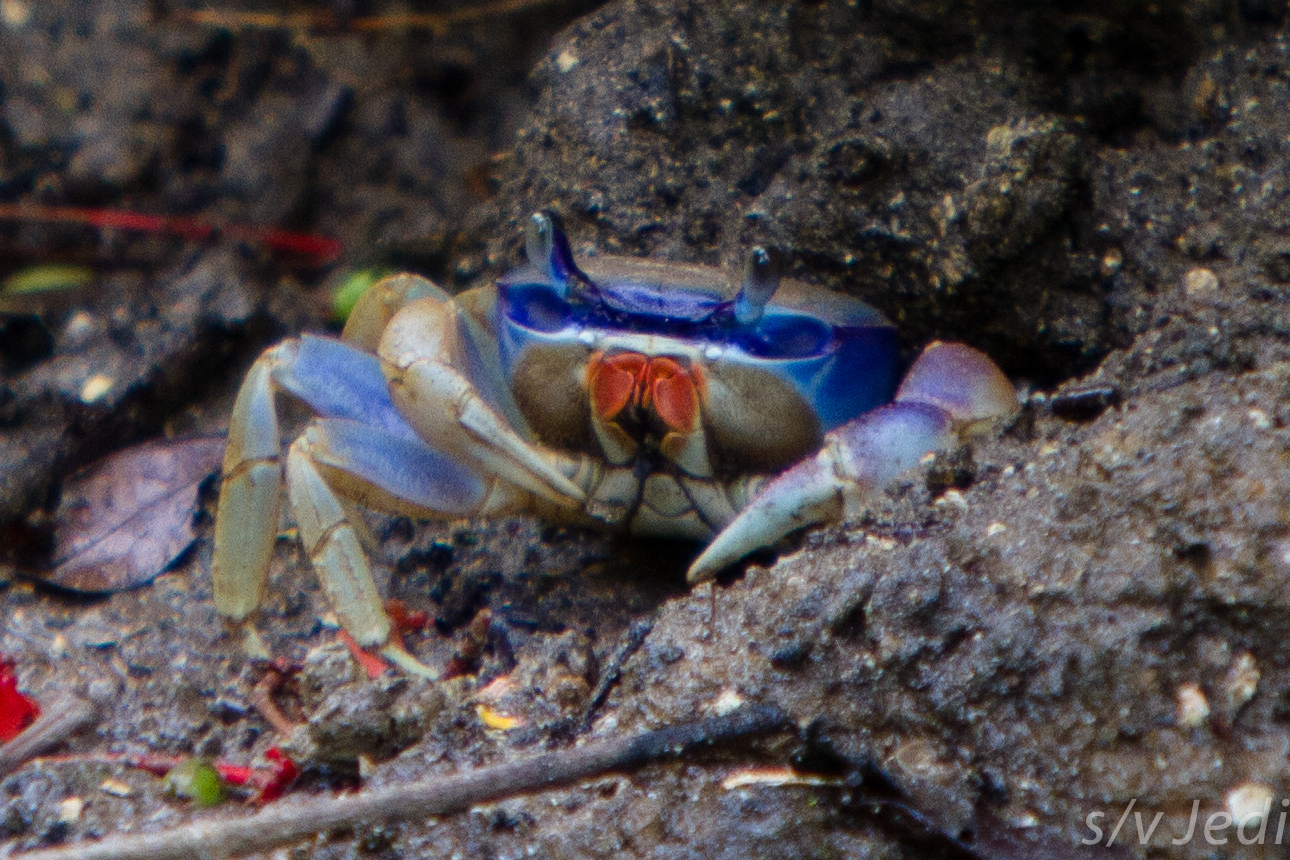
Guarding the burrow

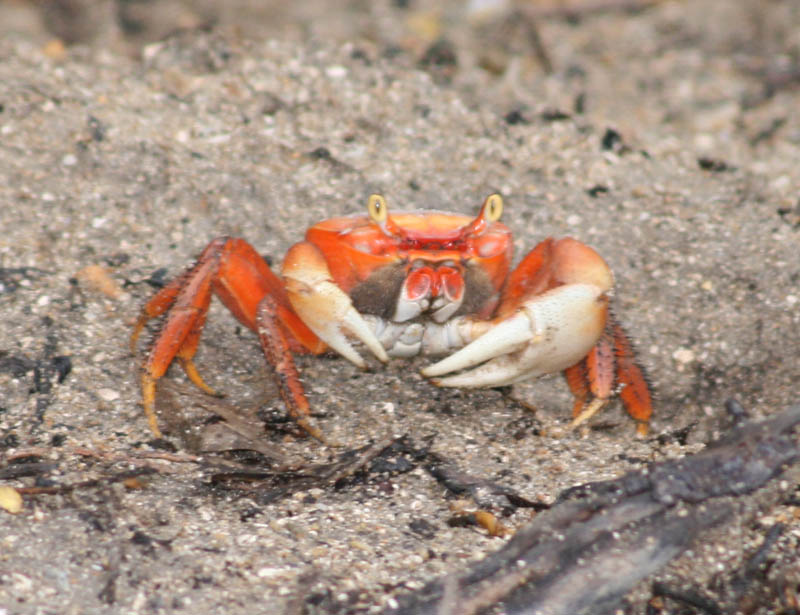
A juvenile blue land crab showing a different coloring

The reproductive cycle is closely linked to seasonal weather patterns and lunar phase. Heavy rains in the spring initiate migrations. When this occurs, C. guanhumi begins to gain weight, as more food is consumed and gathered for the first few weeks of the migratory period. Males mate with mature females during this time. Fertilization is internal, and throughout July and August most females carry the eggs externally. After approximately two weeks the eggs will hatch and must be released into saltwater for the larvae to survive. Several spawns per year may occur with spawning season varying with location within the range. In Florida, spawning season lasts from June to December and reaches its peak in October and November. In the Bahamas the season extends from July to September, while in Venezuela spawning lasts from July to November. Eggs hatch into free swimming larvae with five zoeal stages and one postlarval or megalopa stage. Typical development time from hatching to the first crabs stage is 42 days under laboratory conditions; however, this time may be much shorter in wild specimens.

C. guanhumi is a slow-growing species compared to most other crabs. It requires more than 60 molts – roughly three times more than other species of crab – to reach its full size. The crab will generally seal the exit to its burrow using mud, 6–10 days before it molts, to protect itself from predators. After molting, crabs are more vulnerable as their shell has not yet hardened.
