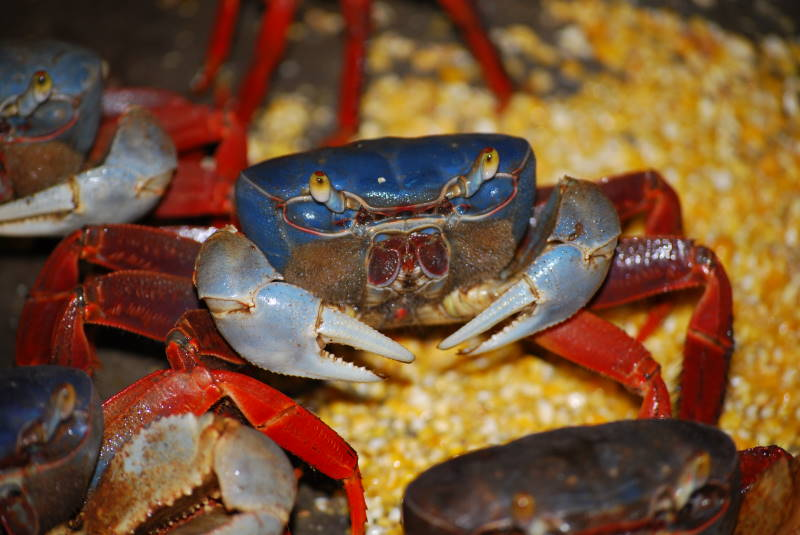

Scientific classification
- Domain: Eukaryota
- Kingdom: Animalia
- Phylum: Arthropoda
- Class: Malacostraca
- Order: Decapoda
- Suborder: Pleocyemata
- Infraorder: Brachyura
- Family: Gecarcinidae
- Genus: Cardisoma
- Species: C. crassum

Binomial name
- Cardisoma crassum Smith, 1870

= Cardisoma crassum =

Mouthless crab

Species of crab

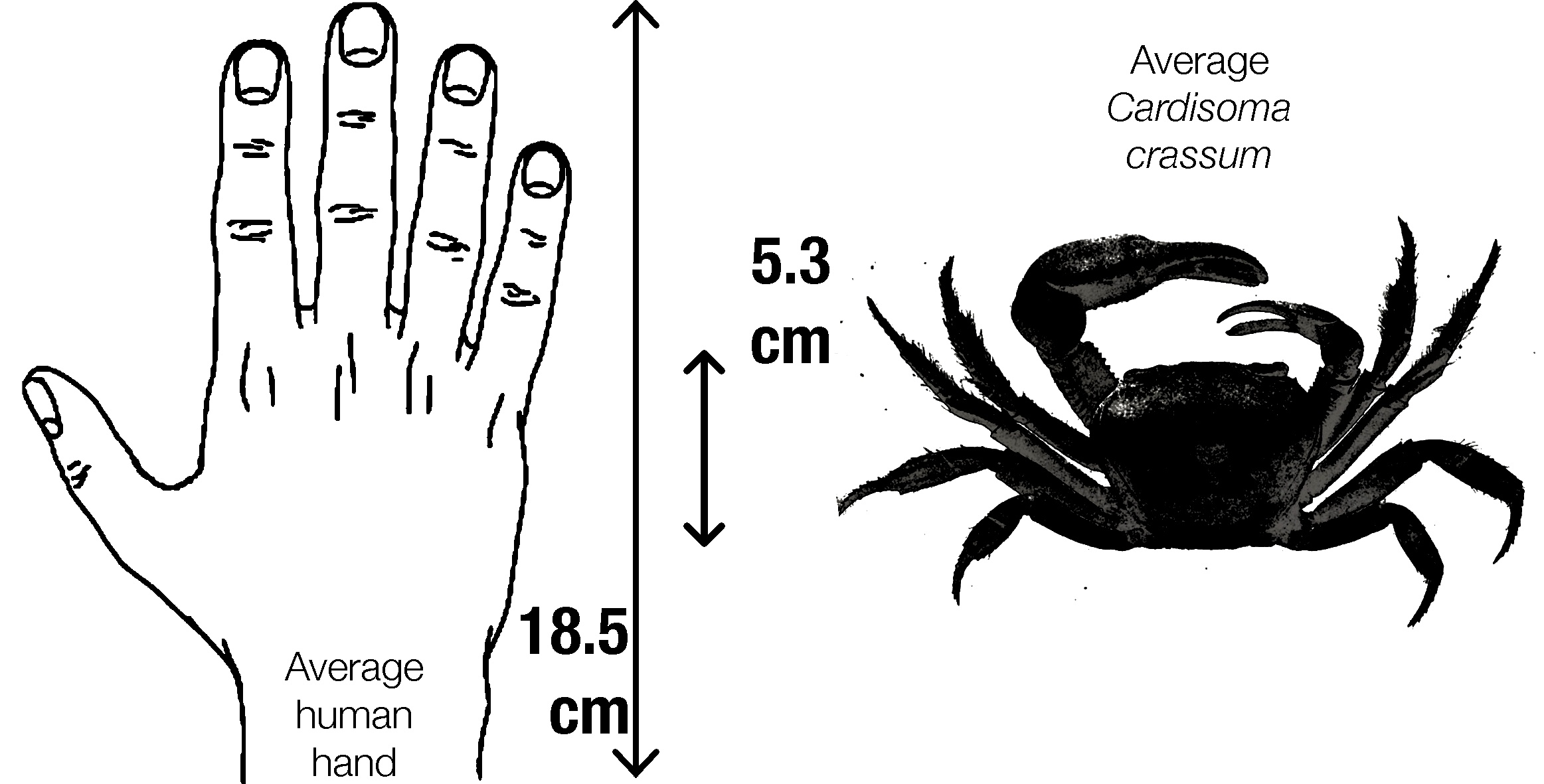
Rough size comparison between a mouthless crab and an average human hand.

Cardisoma crassum, known as the mouthless crab, is a species of terrestrial crab found in the coastal tropical eastern Pacific from Baja California to Peru.

== Classification ==
Cardisoma crassum is in the family Gecarcinidae, also known as the land crabs. Sidney Irving Smith described the species in 1870.

== Distribution and habitat ==
Mouthless crabs live in the eastern Pacific region, just one of three species of land crabs found there. They are distributed from Baja California and the neighbouring Gulf of California southwards to Peru and sometimes into Chile. Cardisoma crassum is common among mangrove roots, where it builds its burrow. Burrows dug by Cardisoma crassum are complex, often over 2 meters deep and located in high areas of mangroves with a water reservoir at the bottom of the burrow. A new species of sand fly in the genus Culicoides was found to be living and breeding in mouthless crabs' burrows, and was subbed C. cancer due to the crab connection.

== Description ==
Cardisoma crassum is a fairly small species with a carapace broader than it is long. Smith's original description measured three males and one female; the average male had a carapace measuring 53.7 mm × 65.4 mm (2.11 in × 2.57 in), measured in length × width. The female measured 53 mm × 64.5 mm (2.09 in × 2.54 in).

Mouthless crabs are colourful, with a dark blue carapace, red walking leg dactyli, and a large cheliped with a pale yellowy to dirty white top and cream-coloured underside.
