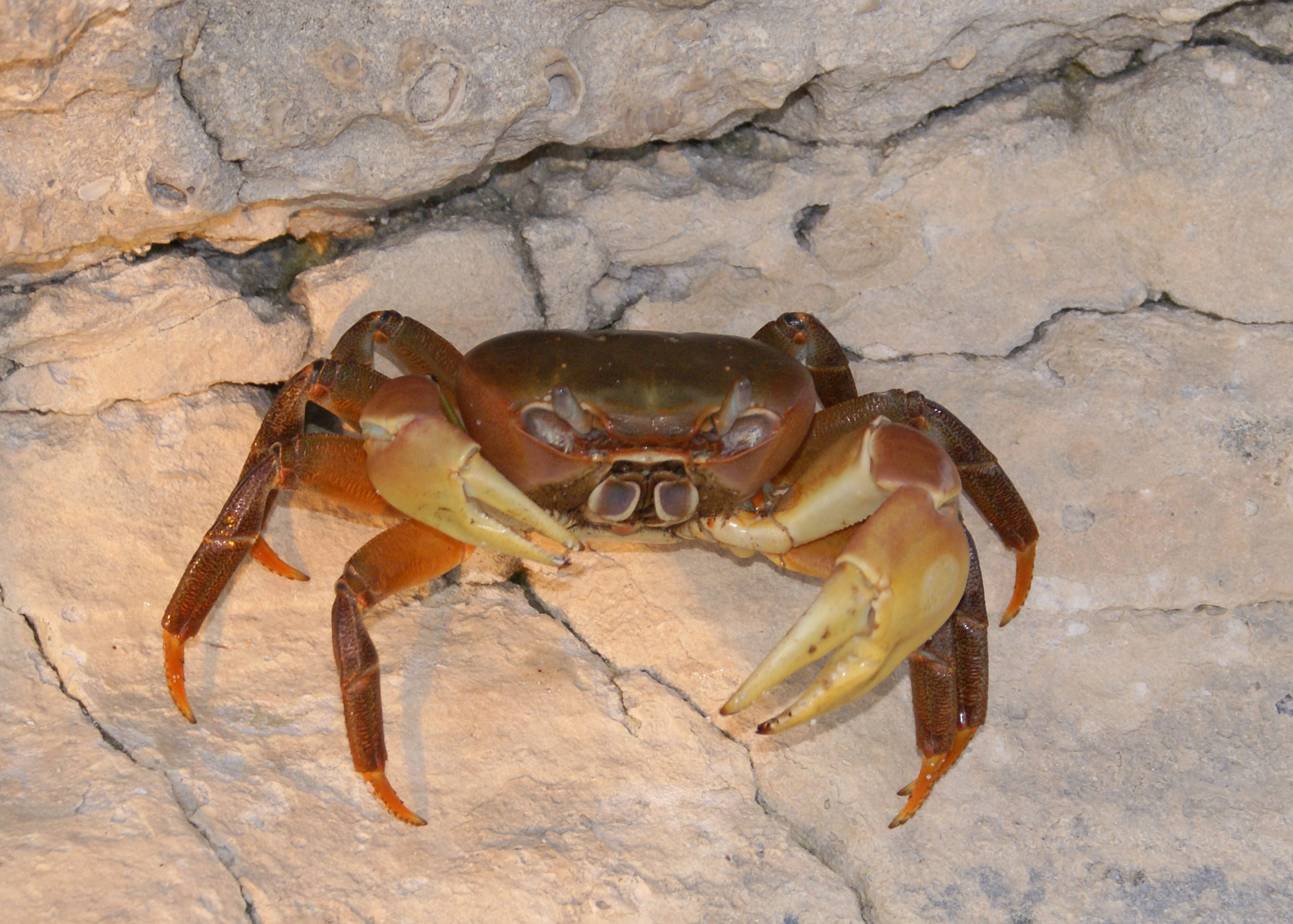
- Cardisoma carnifex

Scientific classification
- Kingdom: Animalia
- Phylum: Arthropoda
- Class: Malacostraca
- Order: Decapoda
- Suborder: Pleocyemata
- Infraorder: Brachyura
- Family: Gecarcinidae
- Genus: Cardisoma; Latreille, 1828

Type species
- Cardisoma guanhumi Latreille, 1828

= Cardisoma =

Genus of crustaceans

Cardisoma is a genus of large land crabs. Three species formerly placed in this genus are now placed in Discoplax. The four species that remain in Cardisoma are found in warm coastal regions where they live in burrows. Young individuals are often very colourful with a purple-blue carapace and orange-red legs (leading to a level of popularity in the pet trade), but as they grow older the colours tend to fade, and females may be duller than males. Although less extreme than in fiddler crabs, one claw is usually considerably larger than the other. They are omnivores, but primarily feed on plant material.

== Species ==
The genus Cardisoma comprises these four species:

Image	Name	Common name	Distribution
	Cardisoma armatum Herklots, 1851	(African) rainbow crab, (Nigerian) moon crab or patriot crab	east Atlantic coastal regions
	Cardisoma carnifex (Herbst, 1794)	red-claw crab	Indo-Pacific coastal regions
	Cardisoma crassum Smith, 1870	mouthless crab	east Pacific coastal regions
	Cardisoma guanhumi Latreille, 1825	blue land crab or giant land crab	west Atlantic coastal regions
	† Cardisoma planum Rathbun, 1945		

== See also ==
- Tuerkayana – a genus which holds crabs formerly found in Discoplax and Cardisoma
