= X. roseum =

X. roseum may refer to:

- Xanthosoma roseum, an ornamental plant in the genus Xanthosoma
- Xenophyllum roseum, a species of flowering plant found only in Ecuador

== Synonyms ==
- Xiphosium roseum, a synonym for Eria rosea, a species of orchid
