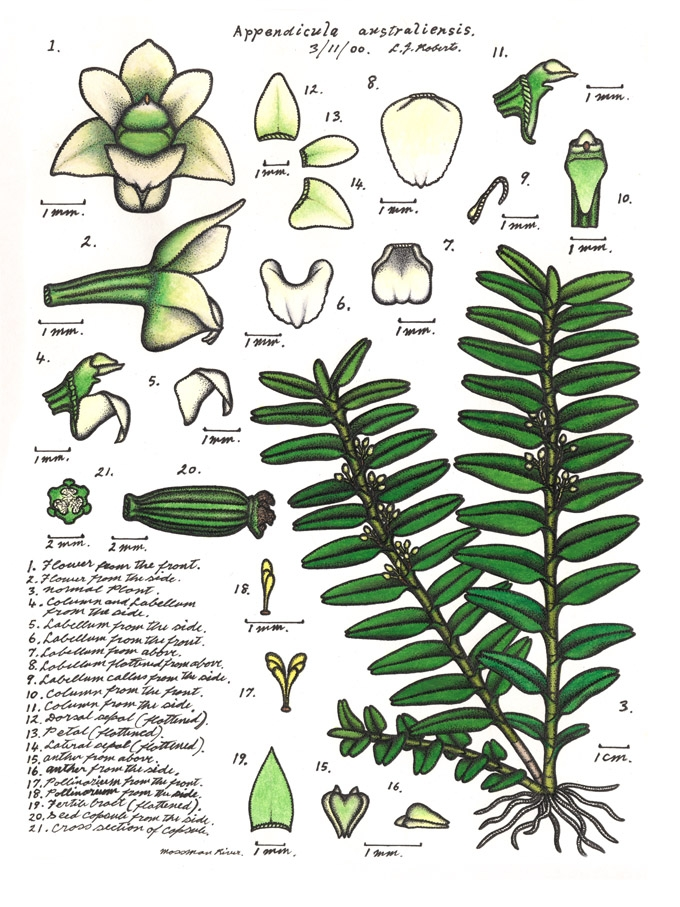
- Podochilus australiensis

Scientific classification
- Kingdom: Plantae
- Clade: Tracheophytes
- Clade: Angiosperms
- Clade: Monocots
- Order: Asparagales
- Family: Orchidaceae
- Subfamily: Epidendroideae
- Tribe: Podochileae; Pfitzer (1887) Entw. Nat. Anordn. Orch., 101 (1887)

Subtribes
- Eriinae; Thelasiinae

= Podochileae =

Tribe of orchids

Podochileae is an orchid tribe in the subfamily Epidendroideae.

== Genera ==
Genera:

- Aeridostachya (Hook.f.) Brieger
- Appendicula Blume
- Ascidieria Seidenf.
- Bambuseria Schuit., Y.P.Ng & H.A.Pedersen
- Bryobium Lindl.
- Callostylis Blume
- Campanulorchis Brieger
- Ceratostylis Blume
- Cryptochilus Wall.
- Cylindrolobus Blume
- Dendrolirium Blume
- Dilochiopsis (Hook.f.) Brieger
- Epiblastus Schltr.
- Eria Lindl.
- Mediocalcar J.J.Sm.
- Mycaranthes Blume
- Octarrhena Thwaites
- Oxystophyllum Blume
- Phreatia Lindl.
- Pinalia Buch.-Ham. ex Lindl.
- Poaephyllum Ridl.
- Podochilus Blume
- Porpax Lindl.
- Pseuderia Schltr.
- Ridleyella Schltr.
- Strongyleria (Pfitzer) Schuit., Y.P.Ng & H.A.Pedersen
- Thelasis Blume
- Trichotosia Blume

== See also ==
- Taxonomy of the Orchidaceae
