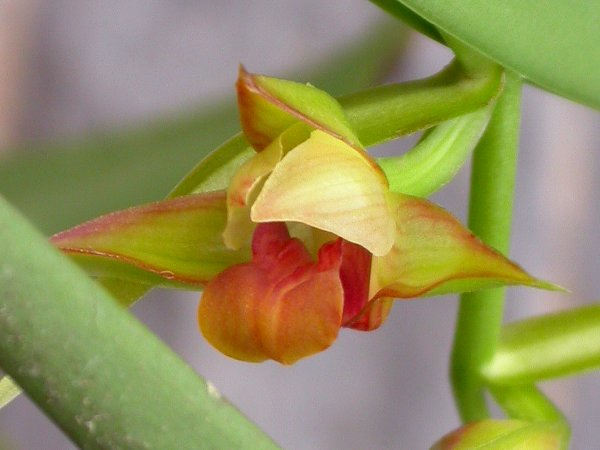
- Cryptochilus carinatus

Scientific classification
- Kingdom: Plantae
- Clade: Tracheophytes
- Clade: Angiosperms
- Clade: Monocots
- Order: Asparagales
- Family: Orchidaceae
- Subfamily: Epidendroideae
- Tribe: Podochileae
- Subtribe: Eriinae; Benth.

Genera
- See text

= Eriinae =

Subtribe of orchids

The Eriinae form a subtribe of Podochileae, a tribe of the orchid family (Orchidaceae). The name is derived from the genus Eria.

The subtribe includes 24 genera with more than 900 species of epiphytic, lithophytic or (more rarely) terrestrial orchids from tropical regions of India, China, Southeast Asia, and Africa.

Genera:

- Aeridostachya (Hook.f.) Brieger
- Appendicula Blume
- Ascidieria Seidenf.
- Bambuseria Schuit., Y.P.Ng & H.A.Pedersen
- Bryobium Lindl.
- Callostylis Blume
- Campanulorchis Brieger
- Ceratostylis Blume
- Cryptochilus Wall.
- Cylindrolobus Blume
- Dendrolirium Blume
- Dilochiopsis (Hook.f.) Brieger
- Epiblastus Schltr.
- Eria Lindl.
- Mediocalcar J.J.Sm.
- Mycaranthes Blume
- Oxystophyllum Blume
- Pinalia Buch.-Ham. ex Lindl.
- Poaephyllum Ridl.
- Podochilus Blume
- Porpax Lindl.
- Pseuderia Schltr.
- Strongyleria (Pfitzer) Schuit., Y.P.Ng & H.A.Pedersen
- Trichotosia Blume
