= Poaephyllum =

Scientific classification
- Kingdom: Plantae
- Clade: Tracheophytes
- Clade: Angiosperms
- Clade: Monocots
- Order: Asparagales
- Family: Orchidaceae
- Subfamily: Epidendroideae
- Tribe: Podochileae
- Subtribe: Eriinae
- Genus: Poaephyllum; Ridl.

Synonyms
- Lectandra J.J.Sm.

Genus of orchids

Poaephyllum is a genus of flowering plants from the orchid family, Orchidaceae native to Southeast Asia and New Guinea.

1. Poaephyllum fimbriatum Schuit. & de Vogel - Papua New Guinea
2. Poaephyllum grandiflorum Quisumb. - Palawan
3. Poaephyllum pauciflorum (Hook.f.) Ridl. - Thailand, Malaysia, Borneo, Sumatra, Java, Philippines
4. Poaephyllum podochiloides (Schltr.) Ridl. - Borneo, New Guinea
5. Poaephyllum selebicum J.J.Sm. - Sulawesi
6. Poaephyllum tenuipes (Schltr.) Rolfe - New Guinea
7. Poaephyllum trilobum J.J.Sm. - New Guinea

== See also ==
- List of Orchidaceae genera
