= Hexameria =

Hexameria may refer to:

- Hexameria R.Br., a synonym of the plant genus Podochilus
- Hexameria Torr. & A.Gray, a synonym of the plant genus Echinocystis
