= Appendicula calcarata =

Conservation status
- Least Concern (IUCN 3.1)

Scientific classification
- Kingdom: Plantae
- Clade: Tracheophytes
- Clade: Angiosperms
- Clade: Monocots
- Order: Asparagales
- Family: Orchidaceae
- Subfamily: Epidendroideae
- Genus: Appendicula
- Species: A. calcarata

Binomial name
- Appendicula calcarata Ridl.

Synonyms
- Podochilus calcaratus (Ridl.) Schltr.

Species of orchid

Appendicula calcarata is a species of orchid that can be found on the islands of Sumatra and Borneo in Indonesia and Malaysia, from elevations of 700–1,300 m. It can be found in lower riverine montane forests, and it flowers from July–September. It is threatened by loss of forest cover, mining activities, logging, agriculture and development.
