= E. rosea =

E. rosea may refer to:

- Ecdysanthera rosea, a plant species now known as Urceola rosea
- Eria rosea, an orchid species
- Euglandina rosea, the rosy wolfsnail or the cannibal snail, a large predatory air-breathing land snail species

== See also ==
- Rosea (disambiguation)
