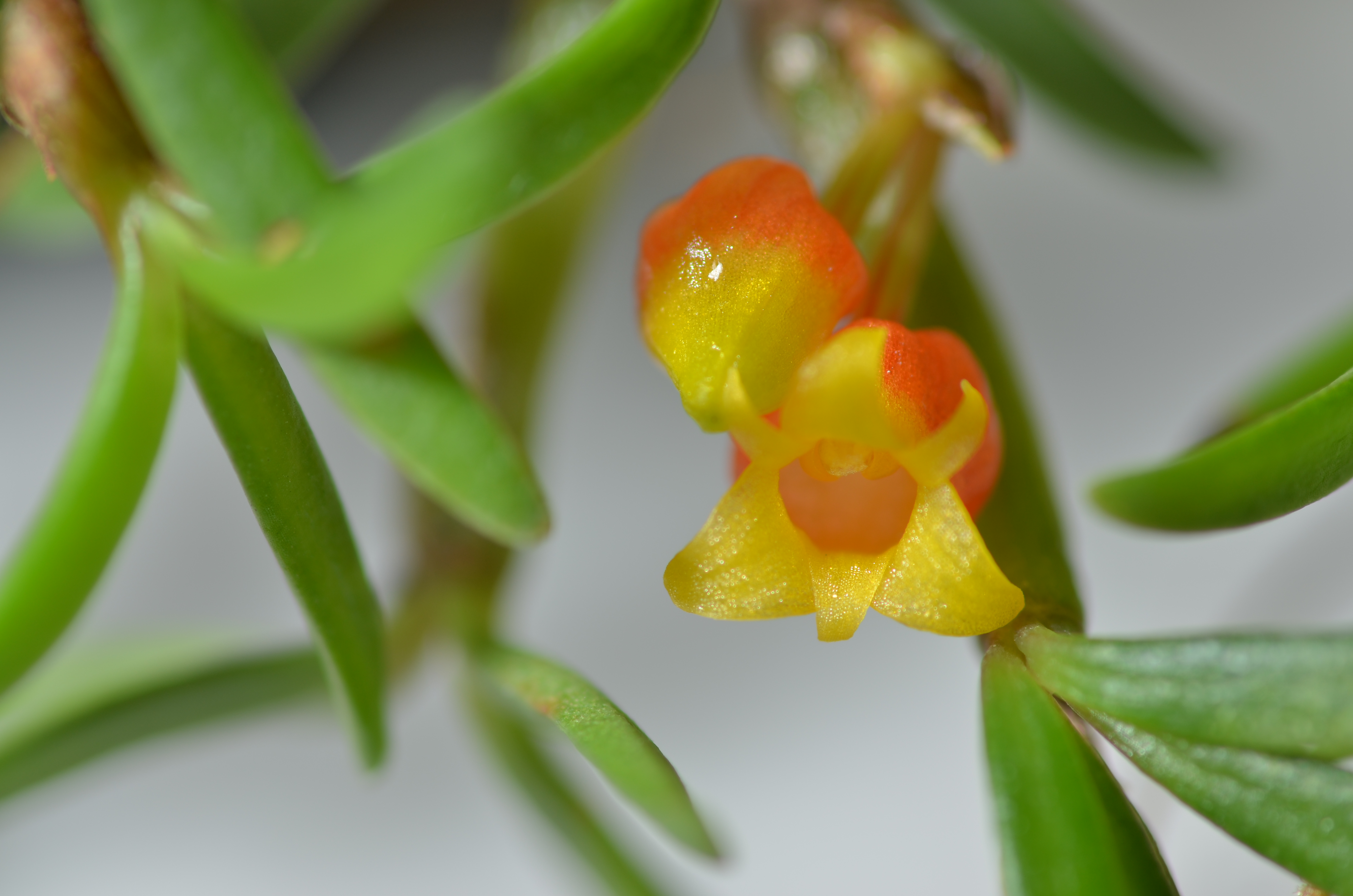
- Mediocalcar pygmaeum in cultivation

Scientific classification
- Kingdom: Plantae
- Clade: Tracheophytes
- Clade: Angiosperms
- Clade: Monocots
- Order: Asparagales
- Family: Orchidaceae
- Subfamily: Epidendroideae
- Genus: Mediocalcar
- Species: M. pygmaeum

Binomial name
- Mediocalcar pygmaeum Schltr.

= Mediocalcar pygmaeum =

Species of orchid

Mediocalcar pygmaeum is an epiphytic species of orchids in the genus Mediocalcar that is endemic to New Guinea. It has red, orange or orange-yellow coloured flowers with yellow, yellowish green or green tips. The pseudobulbs are a yellowish green colour with olive-green leaves.

== Distribution and habitat ==
Found in cool montane forest at elevations of 1,200 to 2,850 m (3,940 to 9,350 ft).
