= Strongyleria =

Scientific classification
- Kingdom: Plantae
- Clade: Tracheophytes
- Clade: Angiosperms
- Clade: Monocots
- Order: Asparagales
- Family: Orchidaceae
- Subfamily: Epidendroideae
- Tribe: Podochileae
- Subtribe: Eriinae
- Genus: Strongyleria (Pfitzer) Schuit., Y.P.Ng & H.A.Pedersen

Genus of plants

Strongyleria is a genus of flowering plants belonging to the family Orchidaceae.

Its native range is Assam to South China and New Guinea.

Species:

- Strongyleria hirsutipetala (Ames) Schuit., Y.P.Ng & H.A.Pedersen
- Strongyleria leiophylla (Lindl.) Schuit., Y.P.Ng & H.A.Pedersen
- Strongyleria pannea (Lindl.) Schuit., Y.P.Ng & H.A.Pedersen
- Strongyleria pellipes (Rchb.f. ex Hook.f.) Schuit., Y.P.Ng & H.A.Pedersen
