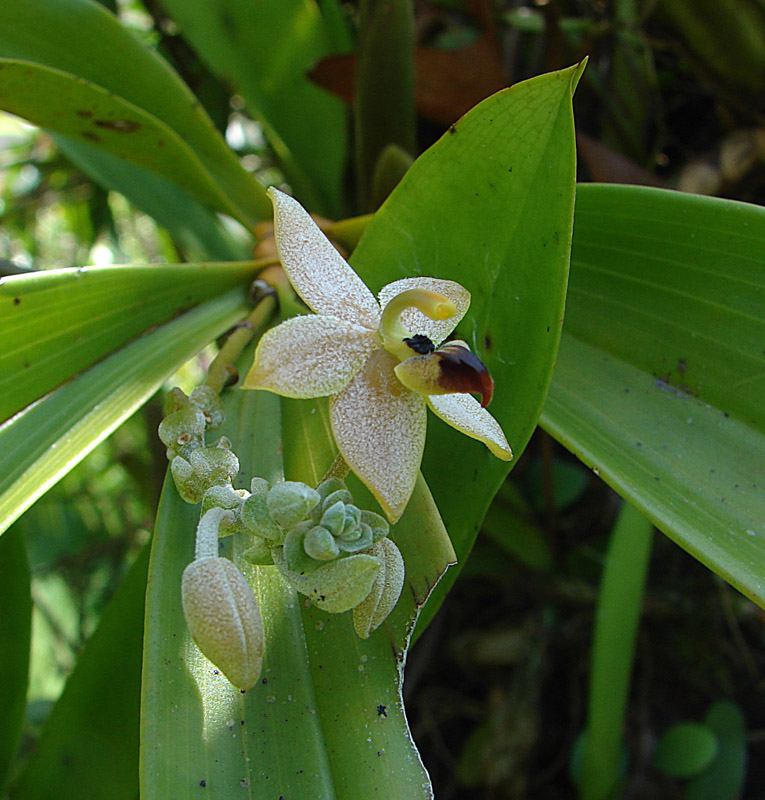
- Callostylis pulchella in Borneo

Scientific classification
- Kingdom: Plantae
- Clade: Embryophytes
- Clade: Tracheophytes
- Clade: Spermatophytes
- Clade: Angiosperms
- Clade: Monocots
- Order: Asparagales
- Family: Orchidaceae
- Subfamily: Epidendroideae
- Tribe: Podochileae
- Subtribe: Eriinae
- Genus: Callostylis; Blume

Type species
- Callostylis rigida Blume

Synonyms
- Tylostylis Blume

= Callostylis =

Genus of orchids

Callostylis is a genus of orchids. It was previously considered as a synonym of the genus Eria, but eventually it has become an accepted name. It is native to Southeast Asia from Assam and southern China to Java.

Five species are currently recognised (May 2014):

- Callostylis bambusifolia (Lindl.) S.C.Chen & J.J.Wood - Yunnan, Guangxi, Assam, Bhutan, India, Myanmar, Thailand, Vietnam
- Callostylis carnosissima (Ames & C.Schweinf.) J.J.Wood - Sabah
- Callostylis cyrtosepala (Schltr.) Y.P.Ng & P.J.Cribb - Sumatra
- Callostylis pulchella (Lindl.) S.C.Chen & Z.H.Tsi - Laos, Thailand, Malaysia, Borneo, Sulawesi, Java, Sumatra
- Callostylis rigida Blume - from Assam and southern China to Java.
