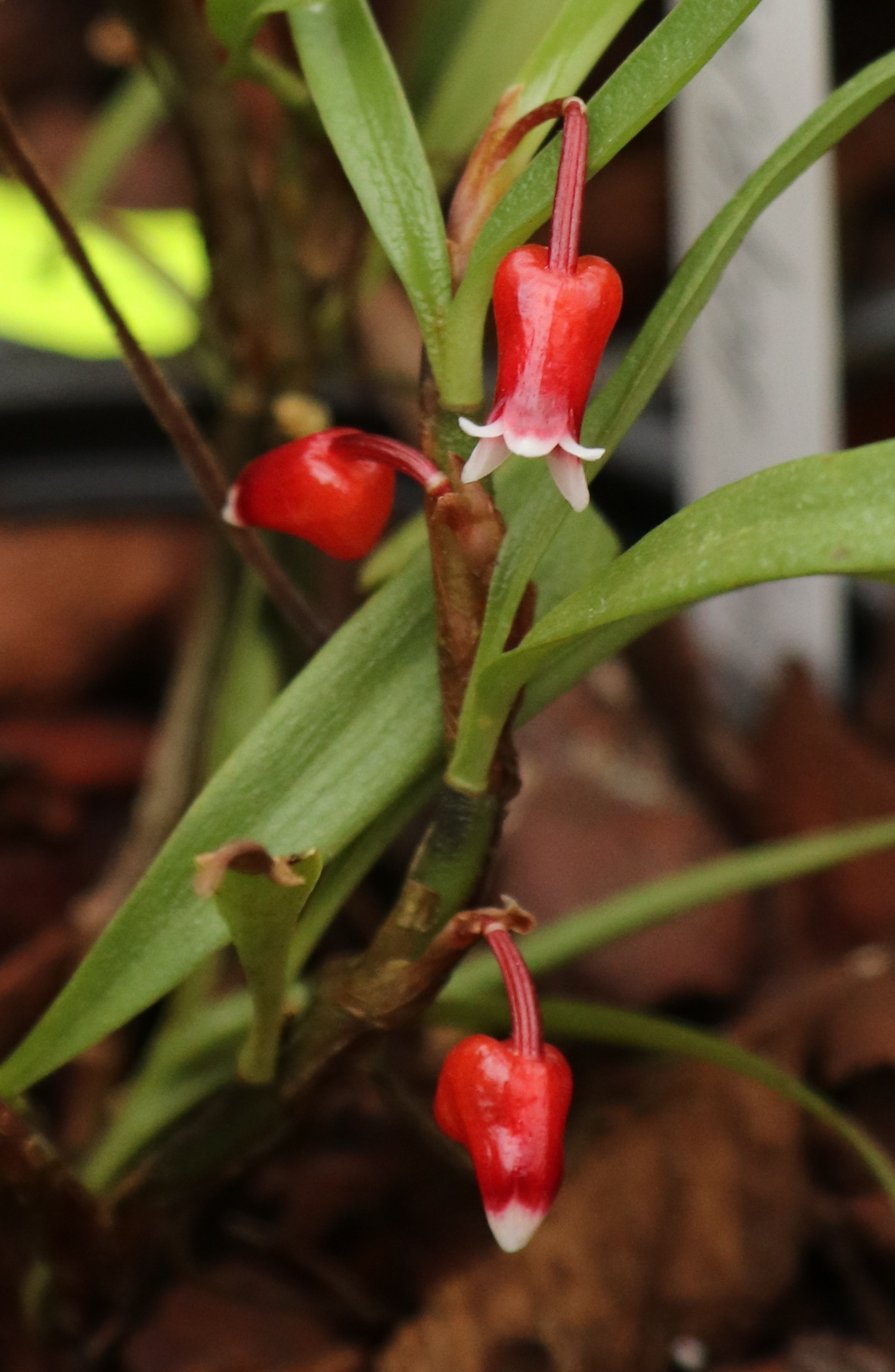
- Mediocalcar paradoxum subsp. robustum

Scientific classification
- Kingdom: Plantae
- Clade: Tracheophytes
- Clade: Angiosperms
- Clade: Monocots
- Order: Asparagales
- Family: Orchidaceae
- Subfamily: Epidendroideae
- Genus: Mediocalcar
- Species: M. paradoxum

Binomial name
- Mediocalcar paradoxum (Kraenzl.) Schltr. 1910

Synonyms
- Bulbophyllum urceolatum A.D.Hawkes 1952; Cryptochilus bicolor (J.J.Sm.) J.J.Sm. 1903; Eria tunensis Kraenzl. 1911; Mediocalcar bicolor J.J.Sm. 1900; Mediocalcar kaniense Schltr. 1911; Mediocalcar ponapense Schltr. 1921; Mediocalcar selebicum J.J.Sm. 1933; Mediocalcar stenopetalum Schltr. 1911; Mediocalcar ternatense J.J.Sm. 1927

= Mediocalcar paradoxum =

Species of plant

Mediocalcar paradoxum is a species of Mediocalcar found in Moluccas, Sulawesi, New Guinea, the Solomon Islands, the Santa Cruz Islands, Fiji, Samoa, the Caroline Islands and Vanuatu
