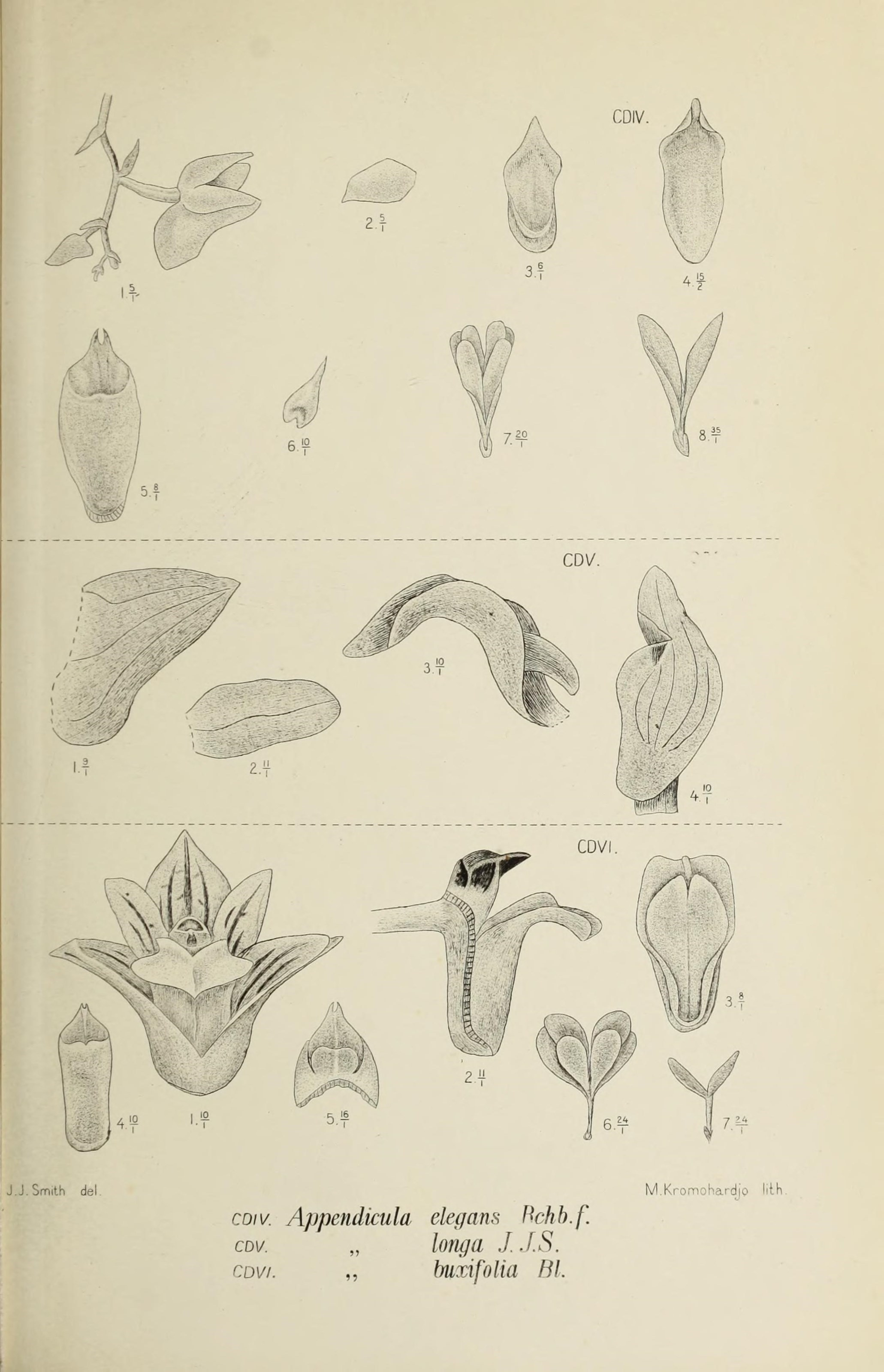
- Illustration in Die Orchideen von Java (fig. 404-406) by J.J. Smith (1912).

Scientific classification
- Kingdom: Plantae
- Clade: Tracheophytes
- Clade: Angiosperms
- Clade: Monocots
- Order: Asparagales
- Family: Orchidaceae
- Subfamily: Epidendroideae
- Genus: Appendicula
- Species: A. elegans

Binomial name
- Appendicula elegans Rchb.f., 1857

Synonyms
- Podochilus elegans (Rchb.f.) Schltr., 1900; Podochilus zollingeri Rchb.f., 1857

= Appendicula elegans =

Species of orchid

Appendicula elegans is a species of orchids. It is found in Malesia (Java, Lesser Sunda Islands, Sumatra).
