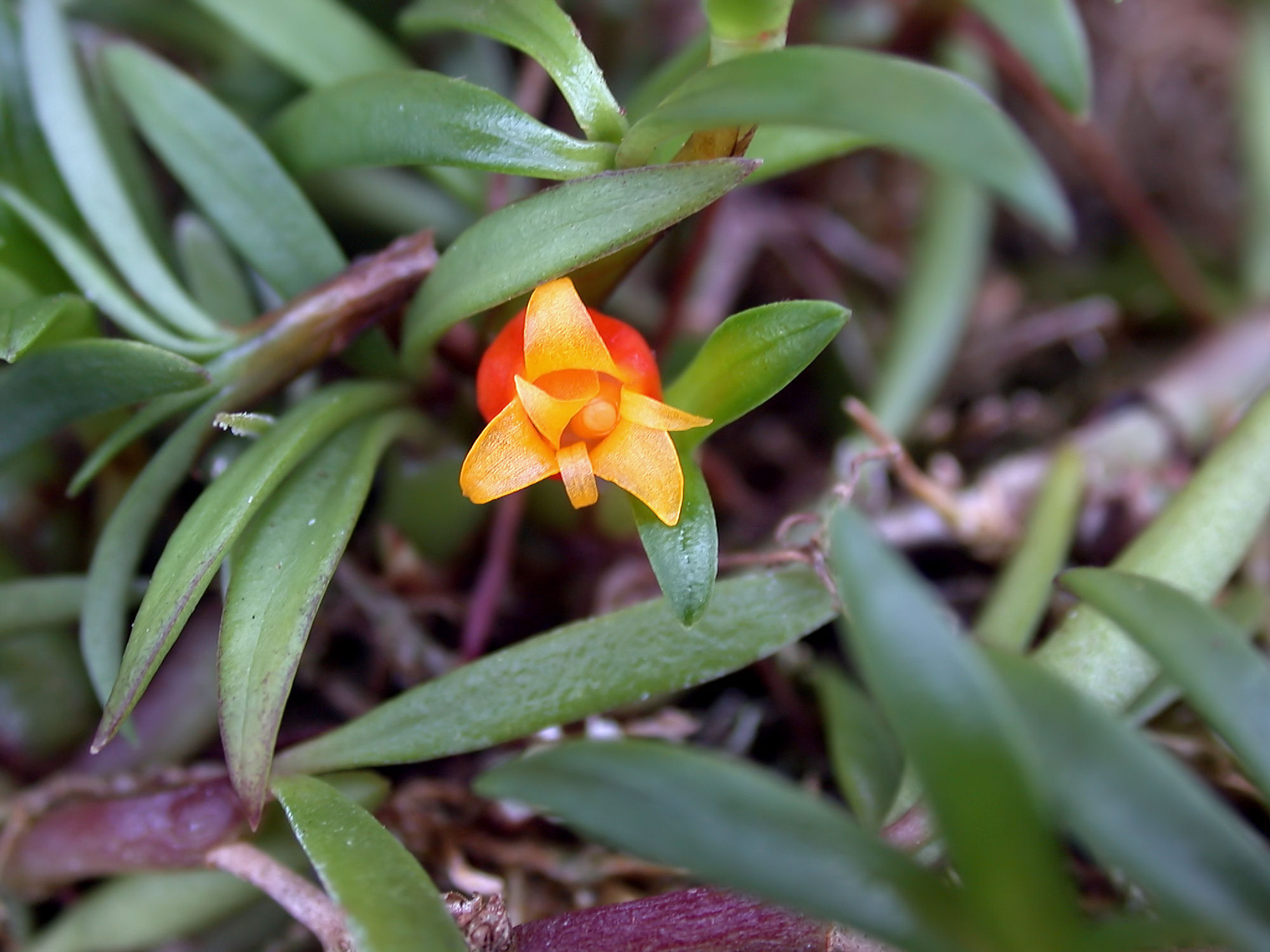
- Mediocalcar decoratum

Scientific classification
- Kingdom: Plantae
- Clade: Tracheophytes
- Clade: Angiosperms
- Clade: Monocots
- Order: Asparagales
- Family: Orchidaceae
- Subfamily: Epidendroideae
- Tribe: Podochileae
- Subtribe: Eriinae
- Genus: Mediocalcar; J.J.Sm.

= Mediocalcar =

Genus of orchids

Mediocalcar is a genus of flowering plants from the orchid family, Orchidaceae. It is native to New Guinea, eastern Indonesia, and the islands of the western Pacific. The orchid abbreviation is Med.

- Mediocalcar agathodaemonis J.J.Sm.
- Mediocalcar arfakense J.J.Sm.
- Mediocalcar bifolium J.J.Sm.
- Mediocalcar brachygenium Schltr.
- Mediocalcar bulbophylloides J.J.Sm.
- Mediocalcar congestum Schuit.
- Mediocalcar crenulatum J.J.Sm.
- Mediocalcar decoratum Schuit.
- Mediocalcar geniculatum J.J.Sm.
- Mediocalcar papuanum R.S.Rogers
- Mediocalcar paradoxum (Kraenzl.) Schltr.
- Mediocalcar pygmaeum Schltr.
- Mediocalcar stevenscoodei P.Royen
- Mediocalcar subteres Schuit.
- Mediocalcar umboiense Schuit.
- Mediocalcar uniflorum Schltr.
- Mediocalcar versteegii J.J.Sm.

== See also ==
- List of Orchidaceae genera
