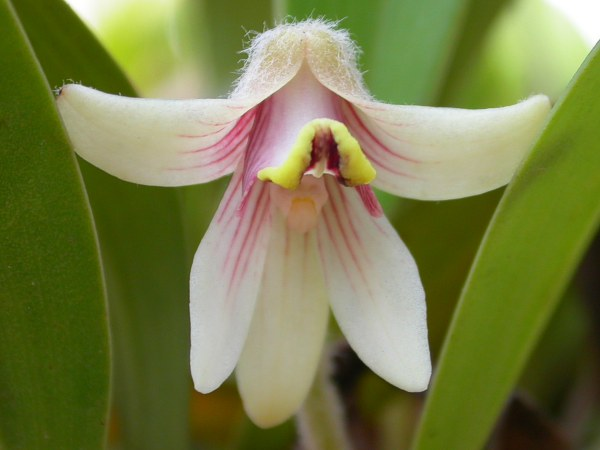

Scientific classification
- Kingdom: Plantae
- Clade: Tracheophytes
- Clade: Angiosperms
- Clade: Monocots
- Order: Asparagales
- Family: Orchidaceae
- Subfamily: Epidendroideae
- Genus: Campanulorchis
- Species: C. globifera

Binomial name
- Campanulorchis globifera (Rolfe) Brieger

Synonyms
- Pinalia globifera (Rolfe) A.N.Rao; Eria globifera Rolfe; Eria langbianensis Gagnep.

= Campanulorchis globifera =

Species of orchid

Campanulorchis globifera is a species of orchid endemic to Vietnam.
