= Bambuseria =

Scientific classification
- Kingdom: Plantae
- Clade: Tracheophytes
- Clade: Angiosperms
- Clade: Monocots
- Order: Asparagales
- Family: Orchidaceae
- Subfamily: Epidendroideae
- Tribe: Podochileae
- Subtribe: Eriinae
- Genus: Bambuseria; Schuit., Y.P.Ng & H.A.Pedersen

Genus of flowering plants

Bambuseria is a genus of flowering plants belonging to the family Orchidaceae.

Its native range is Indian subcontinent to Southern China.

Species:

- Bambuseria bambusifolia (Lindl.) Schuit., Y.P.Ng & H.A.Pedersen
- Bambuseria crassicaulis (Hook.f.) Schuit., Y.P.Ng & H.A.Pedersen
