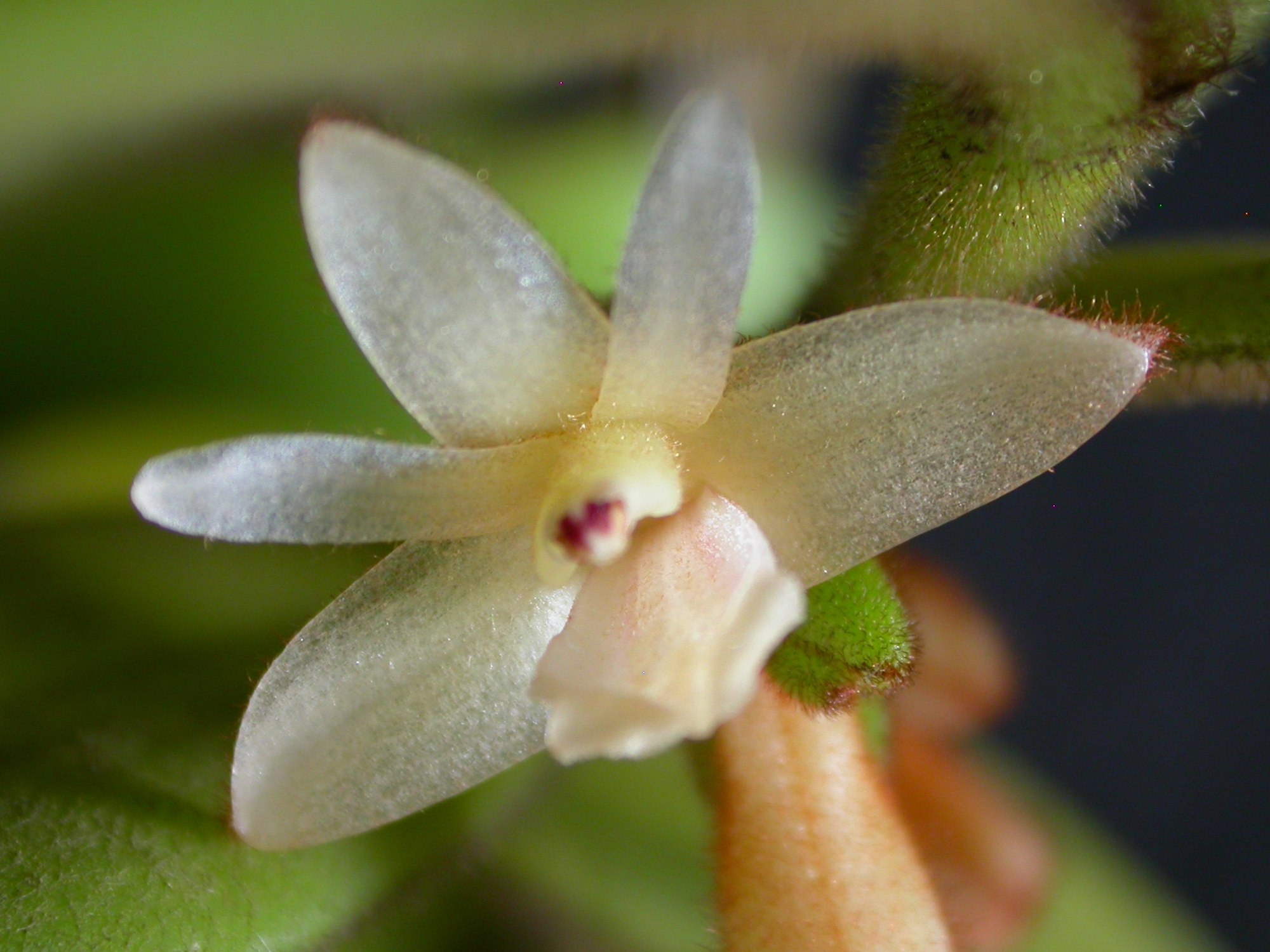
- Trichotosia velutina

Scientific classification
- Kingdom: Plantae
- Clade: Tracheophytes
- Clade: Angiosperms
- Clade: Monocots
- Order: Asparagales
- Family: Orchidaceae
- Subfamily: Epidendroideae
- Tribe: Podochileae
- Subtribe: Eriinae
- Genus: Trichotosia; Blume

Selected species
- Trichotosia annulata; Trichotosia biflora; Trichotosia brachiata; Trichotosia calvescens; Trichotosia conifera; Trichotosia dalatensis; Trichotosia elongata; Trichotosia flexuosa; Trichotosia gjellerupii; Trichotosia hallieri; Trichotosia integra; Trichotosia katherinae; Trichotosia lacinulata; Trichotosia leptocarpa; Trichotosia microphylla; Trichotosia molliflora; Trichotosia odorifera; Trichotosia pendula; Trichotosia pilifera; Trichotosia quadricolor; Trichotosia rhodoleuca; Trichotosia spathulata; Trichotosia thomsenii; Trichotosia tuberosa; Trichotosia uniflora; Trichotosia velutina; Trichotosia vulpina; Trichotosia wallaoeana

= Trichotosia =

Genus of orchids

Trichotosia is a genus of orchids with about 50 species distributed in China, the Himalayas, Southeast Asia (Indonesia, Indochina, Philippines etc.), New Guinea and various islands of the western Pacific (Solomon Islands, Vanuatu, etc.).
