= Epiblastus sciadanthus =

Scientific classification
- Kingdom: Plantae
- Clade: Tracheophytes
- Clade: Angiosperms
- Clade: Monocots
- Order: Asparagales
- Family: Orchidaceae
- Subfamily: Epidendroideae
- Genus: Epiblastus
- Species: E. sciadanthus

Binomial name
- Epiblastus sciadanthus (F.Muell.) Schltr.

Synonyms
- Bulbophyllum sciadanthum F.Muell.; Eria sciadantha (F.Muell.) Kraenzl.; Eria ornithidioides Kraenzl.

Species of orchid

Epiblastus sciadanthus is a species of epiphytic orchid in the genus Epiblastus and is found in the Solomon Islands, Fiji, Samoa and Vanuatu.
