= Cylindrolobus gloensis =

Conservation status
- Critically Endangered (IUCN 3.1)

Scientific classification
- Kingdom: Plantae
- Clade: Tracheophytes
- Clade: Angiosperms
- Clade: Monocots
- Order: Asparagales
- Family: Orchidaceae
- Subfamily: Epidendroideae
- Genus: Cylindrolobus
- Species: C. gloensis

Binomial name
- Cylindrolobus gloensis (Ormerod & Agrawala) Schuit., Y.P.Ng & H.A.Pedersen

Species of orchid

Cylindrolobus gloensis is a critically endangered species of orchid found only in Arunachal Pradesh in India.

== Description ==
This species is an epiphyte found growing on barks and branches of trees. The stem is 24 cm long with 4 leaves and 0.25 cm thick at the base. The leaves are lingulate-lanceolate and 10-12 cm long. The flowers are cream colored with soft short erect hairs.

This orchid can be differentiated from the similar looking Cylindrolobus arunachalensis by the single bicarinate callus on the labellum instead of two and two groups of hairs on epichile.

== Distribution ==
This species of orchid was known only from a community forest in Kamlang Valley in Mishmi Hills of Arunachal Pradesh. The estimated known are of occupancy is 4 km^{2}. As of 2021, there were no records beside the type locality of this species.

== Ecology ==
This orchid was found growing on trees inside a forest at 1220 meters elevation. The flowering season is March.

== Etymology ==
This species is named of the locality Glo in Kamlang valley from where it was collected.

== Taxonomy ==
D. K. Agrawala who described this species found an unidentified orchid specimen from India in Oakes Ames Orchid Herbarium in Harvard University. It was originally collected by British botanist Frank Kingdon-Ward in 1949 from Mishmi hills. He along with Paul Ormerod described this new species as Eria gloensis. Further studies in 2017 resulted in moving this species to the genus Cylindrolobus.

== Conservation and threats ==
This species is protected under CITES, hence collecting and trading of this species is banned in India. There is no information on population trend of this species. The community forest where the species was discovered is threatened by shifting agriculture practices.
