= Podochilus warnagalensis =

Scientific classification
- Kingdom: Plantae
- Clade: Tracheophytes
- Clade: Angiosperms
- Clade: Monocots
- Order: Asparagales
- Family: Orchidaceae
- Subfamily: Epidendroideae
- Genus: Podochilus
- Species: P. warnagalensis

Binomial name
- Podochilus warnagalensis Wijewardana, Priyadarshana, Arangala, Atthanagoda, Samarakoon & Kumar, 2016

Species of orchid

Podochilus warnagalensis is a species of epiphytic or lithophytic orchid endemic to Sri Lanka.

== Description ==
The plant is similar to P. malabaricus. Leaves shorter and larger. Flower completely opened and whitish pink in color. peduncle purplish. labellum with blunt apex, spur long and narrow. It can grow on lichen and moss which is covered granite rocks and boulders in streams.
