= Bambuseria bambusifolia =

Scientific classification
- Kingdom: Plantae
- Clade: Embryophytes
- Clade: Tracheophytes
- Clade: Spermatophytes
- Clade: Angiosperms
- Clade: Monocots
- Order: Asparagales
- Family: Orchidaceae
- Subfamily: Epidendroideae
- Genus: Bambuseria
- Species: B. bambusifolia

Binomial name
- Bambuseria bambusifolia Lindl.

Synonyms
- Callostylis bambusifolia S.C.Chen & J.J.Wood; Cylindrolobus bambusifolius Brieger; Eria bambusifolia Lindl.; Pinalia bambusifolia Kuntze

Species of flowering plant

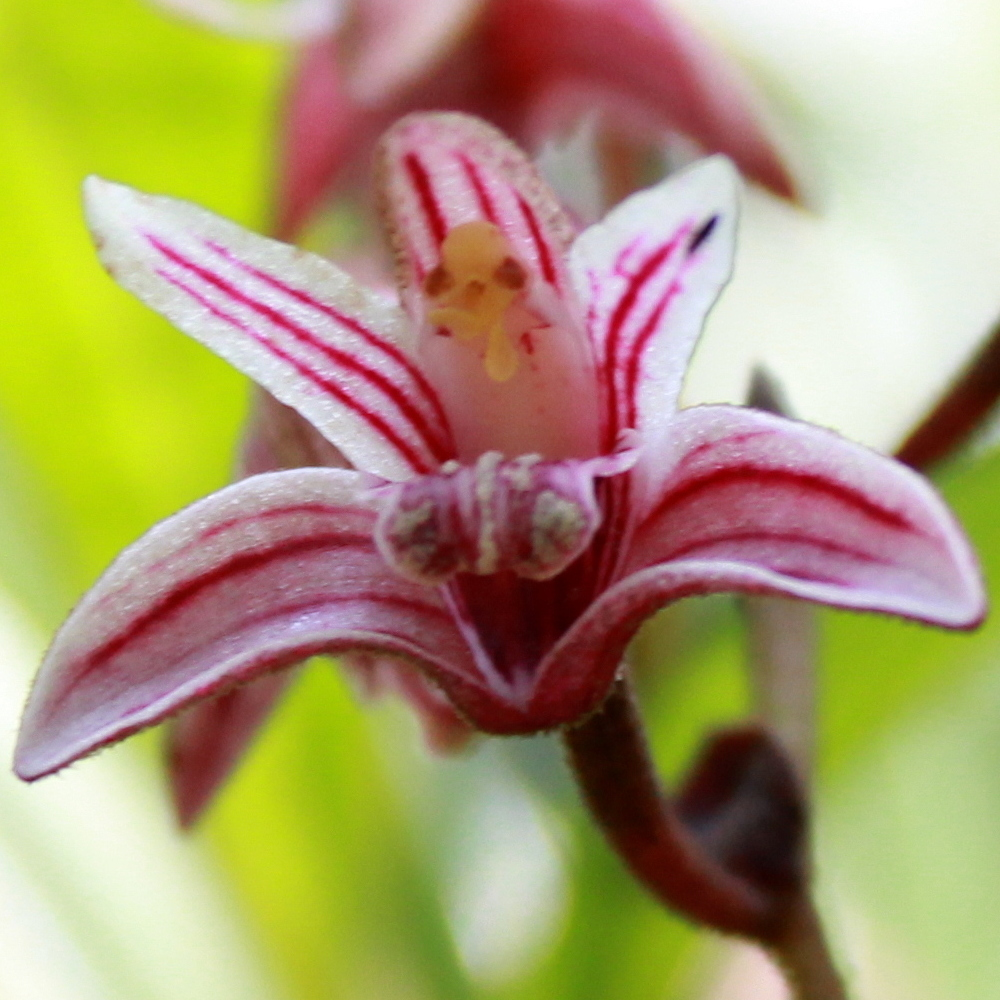
Bambuseria bambusifolia at Simlipal National Park, India

Bambuseria bambusifolia is a species of plant within the orchid family. It is native to Assam, China, India, Laos, Myanmar, Thailand, and Vietnam.
