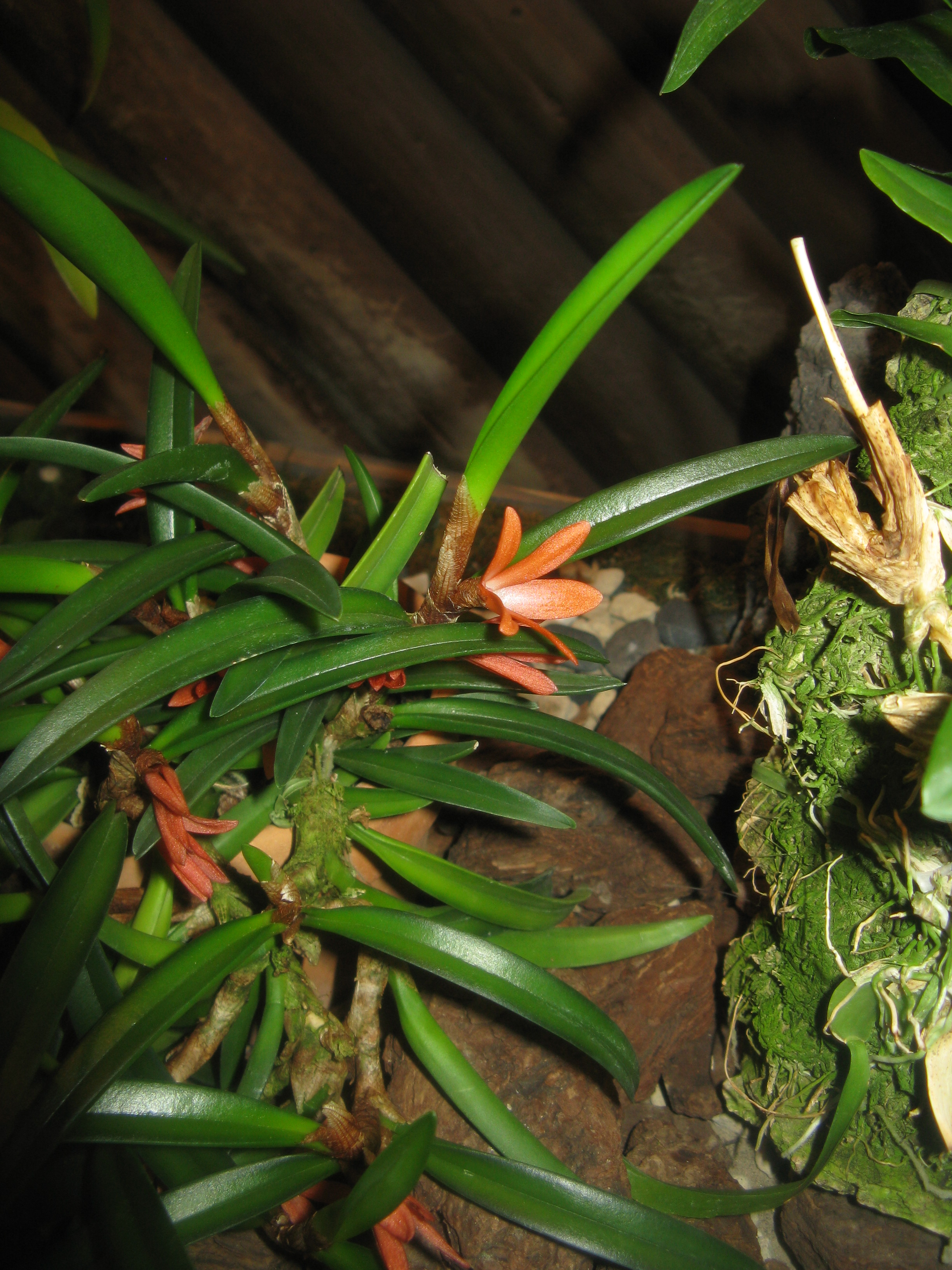
- Ceratostylis rubra

Scientific classification
- Kingdom: Plantae
- Clade: Tracheophytes
- Clade: Angiosperms
- Clade: Monocots
- Order: Asparagales
- Family: Orchidaceae
- Subfamily: Epidendroideae
- Tribe: Podochileae
- Subtribe: Eriinae
- Genus: Ceratostylis; Blume

Synonyms
- Macrotis Breda; Ritaia King & Pantl.; Sarcostoma Blume

= Ceratostylis =

Genus of orchids

Ceratostylis is a genus of orchids with more than 150 species distributed from Tibet and China, through Southeast Asia and Malesia to New Caledonia and Vanuatu.

== Species ==
As of December 2025, Plants of the World Online accepts the following 153 species:

- Ceratostylis acutifolia Schltr.
- Ceratostylis acutilabris J.J.Sm.
- Ceratostylis alata Carr
- Ceratostylis alberteduardi P.Royen
- Ceratostylis albiflora J.J.Sm.
- Ceratostylis alpina J.J.Sm.
- Ceratostylis alticola P.Royen
- Ceratostylis ampullacea Kraenzl.
- Ceratostylis anceps Blume
- Ceratostylis angiensis J.J.Sm.
- Ceratostylis angustifolia Ridl.
- Ceratostylis anjasmorensis J.J.Wood & J.B.Comber
- Ceratostylis arfakensis J.J.Sm.
- Ceratostylis armeria Ridl.
- Ceratostylis backeri J.J.Sm.
- Ceratostylis baliensis J.J.Sm.
- Ceratostylis borneensis J.J.Sm.
- Ceratostylis braccata Rchb.f.
- Ceratostylis brachyphylla Schltr.
- Ceratostylis brevibrachiata J.J.Sm.
- Ceratostylis breviceps Ridl.
- Ceratostylis breviclavata J.J.Sm.
- Ceratostylis brevicostata J.J.Sm.
- Ceratostylis brevipes Schltr.
- Ceratostylis bulbophylli Schltr.
- Ceratostylis caespitosa L.O.Williams
- Ceratostylis calcarata Schltr.
- Ceratostylis calceiformis R.S.Rogers
- Ceratostylis capitata Zoll. & Moritzi
- Ceratostylis cebolleta J.J.Sm.
- Ceratostylis celebica (Schltr.) Schuit., Y.P.Ng & H.A.Pedersen
- Ceratostylis ciliolata J.J.Sm.
- Ceratostylis clathrata Hook.f.
- Ceratostylis clavata J.J.Sm.
- Ceratostylis compressicaulis J.J.Sm.
- Ceratostylis crassifolia J.J.Sm.
- Ceratostylis crassilingua Ames & C.Schweinf.
- Ceratostylis crassipetala J.J.Sm.
- Ceratostylis culminicola P.Royen
- Ceratostylis curvimentum J.J.Sm.
- Ceratostylis dataensis Ames
- Ceratostylis dischorensis Schltr.
- Ceratostylis elmeri Ames
- Ceratostylis eria Govaerts
- Ceratostylis evrardii Gagnep.
- Ceratostylis ficinioides Schltr.
- Ceratostylis flavescens Schltr.
- Ceratostylis formicifera J.J.Sm.
- Ceratostylis glabra Ridl.
- Ceratostylis glabriflora Schltr.
- Ceratostylis gracilicaulis Schltr.
- Ceratostylis gracilis Blume
- Ceratostylis graminea Blume
- Ceratostylis grandiflora J.J.Sm.
- Ceratostylis hainanensis Z.H.Tsi
- Ceratostylis heleocharis Schltr.
- Ceratostylis heterophylla W.Suarez
- Ceratostylis himalaica Hook.f.
- Ceratostylis humilis J.J.Sm.
- Ceratostylis hydrophila Schltr.
- Ceratostylis incognita J.T.Atwood & Beckner
- Ceratostylis indifferens J.J.Sm.
- Ceratostylis inflata Schltr.
- Ceratostylis jacobsonii J.J.Sm.
- Ceratostylis javanica (Blume) Schuit., Y.P.Ng & H.A.Pedersen
- Ceratostylis juncoides Schltr.
- Ceratostylis kaniensis Schltr.
- Ceratostylis kerigomnensis P.Royen
- Ceratostylis keysseri Schltr.
- Ceratostylis koniguruensis Ormerod
- Ceratostylis lancifolia Hook.f.
- Ceratostylis lancipetala Schltr.
- Ceratostylis lateralis Schltr.
- Ceratostylis latifolia Blume
- Ceratostylis latuensis J.J.Sm.
- Ceratostylis leucantha Schltr.
- Ceratostylis loheri L.O.Williams
- Ceratostylis loloruensis Ormerod
- Ceratostylis lombasangensis J.J.Sm.
- Ceratostylis longicaulis J.J.Sm.
- Ceratostylis longifolia J.J.Sm.
- Ceratostylis longipedunculata J.J.Sm.
- Ceratostylis longipes Schltr.
- Ceratostylis longisegmenta Ames & C.Schweinf.
- Ceratostylis maboroensis Schltr.
- Ceratostylis macra J.J.Sm.
- Ceratostylis malintangensis J.J.Sm.
- Ceratostylis mamberamensis J.J.Sm.
- Ceratostylis mayrii J.J.Sm.
- Ceratostylis micrantha Schltr.
- Ceratostylis mindanaensis Ames
- Ceratostylis minutiflora Schltr.
- Ceratostylis muscicola J.J.Sm.
- Ceratostylis nalbesiensis J.J.Sm.
- Ceratostylis nivea Schltr.
- Ceratostylis obscure-violacea Gilli
- Ceratostylis octomerioides J.J.Wood & A.Lamb
- Ceratostylis oreophila Schltr.
- Ceratostylis ovatilabris J.J.Sm.
- Ceratostylis parciflora J.J.Sm.
- Ceratostylis parvifolia J.J.Sm.
- Ceratostylis pendula Hook.f.
- Ceratostylis phaeochlamys Schltr.
- Ceratostylis philippinensis Rolfe ex Ames
- Ceratostylis piepersii J.J.Sm.
- Ceratostylis pinguis Schltr.
- Ceratostylis platychila Schltr.
- Ceratostylis pleurothallis (C.S.P.Parish & Rchb.f.) Seidenf.
- Ceratostylis pristina M.Leon, Naive & Cootes
- Ceratostylis pugioniformis J.J.Sm.
- Ceratostylis pulchella Holttum
- Ceratostylis puncticulata Ridl.
- Ceratostylis radiata J.J.Sm.
- Ceratostylis ramosa Ames & Rolfe
- Ceratostylis recurva J.J.Sm.
- Ceratostylis resiana J.J.Sm.
- Ceratostylis retisquama Rchb.f.
- Ceratostylis rivularis Schltr.
- Ceratostylis robusta Hook.f.
- Ceratostylis sacculata J.J.Sm.
- Ceratostylis sarasinorum Schuit., Y.P.Ng & H.A.Pedersen
- Ceratostylis sarawakensis Schuit., Y.P.Ng & H.A.Pedersen
- Ceratostylis sarcostomatoides J.J.Sm.
- Ceratostylis sayeri Schltr.
- Ceratostylis scariosa Ridl.
- Ceratostylis scirpoides Schltr.
- Ceratostylis selebensis J.J.Sm.
- Ceratostylis senilis Rchb.f.
- Ceratostylis sessilis J.J.Sm.
- Ceratostylis siamensis Rolfe ex Downie
- Ceratostylis sima J.J.Sm.
- Ceratostylis simplex Blume
- Ceratostylis spathulata Schltr.
- Ceratostylis sphaerocephala Schltr.
- Ceratostylis steenisii J.J.Sm.
- Ceratostylis subapoda Schuit., Y.P.Ng & H.A.Pedersen
- Ceratostylis subcoerulea P.Royen
- Ceratostylis subulata Blume
- Ceratostylis succulenta J.J.Sm.
- Ceratostylis tenericaulis Ridl.
- Ceratostylis tenuis Schltr.
- Ceratostylis tetrarioides Schltr.
- Ceratostylis thailandica Seidenf.
- Ceratostylis tjihana J.J.Sm.
- Ceratostylis todjambuensis J.J.Sm.
- Ceratostylis tonkinensis (Gagnep.) Aver.
- Ceratostylis tricallifera J.J.Sm.
- Ceratostylis triloba Schltr.
- Ceratostylis trinodis J.J.Sm.
- Ceratostylis truncata J.J.Sm.
- Ceratostylis vagans Schltr.
- Ceratostylis vonroemeri J.J.Sm.
- Ceratostylis wenzelii Ames
