= Cylindrolobus cootesii =

Scientific classification
- Kingdom: Plantae
- Clade: Tracheophytes
- Clade: Angiosperms
- Clade: Monocots
- Order: Asparagales
- Family: Orchidaceae
- Subfamily: Epidendroideae
- Genus: Cylindrolobus
- Species: C. cootesii

Binomial name
- Cylindrolobus cootesii (D.P.Banks) Suárez

Synonyms
- Eria cootesii D.P.Banks

Species of orchid

Cylindrolobus cootesii, or Cootes' cylindrolobus, is plant species of the family Orchidaceae endemic to the Philippines. It is found in the Philippines on the island of Luzon at elevations around 500 meters. It is a small to medium-sized, hot growing epiphyte with an elongated, slightly compressed stem carrying many towards the apical 1/2 to 1/3, distichous, spreading, narrow lanceolate, leathery, basally clasping leaves. It bears flowers on an axillary, .6 to .8" (1.5 to 2 cm) long, single flowered inflorescence. Cylindrolobus cootesii is named after Jim Cootes, an Australian orchid collector.
