= Ridleyella =

Scientific classification
- Kingdom: Plantae
- Clade: Tracheophytes
- Clade: Angiosperms
- Clade: Monocots
- Order: Asparagales
- Family: Orchidaceae
- Subfamily: Epidendroideae
- Tribe: Podochileae
- Genus: Ridleyella; Schltr.
- Species: R. paniculata

Binomial name
- Ridleyella paniculata (Ridl.) Schltr.

Synonyms
- Bulbophyllum paniculatum Ridl.

Species of orchids

Ridleyella is a monotypic genus of flowering plants from the orchid family, Orchidaceae. The sole species is Ridleyella paniculata, which is endemic to New Guinea.

The genus name of Ridleyella is in honour of Henry Nicholas Ridley (1855–1956), an English botanist, geologist and naturalist who lived much of his life in Singapore. He was instrumental in promoting rubber trees in the Malay Peninsula. The Latin specific epithet of paniculata is derived from paniculatus meaning panicled (a much-branched inflorescence). Both the genus and the species were first described and published in Repert. Spec. Nov. Regni Veg. Beih. Vol.1 on page 948–949 in 1913.

== See also ==
- List of Orchidaceae genera
