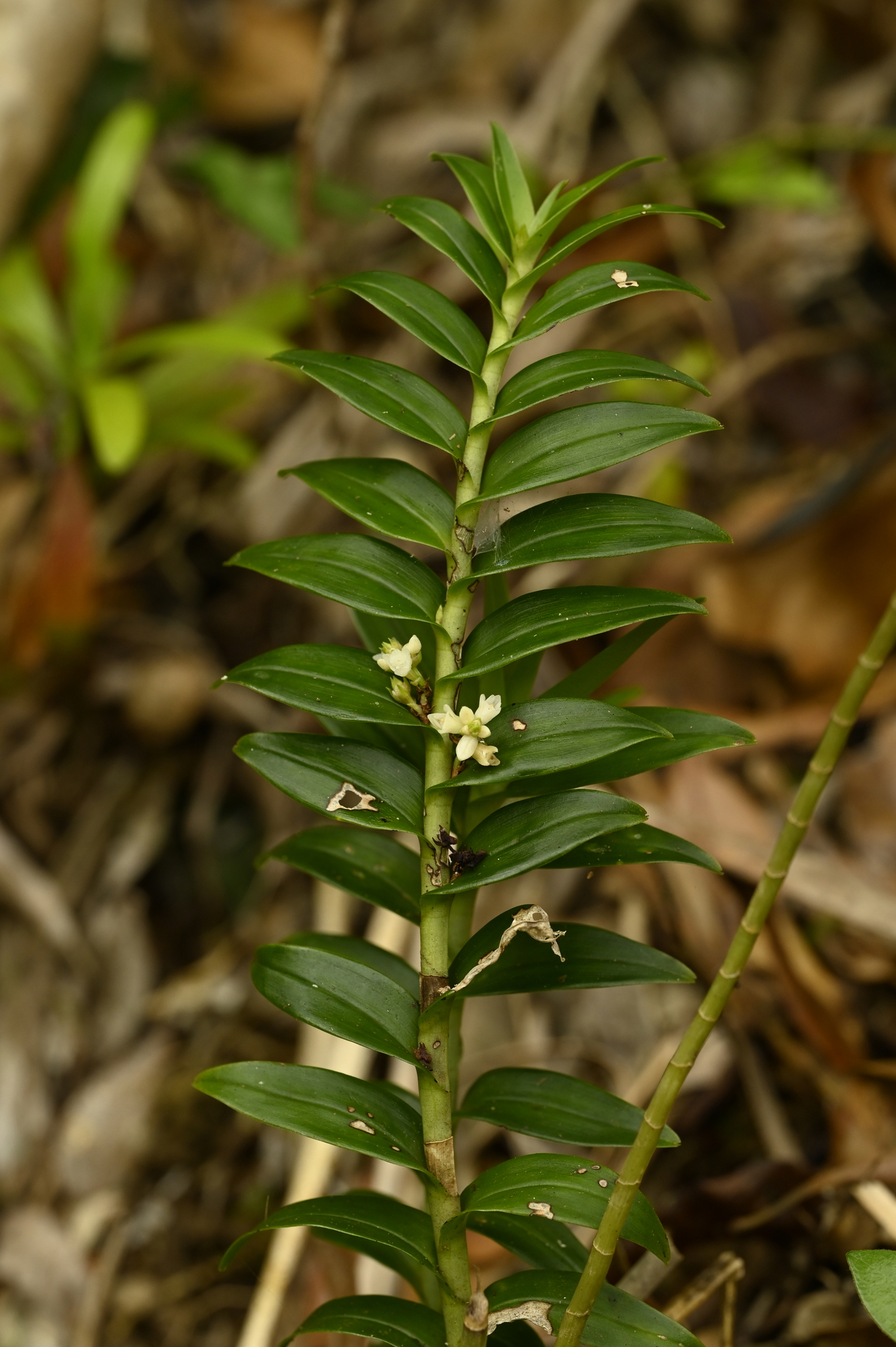
- Appendicula fenixii

Scientific classification
- Kingdom: Plantae
- Clade: Tracheophytes
- Clade: Angiosperms
- Clade: Monocots
- Order: Asparagales
- Family: Orchidaceae
- Subfamily: Epidendroideae
- Tribe: Podochileae
- Subtribe: Eriinae
- Genus: Appendicula; Blume

Synonyms
- Chilopogon Schltr.; Conchochilus Hassk.; Cyphochilus Schltr.; Lobogyne Schltr.; Metachilum Lindl.; Scoliochilus Rchb.f.

= Appendicula =

Genus of orchids

Appendicula, commonly known as stream orchids, is a genus of flowering plants in the family Orchidaceae. Orchids in this genus are epiphytic, lithophytic or rarely terrestrial plants herbs with many flat, often twisted leaves and small resupinate, white or greenish flowers. The sepals are free from each other but the lateral sepals and labellum are fused to the base of the column.

The genus Appendicula was first formally described in 1825 by Carl Ludwig Blume who published the description in Bijdragen tot de flora van Nederlandsch Indië. The name Appendicula is the diminutive form of the Latin word appendix meaning "appendage" or "addition", hence "little appendage", referring to the "inward-facing appendages on the labellum".

Orchids in the genus Appendicula occur from tropical and subtropical Asia to the western Pacific.

== List of species ==
The following is a list of species of Appendicula accepted by the Plants of the World Online as at December 2024:

- Appendicula aberrans Schltr.
- Appendicula adnata J.J.Sm.
- Appendicula alatocaulis P.O'Byrne & J.J.Verm.
- Appendicula alba Blume
- Appendicula anceps Blume
  - Appendicula anceps var. anceps.
  - Appendicula anceps var. celebica Schltr.
- Appendicula ancosiphila Ormerod
- Appendicula anemophila (Schltr.) J.J.Sm.
- Appendicula angustifolia Blume
- Appendicula annamensis Guillaumin
- Appendicula anomala (Schltr.) Schltr.
- Appendicula babiensis J.J.Sm.
- Appendicula baliensis J.J.Sm.
- Appendicula biloba J.J.Sm.
  - Appendicula biloba var. angustifolia J.J.Sm.
  - Appendicula biloba var. biloba.
- Appendicula bilobulata J.J.Wood
- Appendicula biumbonata Schltr.
- Appendicula bracteata (Schltr.) J.J.Sm.
- Appendicula bracteosa Rchb.f. in B.Seemann
- Appendicula brassii Ormerod
- Appendicula brevimentum J.J.Sm.
- Appendicula buxifolia Blume
- Appendicula calcarata Ridl.
- Appendicula calcicola Schltr.
- Appendicula callifera J.J.Sm.
- Appendicula carinifera Schltr.
- Appendicula carnosa Blume
- Appendicula celebica (Schltr.) Schltr.
- Appendicula clemensiae (Ames) Ames
- Appendicula clemensiorum J.J.Wood
- Appendicula collina (Schltr.) J.J.Sm.
- Appendicula concava Schltr.
- Appendicula congenera Blume
- Appendicula congesta Ridl.
- Appendicula cornuta Blume
- Appendicula crispa J.J.Sm.
- Appendicula cristata Blume
- Appendicula crotalina (Ames) Schltr.
- Appendicula cuneata Ames
- Appendicula cyphochiloides Ormerod
- Appendicula dajakorum J.J.Sm.
- Appendicula damusensis J.J.Sm.
- Appendicula densifolia (Ridl.) Ridl.
- Appendicula dichaeoides Ormerod
- Appendicula disticha Ridl.
- Appendicula djamuensis Schltr.
- Appendicula effusa (Schltr.) Schltr.
- Appendicula elegans Rchb.f.
- Appendicula elmeri (Ames) Ames
- Appendicula fallax Schltr.
- Appendicula fasciculata J.J.Sm.
- Appendicula fenixii (Ames) Schltr.
- Appendicula fergussoniana Ormerod
- Appendicula flaccida (Schltr.) Schltr.
- Appendicula floribunda (Schltr.) Schltr.
- Appendicula foliosa Ames
- Appendicula fractiflexa J.J.Wood
- Appendicula furfuracea J.J.Sm.
- Appendicula gjellerupii J.J.Sm.
- Appendicula goodenoughiana Ormerod
- Appendicula gracilis Aver.
- Appendicula grandifolia Schltr.
- Appendicula hexadens Ormerod
- Appendicula hexandra (J.König) J.J.Sm.
- Appendicula hooglandii Ormerod
- Appendicula humilis Schltr.
- Appendicula imbricata J.J.Sm.
- Appendicula inermis Carr
- Appendicula infundibuliformis J.J.Sm..
- Appendicula irigensis Ames
- Appendicula jacobsonii J.J.Sm.
- Appendicula kaniensis Schltr.
- Appendicula kjellbergii J.J.Sm.
- Appendicula krauseana Schltr.
- Appendicula lamprophylla Schltr..
- Appendicula latifolia (Schltr.) J.J.Sm.
- Appendicula latilabium J.J.Sm.
  - Appendicula latilabium var. latilabium.
  - Appendicula latilabium var. seramica J.J.Sm.
- Appendicula laxifolia J.J.Sm.
- Appendicula leytensis Ames
- Appendicula linearifolia Ames & C.Schweinf.
- Appendicula linearis J.J.Sm.
- Appendicula longa J.J.Sm.
- Appendicula longibracteata Ridl.
- Appendicula longirostrata Ames & C.Schweinf.
- Appendicula lucbanensis (Ames) Ames
- Appendicula lucida Ridl.
- Appendicula lutea Schltr.
- Appendicula luzonensis (Ames) Ames
- Appendicula magnibracteata Ames & C.Schweinf.
- Appendicula malindangensis (Ames) Schltr.
- Appendicula maneauensis Ormerod
- Appendicula maquilingensis Ames
- Appendicula matapensis Ormerod
- Appendicula merapohensis P.T.Ong & P.O'Byrne
- Appendicula merrillii Ames
- Appendicula mimica Ormerod
- Appendicula montana (Schltr.) J.J.Sm.
- Appendicula negrosiana (Ames) Ames
- Appendicula nicobarica Jayanthi, Sumathi & Karthig.
- Appendicula nivea (Schltr.) Schltr.
- Appendicula oblonga Schltr.
- Appendicula ovalis (Schltr.) J.J.Sm. ex Mansf.
- Appendicula oxysepala (Schltr.) J.J.Sm.
- Appendicula padangensis Schltr.
- Appendicula pandurata (Schltr.) Schltr.
- Appendicula parvifolia (Schltr.) J.J.Sm.
- Appendicula patentissima J.J.Sm.
- Appendicula pauciflora Blume
- Appendicula pendula Blume
- Appendicula penicillata Blume
- Appendicula perplexa (Ames) Ames
- Appendicula peyeriana Kraenzl.
- Appendicula pilosa J.J.Sm.
  - Appendicula pilosa var. pilosa.
  - Appendicula pilosa var. sumatrana J.J.Sm.
- Appendicula podochiloides J.J.Sm..
- Appendicula polita J.J.Sm.
- Appendicula polyantha Ames
- Appendicula polyphylla Schltr.
- Appendicula polystachya (Schltr.) Schltr.
- Appendicula pseudofractiflexa J.J.Wood
- Appendicula pseudopendula (Schltr.) Schltr.
- Appendicula purpurascens Blume
- Appendicula purpureifolia J.J.Sm.
- Appendicula ramosa Blume
- Appendicula recondita J.J.Sm.
- Appendicula reflexa Blume
  - Appendicula reflexa var. cycloglossa (Schltr.) Schltr.
  - Appendicula reflexa var. kotoensis (Hayata) T.P.Lin
  - Appendicula reflexa var. reflexa.
- Appendicula rivularis (Schltr.) J.J.Sm.
- Appendicula rostellata J.J.Sm.
- Appendicula rostrata J.J.Sm.
- Appendicula rubens (Schltr.) Schltr.
- Appendicula rupestris Ridl.
- Appendicula salicifolia J.J.Sm.
- Appendicula scissosaccus (Gilli) Ormerod
- Appendicula sepikiana Schltr.
- Appendicula seranica J.J.Sm.
- Appendicula spathilabris J.J.Sm.
- Appendicula steffensiana (Schltr.) J.J.Sm.
- Appendicula tagalensium Kraenzl.
- Appendicula tembuyukenensis J.J.Wood
- Appendicula tenuifolia J.J.Wood
  - Appendicula tenuifolia var. filiformis J.J.Wood
  - Appendicula tenuifolia var. tenuifolia.
- Appendicula tenuispica (Schltr.) Schltr.
- Appendicula theunissenii J.J.Sm.
- Appendicula togarupia Ormerod
- Appendicula topensabe Ormerod
- Appendicula torricelliana Schltr.
- Appendicula torta Blume
- Appendicula triloba (Schltr.) Schltr.
- Appendicula tubilabia J.J.Wood
- Appendicula uncata Ridl.
  - Appendicula uncata subsp. sarawakensis J.J.Wood
  - Appendicula uncata subsp. uncata.
- Appendicula undulata Blume
  - Appendicula uncata subsp. sarawakensis J.J.Wood
  - Appendicula uncata subsp. uncata.
- Appendicula vanimoensis Ormerod
- Appendicula verruculifera J.J.Sm.
- Appendicula wariana (Schltr.) Ormerod
- Appendicula weberi Ames
- Appendicula werneri Schltr.
- Appendicula wibowojuswara J.M.H.Shaw
- Appendicula xytriophora Rchb.f
