= Cylindrolobus aporoides =

Scientific classification
- Kingdom: Plantae
- Clade: Tracheophytes
- Clade: Angiosperms
- Clade: Monocots
- Order: Asparagales
- Family: Orchidaceae
- Subfamily: Epidendroideae
- Genus: Cylindrolobus
- Species: C. aporoides

Binomial name
- Cylindrolobus aporoides (Lindl.) Rauschert

Species of plant

Cylindrolobus aporoides is a species of plant within the orchid family. It is native to New Guinea, the Philippines, and Sulawesi.
