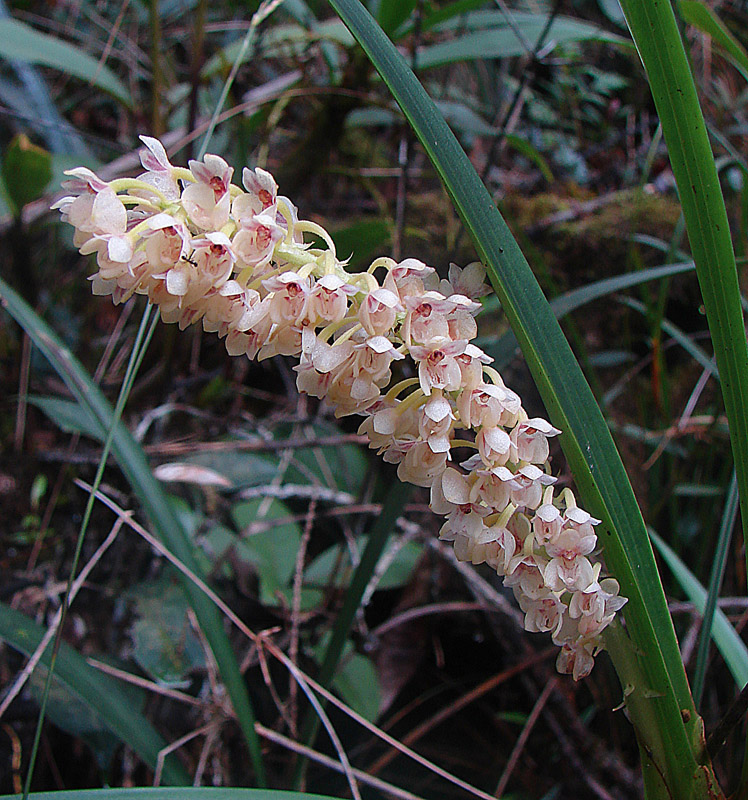
- Cymboglossum grande

Scientific classification
- Kingdom: Plantae
- Clade: Tracheophytes
- Clade: Angiosperms
- Clade: Monocots
- Order: Asparagales
- Family: Orchidaceae
- Subfamily: Epidendroideae
- Tribe: Podochileae
- Subtribe: Eriinae
- Genus: Cymboglossum (Schltr.) Rauschert

Species
- See text.

Synonyms
- Ascidieria Seidenf.; Eria section Cymboglossum Schltr.

= Cymboglossum =

Genus of orchids

Cymboglossum, synonym Ascidieria, is a genus of flowering plants from the orchid family, Orchidaceae. It is native to Borneo, the Philippines, Sulawesi and Sumatra.

== Taxonomy ==
The genus was first described as a section of Eria, E. sect. Cymboglossum, by Rudolf Schlechter in 1911. In 1981, Friedrich Gustav Brieger raised it to the rank of genus, but did not correctly cite the basionym, so his name was not acceptable. In 1983, Stephan Rauschert corrected Brieger's mistake, thus validating the genus name. In 1984, Gunnar Seidenfaden established the genus Ascidieria. A 2018 molecular phylogenetic study of the tribe Podochileae showed that Ascidieria and Cymboglossum should be merged. However, the authors of this study were not aware of Rauschert's validation of the name Cymboglossum, and incorrectly merged the two genera under the name Ascidieria. As of August 2023 some sources continue to use this name, while others use the correct Cymboglossum.

=== Species ===
As of August 2023, Plants of the World Online accepted the following species:

- Cymboglossum caricifolium (J.J.Wood) Ormerod & Cootes, syn. Ascidieria caricifolia
- Cymboglossum cymbidiifolium (Ridl.) Ormerod & Cootes, syn. Ascidieria cymbidifolia
- Cymboglossum cymbiforme (J.J.Sm.) Rauschert
- Cymboglossum grande (Ridl.) Ormerod & Cootes, syn. Ascidieria grandis
- Cymboglossum longifolium (Hook.f.) Rauschert, syn. Ascidieria longifolia
- Cymboglossum maculiflorum (J.J.Wood) Ormerod & Cootes, syn. Ascidieria maculiflora
- Cymboglossum maculosum (Cabactulan, Cootes, M.Leon & R.B.Pimentel) Ormerod & Cootes
- Cymboglossum palawanense (Ames) Ormerod & Cootes, syn. Ascidieria palawanensis
- Cymboglossum pseudocymbiforme (J.J.Wood) Ormerod & Cootes, syn. Ascidieria pseudocymbiformis
- Cymboglossum zamboangense (Ames) Ormerod & Cootes, Ascidieria zamboangensis

== See also ==
- List of Orchidaceae genera
