= Aeridostachya feddeana =

Scientific classification
- Kingdom: Plantae
- Clade: Tracheophytes
- Clade: Angiosperms
- Clade: Monocots
- Order: Asparagales
- Family: Orchidaceae
- Subfamily: Epidendroideae
- Genus: Aeridostachya
- Species: A. feddeana

Binomial name
- Aeridostachya feddeana (Schltr.) Brieger

Species of flowering plant

Aeridostachya feddeana is a species of plant within the orchid family. It is native to New Guinea.
