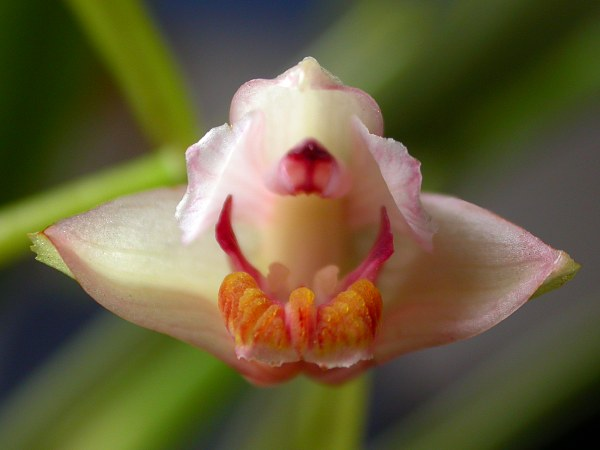
- Cryptochilus roseus (type species)

Scientific classification
- Kingdom: Plantae
- Clade: Tracheophytes
- Clade: Angiosperms
- Clade: Monocots
- Order: Asparagales
- Family: Orchidaceae
- Subfamily: Epidendroideae
- Tribe: Podochileae
- Subtribe: Eriinae
- Genus: Cryptochilus; Wall.

= Cryptochilus =

Genus of orchids

Cryptochilus is a genus of flowering plants from the orchid family, Orchidaceae. Its species are native to China, the Himalayas, and Indochina.

== Species ==
As of March 2021, Plants of the World Online accepted the following species:

- Cryptochilus acuminatus (Griff.) Schuit., Y.P.Ng & H.A.Pedersen
- Cryptochilus ctenostachyus Gagnep. - Vietnam
- Cryptochilus luteus Lindl. - Yunnan, Assam, Bhutan, Nepal, Myanmar, Vietnam
- Cryptochilus petelotii Gagnep. - Vietnam
- Cryptochilus roseus (Lindl.) S.C.Chen & J.J.Wood - Hainan, Hong Kong
- Cryptochilus sanguineus Wall. - Yunnan, Assam, Bhutan, Nepal, Myanmar, Vietnam
- Cryptochilus siamensis (Schltr.) Schuit., Y.P.Ng & H.A.Pedersen
- Cryptochilus strictus (Lindl.) Schuit., Y.P.Ng & H.A.Pedersen

== See also ==
- List of Orchidaceae genera
