= Aeridostachya acuminata =

Scientific classification
- Kingdom: Plantae
- Clade: Tracheophytes
- Clade: Angiosperms
- Clade: Monocots
- Order: Asparagales
- Family: Orchidaceae
- Subfamily: Epidendroideae
- Genus: Aeridostachya
- Species: A. acuminata

Binomial name
- Aeridostachya acuminata (Blume) Rauschert

Synonyms
- Aeridostachya malleifera (Kraenzl.) Rauschert; Dendrolirium acuminatum Blume; Eria acuminata (Blume) Lindl.; Eria cooperi Summerh.; Eria malleifera Kraenzl.; Pinalia acuminata (Blume) Kuntze

Species of orchid

Aeridostachya acuminata, synonym Eria acuminata, is a species of plant within the orchid family.
