= Xenophyllum acerosum =

Conservation status
- Endangered (IUCN 3.1)

Scientific classification
- Kingdom: Plantae
- Clade: Tracheophytes
- Clade: Angiosperms
- Clade: Eudicots
- Clade: Asterids
- Order: Asterales
- Family: Asteraceae
- Genus: Xenophyllum
- Species: X. acerosum

Binomial name
- Xenophyllum acerosum (Cuatrec.) V.A.Funk

Species of plant

Xenophyllum acerosum is a species of flowering plant in the family Asteraceae. It is found only in Ecuador. Its natural habitat is subtropical or tropical dry shrubland. It is threatened by habitat loss.
