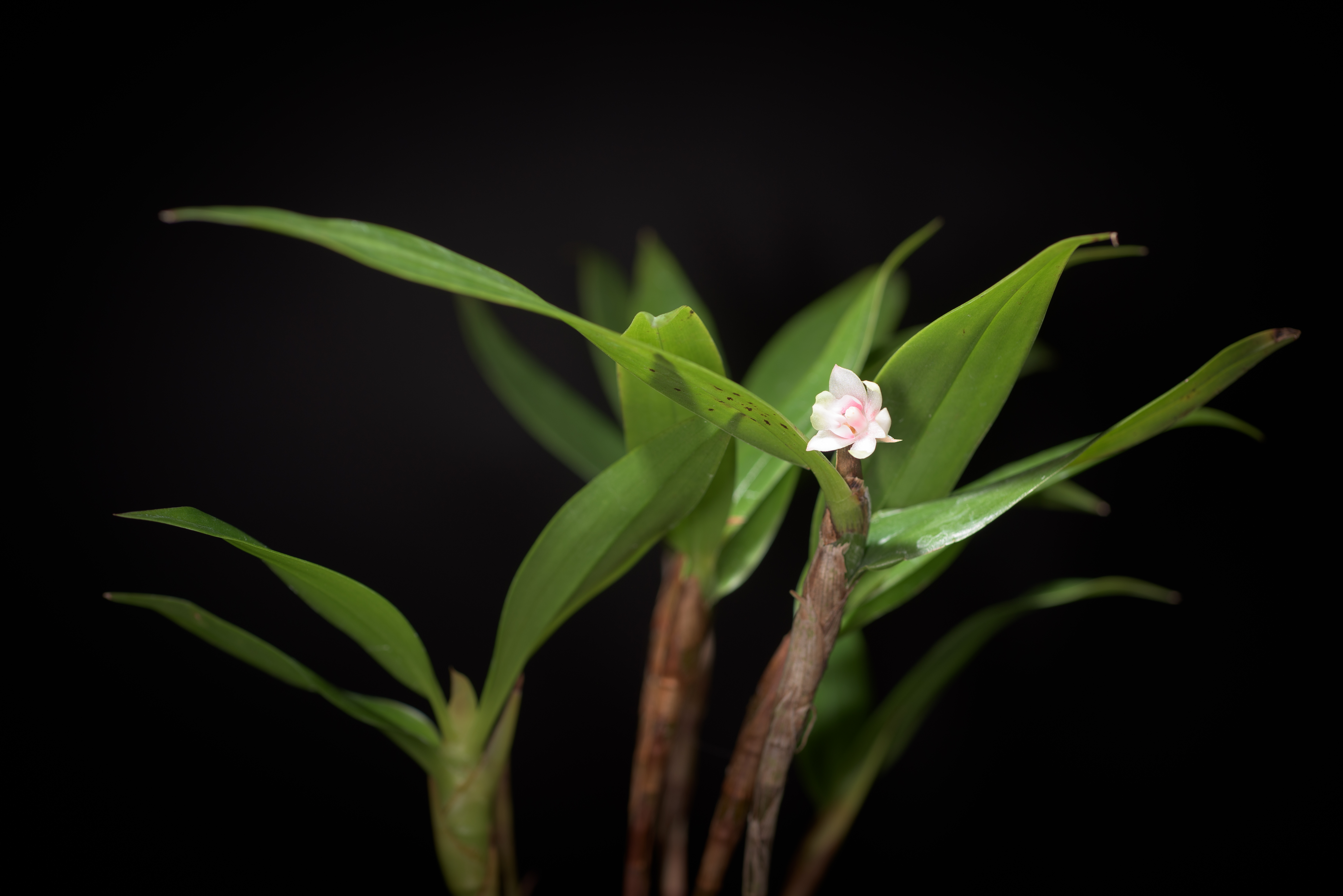
- Cylindrolobus sp. (Vietnam)

Scientific classification
- Kingdom: Plantae
- Clade: Tracheophytes
- Clade: Angiosperms
- Clade: Monocots
- Order: Asparagales
- Family: Orchidaceae
- Subfamily: Epidendroideae
- Tribe: Podochileae
- Subtribe: Eriinae
- Genus: Cylindrolobus; Blume

Type species
- Cylindrolobus compressus (Blume) Brieger (Blume) Brieger

Synonyms
- Ceratium Blume

= Cylindrolobus =

Genus of plants in the Orchidaceae from New Guinea, Asian Tropics and China

Cylindrolobus is a genus of orchids with about 80 species that grow in New Guinea, Wallacea, Southeast Asia, southern China, and India.

== Description ==
These herbs are epiphytic, but also rarely terrestrial. The elongate stems are slender and usually not pseudobulbous (though some species do possess a few terminal internodes, sometimes slightly swollen), with leaves along the entire length, except for some nodes at the base where persistent leaf sheaths have formed, or with some leaves towards the end/apex. The leathery leaves are alternate, conduplicate, and their shape can be linear-oblanceolate, or either narrowly elliptic or ovate. The leaves articulate to a sheathing base that tightly envelopes the stem. The usually short or slender inflorescences occur either laterally on many nodes or come from the terminal node of the stem, and have only 1 or 2-3 flowers. The peduncle is usually very much reduced. The few floral bracts are spirally arranged (in a few species they are conspicuous, brightly coloured and fleshy). The flowers are mostly coloured white or cream, though some species have ochre-yellow flowers. Flowers are medium-sized, glabrous (smooth) or with sparse stellate-hairs on the abaxial surface to the sepals. Pedicel and ovary are glabrous. Sepals vary, dorsally they are free, often recurved, while the lateral sepals are oblique at the base, forming with column foot a blunt oblique mentum. The petals are free and small than the sepals, their curved lip is three-lobed, hinged to a column foot, and adorned with a papillose, subglobose callus and either papillose keels or laminate keels. The lateral lobes are erect, and enclose the column. In most species the mid-lobe is smaller than lateral-lobes. The short column has a foot shorter than or about as long as the column proper. There are 8 rectangular pollinia, arranged in pair-series, a large and a small in each pair, with the posterior 4 are much smaller.

The few-flowered, glabrous axillary inflorescence is a diagnostic trait amongst sympodial taxa in the Epidendroideae subfamily p.p.

== Distribution ==
The species of Cylindrolobus grow from New Guinea to Tropical Asia to south Zhōngguó/China. Countries and regions that members of the taxa grow in include: New Guinea, Lesser Sunda Islands, Maluku, Sulawesi, Philippines, Borneo, Java, Sumatra, Malaya, Thailand, Cambodia, Vietnam, Laos, Myanmar, Assam, East Himalaya, India, Tibet, and South Central China.

== Species ==
- Cylindrolobus alboluteus (Rolfe) J.J.Wood
- Cylindrolobus aliciae (Quisumb.) Suárez
- Cylindrolobus aporoides (Lindl.) Rauschert
- Cylindrolobus arunachalensis (A.N.Rao) A.N.Rao
- Cylindrolobus aurantiacus (Kraenzl.) J.J.Wood
- Cylindrolobus beccarianus (Kraenzl.) J.J.Wood
- Cylindrolobus benchaii J.J.Wood & A.L.Lamb
- Cylindrolobus benmabantae Cabactulan, Cootes, M.Leon & R.B.Pimentel
- Cylindrolobus bidupensis (Gagnep.) Schuit., Y.P.Ng & H.A.Pedersen
- Cylindrolobus biflorus (Griff.) Rauschert
- Cylindrolobus brachystachyus (Rchb.f.) Rauschert
- Cylindrolobus burleyi (Ormerod) J.J.Wood
- Cylindrolobus carneus (J.J.Sm.) J.J.Wood
- Cylindrolobus carunculosus (Gagnep.) Schuit., Y.P.Ng & H.A.Pedersen
- Cylindrolobus clavicaulis (Wall. ex Lindl.) Rauschert
- Cylindrolobus clemensiorum (Ormerod) J.J.Wood
- Cylindrolobus compressus (Blume) Brieger
- Cylindrolobus cootesii (D.P.Banks) Suárez
- Cylindrolobus cristatus (Rolfe) S.C.Chen & J.J.Wood
- Cylindrolobus cyrtosepalus (Schltr.) Schuit., Y.P.Ng & H.A.Pedersen
- Cylindrolobus dacrydium (Gagnep.) Schuit., Y.P.Ng & H.A.Pedersen
- Cylindrolobus datuguinae Naive, M.Leon & Buenavista
- Cylindrolobus dentrecasteauxii (Kraenzl.) Schuit., Y.P.Ng & H.A.Pedersen
- Cylindrolobus dilutus (Ridl.) Schuit., Y.P.Ng & H.A.Pedersen
- Cylindrolobus elatus J.J.Wood
- Cylindrolobus elisheae (P.O'Byrne) J.J.Wood
- Cylindrolobus erythrostictus (Ridl.) Rauschert
- Cylindrolobus exappendiculatus (J.J.Sm.) Rauschert
- Cylindrolobus fastigiatifolius (Ames) Suárez
- Cylindrolobus fimbrilobus (J.J.Sm.) Schuit., Y.P.Ng & H.A.Pedersen
- Cylindrolobus foetidus (Aver.) Schuit., Y.P.Ng & H.A.Pedersen
- Cylindrolobus glabriflorus X.H.Jin & J.D.Ya
- Cylindrolobus glandulifer (Deori & Phukan) A.N.Rao
- Cylindrolobus gloensis (Ormerod & Agrawala) Schuit., Y.P.Ng & H.A.Pedersen
- Cylindrolobus gramineus (Ridl.) Rauschert
- Cylindrolobus gretcheniae (Ormerod) Schuit., Y.P.Ng & H.A.Pedersen
- Cylindrolobus hallieri (J.J.Sm.) Rauschert
- Cylindrolobus hegdei (Agrawala & H.J.Chowdhery) A.N.Rao
- Cylindrolobus jensenianus (J.J.Sm.) Rauschert
- Cylindrolobus kalabakanensis J.J.Wood & A.L.Lamb
- Cylindrolobus kalelotong (P.O'Byrne & J.J.Verm.) Schuit., Y.P.Ng & H.A.Pedersen
- Cylindrolobus kandarianus (Kraenzl.) Rauschert
- Cylindrolobus kenejianus (Schltr.) Rauschert
- Cylindrolobus korinchensis (Ridl.) Schuit., Y.P.Ng & H.A.Pedersen
- Cylindrolobus lamonganensis (Rchb.f.) Schuit., Y.P.Ng & H.A.Pedersen
- Cylindrolobus leptocarpus (Hook.f.) J.J.Wood
- Cylindrolobus leucanthus (Ridl.) Rauschert
- Cylindrolobus lindleyi (Thwaites) Ormerod & C.S.Kumar
- Cylindrolobus linearifolius (Merr.) J.J.Wood
- Cylindrolobus lohitensis (A.N.Rao, Harid. & S.N.Hedge) A.N.Rao
- Cylindrolobus longerepens (Ridl.) Rauschert
- Cylindrolobus longissimus (Ames & Quisumb.) J.J.Wood
- Cylindrolobus longpasiaensis J.J.Wood & A.L.Lamb
- Cylindrolobus marginatus (Rolfe) S.C.Chen & J.J.Wood
- Cylindrolobus megalophus (Ridl.) Schuit., Y.P.Ng & H.A.Pedersen
- Cylindrolobus microbambusa (Kraenzl.) Schuit., Y.P.Ng & H.A.Pedersen
- Cylindrolobus motuoensis X.H.Jin & J.D.Ya
- Cylindrolobus mucronatus (Lindl.) Rauschert
- Cylindrolobus neglectus (Ridl.) J.J.Wood
- Cylindrolobus nutans (Lindl.) J.J.Wood
- Cylindrolobus oliviacamposiae Naive, Mabanta & Cootes
- Cylindrolobus pauciflorus (Wight) Schuit., Y.P.Ng & H.A.Pedersen
- Cylindrolobus perspicabile (Ames) Suárez
- Cylindrolobus pinguis (Ridl.) Rauschert
- Cylindrolobus pseudoclavicaulis (Blatt.) Schuit., Y.P.Ng & H.A.Pedersen
- Cylindrolobus pseudorigidus (Ormerod) Schuit., Y.P.Ng & H.A.Pedersen
- Cylindrolobus puakensis (Ormerod) J.J.Wood
- Cylindrolobus quadricolor (J.J.Sm.) Rauschert
- Cylindrolobus rhodoleucus (Schltr.) Brieger
- Cylindrolobus tenuicaulis (S.C.Chen & Z.H.Tsi) S.C.Chen & J.J.Wood
- Cylindrolobus truncatus (Lindl.) Rauschert
- Cylindrolobus uniflorus (J.J.Wood) Y.P.Ng & P.O'Byrne
- Cylindrolobus uninodus P.O'Byrne & J.J.Verm.
- Cylindrolobus validus (Lindl.) Rauschert
- Cylindrolobus verruculosus (J.J.Sm.) Rauschert
- Cylindrolobus virginalis (Schltr.) Rauschert
- Cylindrolobus warianus (Schltr.) Brieger
- Cylindrolobus warnementiae (Ormerod) J.J.Wood
