= Pseuderia =

Scientific classification
- Kingdom: Plantae
- Clade: Tracheophytes
- Clade: Angiosperms
- Clade: Monocots
- Order: Asparagales
- Family: Orchidaceae
- Subfamily: Epidendroideae
- Tribe: Podochileae
- Subtribe: Eriinae
- Genus: Pseuderia; Schltr.

Genus of orchids

Pseuderia is a genus of orchids consisting of about 20 species distributed from the Moluccas through New Guinea to Samoa, Fiji and Micronesia. The genus has its center of diversity in New Guinea.

Species accepted as of June 2014:

- Pseuderia amblyornidis (Rchb.f.) Ormerod - New Guinea
- Pseuderia brevifolia J.J.Sm. - New Guinea
- Pseuderia diversifolia J.J.Sm. - New Guinea
- Pseuderia floribunda Schltr. - New Guinea
- Pseuderia foliosa (Brongn.) Schltr. - Maluku, New Guinea
- Pseuderia frutex (Schltr.) Schltr. - New Guinea
- Pseuderia ledermannii Schltr. - New Guinea
- Pseuderia micronesiaca Schltr. - Pohnpei
- Pseuderia nigricans Ridl. - New Guinea
- Pseuderia pauciflora Schltr. - New Guinea
- Pseuderia platyphylla L.O.Williams - Fiji
- Pseuderia ramosa L.O.Williams - Samoa, Futuna
- Pseuderia robusta Schltr. - New Guinea
- Pseuderia samarana Meneses, Z.D. & Cootes, J - Philippines
- Pseuderia sepikana Schltr. - New Guinea
- Pseuderia similis (Schltr.) Schltr. - New Guinea, Solomon Islands, Santa Cruz Islands
- Pseuderia smithiana C.Schweinf. - Fiji
- Pseuderia sympodialis J.J.Sm. - New Guinea
- Pseuderia takeuchii Ormerod - Papua New Guinea
- Pseuderia trachychila (Kraenzl.) Schltr.
- Pseuderia wariana Schltr. - New Guinea
