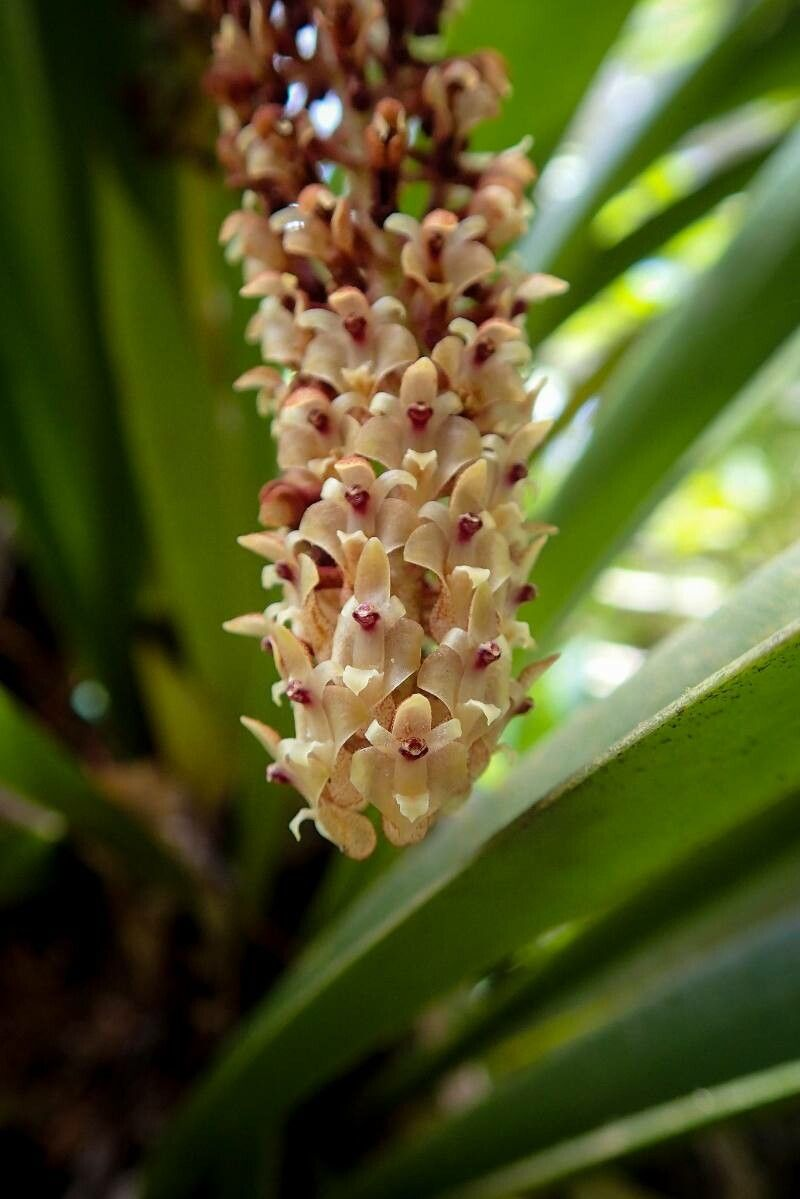
- Aeridostachya robusta

Scientific classification
- Kingdom: Plantae
- Clade: Tracheophytes
- Clade: Angiosperms
- Clade: Monocots
- Order: Asparagales
- Family: Orchidaceae
- Subfamily: Epidendroideae
- Tribe: Podochileae
- Subtribe: Eriinae
- Genus: Aeridostachya (Hook.f.) Brieger

= Aeridostachya =

Genus of orchids

Aeridostachya is a genus of orchids.

== Species ==
As of March 2021, Plants of the World Online accepts the following species:

- Aeridostachya acuminata (Blume) Rauschert
- Aeridostachya clavimentalis (Ridl.) Rauschert
- Aeridostachya coffeicolor (Kraenzl.) Rauschert
- Aeridostachya crassipes (Ridl.) Rauschert
- Aeridostachya dasystachys (Ridl.) Rauschert
- Aeridostachya decurrentipetala (J.J.Sm.) Rauschert
- Aeridostachya dulitensis (Carr) Schuit., Y.P.Ng & H.A.Pedersen
- Aeridostachya feddeana (Schltr.) Brieger
- Aeridostachya gobiensis (Schltr.) Rauschert
- Aeridostachya junghuhnii (J.J.Sm.) Brieger
- Aeridostachya macrophylla (Ames & C.Schweinf.) J.J.Wood
- Aeridostachya mearnsii (Leav.) Rauschert
- Aeridostachya odontoglossa (Schltr.) Rauschert
- Aeridostachya ovilis (J.J.Sm.) Rauschert
- Aeridostachya propinqua (Ames) W.Suarez & Cootes
- Aeridostachya robusta (Blume) Brieger
- Aeridostachya sumatrensis (Ridl.) Rauschert
- Aeridostachya trichotaenia (Schltr.) Brieger
- Aeridostachya unifolia (J.J.Sm.) Rauschert
- Aeridostachya vulcanica (Schltr.) Brieger
