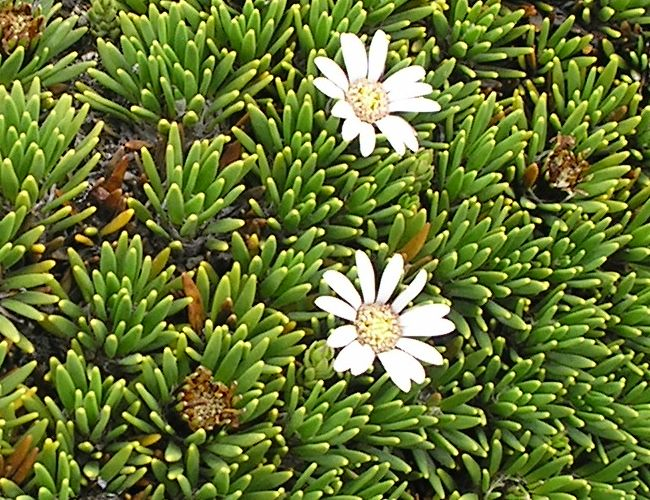
- Xenophyllum humile

Scientific classification
- Kingdom: Plantae
- Clade: Tracheophytes
- Clade: Angiosperms
- Clade: Eudicots
- Clade: Asterids
- Order: Asterales
- Family: Asteraceae
- Subfamily: Asteroideae
- Tribe: Senecioneae
- Genus: Xenophyllum; V.A.Funk

= Xenophyllum =

Genus of flowering plants

Xenophyllum is a genus of flowering plant in the family Asteraceae. The genus was erected in 1997 for several species formerly treated in genus Werneria. These plants grow in the high mountains of the Andes.

These species grow from rhizomes and form tight mats on the ground. Most have white ray florets and yellow or white disc florets.

Species include:

- Xenophyllum acerosum
- Xenophyllum amblydactylum
- Xenophyllum ciliolatum
- Xenophyllum crassum
- Xenophyllum dactylophyllum
- Xenophyllum decorum
- Xenophyllum digitatum
- Xenophyllum esquilachense
- Xenophyllum fontii
- Xenophyllum humile
- Xenophyllum incisum
- Xenophyllum lycopodioides
- Xenophyllum marcidum
- Xenophyllum poposum
- Xenophyllum pseudodigitatum
- Xenophyllum rigidum
- Xenophyllum rosenii
- Xenophyllum roseum
- Xenophyllum sotarense
- Xenophyllum staffordiae
- Xenophyllum weddellii
