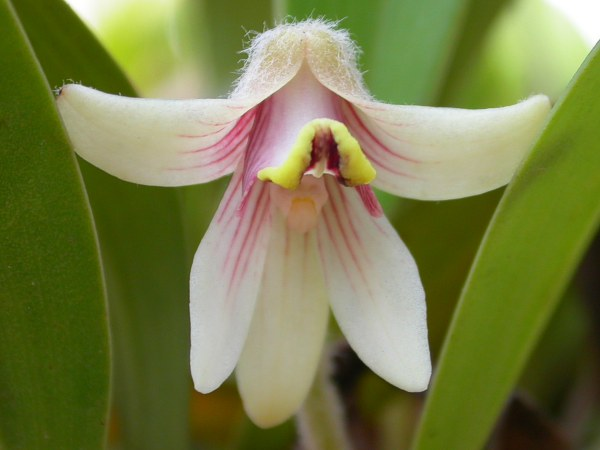
- Campanulorchis globifera

Scientific classification
- Kingdom: Plantae
- Clade: Tracheophytes
- Clade: Angiosperms
- Clade: Monocots
- Order: Asparagales
- Family: Orchidaceae
- Subfamily: Epidendroideae
- Tribe: Podochileae
- Subtribe: Eriinae
- Genus: Campanulorchis; Brieger

= Campanulorchis =

Genus of orchids

Campanulorchis is a genus of orchids. It was considered a synonym of the genus Eria, but eventually it has become an accepted name. It is native to Southeast Asia from Hainan to New Guinea.

== Species ==
Five species are recognized as of May 2014:

- Campanulorchis globifera (Rolfe) Brieger in F.R.R.Schlechter - Vietnam
- Campanulorchis leiophylla (Lindl.) Y.P.Ng & P.J.Cribb - Borneo, Malaysia, Maluku, Sulawesi, Sumatra
- Campanulorchis longipes (Gagnep.) J.Ponert - Vietnam
- Campanulorchis pellipes (Rchb.f. ex Hook.f.) Y.P.Ng & P.J.Cribb - Thailand, Borneo, Malaysia, Sumatra
- Campanulorchis pseudoleiophylla (J.J.Wood) J.J.Wood - Borneo, Sulawesi, New Guinea
- Campanulorchis thao (Gagnep.) S.C.Chen & J.J.Wood - Vietnam, Hainan
