= Aeridostachya vulcanica =

Scientific classification
- Kingdom: Plantae
- Clade: Tracheophytes
- Clade: Angiosperms
- Clade: Monocots
- Order: Asparagales
- Family: Orchidaceae
- Subfamily: Epidendroideae
- Genus: Aeridostachya
- Species: A. vulcanica

Binomial name
- Aeridostachya vulcanica (Schltr.) Brieger

Synonyms
- Eria vulcania Schltr.

Species of orchid

Aeridostachya vulcanica is a species of plant within the orchid family. It is native to Sulawesi.
