= Pseuderia samarana =

Conservation status
- Critically Endangered (IUCN 3.1)

Scientific classification
- Kingdom: Plantae
- Clade: Tracheophytes
- Clade: Angiosperms
- Clade: Monocots
- Order: Asparagales
- Family: Orchidaceae
- Subfamily: Epidendroideae
- Genus: Pseuderia
- Species: P. samarana

Binomial name
- Pseuderia samarana Z. D. Meneses & J. Cootes, 2019

Species of orchid

Pseuderia samarana is an endemic species of plant in the family Orchidaceae found in Samar Island and is the first generic record for the genus Pseuderia in the Philippines. The species is initially terrestrial during its seedling stage, then becomes epiphytic upon reaching maturity. It shared similarities with P. floribunda, and P. frutex. However, the species scented, 2-flowered inflorescence significantly differs from the latter, along with its narrower labellum and the characteristically entire clinandrium margins. The species is considered Critically Endangered, and is found only in top portion of forest over limestone, and is threatened by land use conversion, timber poaching, and slash-and-burn farming.

== Description ==
Pseuderia samarana is an initially terrestrial orchid during its seedling stage, then becomes epiphytic upon reaching maturity. The scented flowers, 1.5–1.6 centimetres (0.59–0.63 in) by 1.1–1.4 centimetres (0.43–0.55 in) are yellow in color with reddish-purple markings, borne on 2-flowered inflorescence, in a short peduncle 5–6 millimetres (0.20–0.24 in) long. The labellum is measured as 7–8 millimetres (0.28–0.31 in) by 2–2.5 millimetres (0.079–0.098 in), naturally curved, elliptic-rhombic in shaped, and sparsely puberulous. The clinandrium has a characteristically entire margin. The leaves have two secondary veins on both sides of the midvein, and is thinly lanceolate measuring 4.8–9.5 centimetres (1.9–3.7 in) by 1.5–1.7 centimetres (0.59–0.67 in). The erect, terete, branching stems can reach lengths of up to 1 metre (39 in) having a diameter of up to 2.2 millimetres (0.087 in) on leafless parts, and 2–3.1 millimetres (0.079–0.122 in) on leafy parts.

== Taxonomy and naming ==
The species is named from its type province of Samar, where this place forms the large portion of Samar Island Natural Park.

== Distribution and habitat ==
This endemic orchid species is only known from near Samar Island, Philippines on forests over limestone formation with an elevation of 250-880 m.

== Conservation ==
As assessed, P. samarana is calculated to have an area of occupancy of 8 km^{2} and an extent of occurrence as 0.166 km^{2}. Also, the species is can only be found on top portion of forest over limestone in its type locality, where its small population of 20-30 species are threatened by land use conversion and timber poaching, among others. With these factors, P. samarana is placed under the IUCN3.1 criteria as Critically Endangered.
