= Dilochiopsis =

Scientific classification
- Kingdom: Plantae
- Clade: Tracheophytes
- Clade: Angiosperms
- Clade: Monocots
- Order: Asparagales
- Family: Orchidaceae
- Subfamily: Epidendroideae
- Tribe: Podochileae
- Subtribe: Eriinae
- Genus: Dilochiopsis (Hook.f.) Brieger in F.R.R.Schlechter
- Species: D. scortechinii

Binomial name
- Dilochiopsis scortechinii (Hook.f.) Brieger in F.R.R.Schlechter

Synonyms
- Eria scortechinii Hook.f.; Pinalia scortechinii (Hook.f.) Kuntze

Genus of orchids

Dilochiopsis is a genus of orchids. It was previously considered as a synonym of the genus Eria, but eventually it has become an accepted name. At present (June 2014), there is only one known species, Dilochiopsis scortechinii, endemic to peninsular Malaysia.
