= Epiblastus =

Scientific classification
- Kingdom: Plantae
- Clade: Tracheophytes
- Clade: Angiosperms
- Clade: Monocots
- Order: Asparagales
- Family: Orchidaceae
- Subfamily: Epidendroideae
- Tribe: Podochileae
- Subtribe: Eriinae
- Genus: Epiblastus; Schltr.

Genus of orchids

Epiblastus is a genus of orchids with 22 known species distributed from New Guinea, Philippines, Maluku, Sulawesi, Fiji, the Solomons, the Bismarcks, Samoa and Vanuatu.

== Species ==
- Epiblastus accretus J.J.Sm.
- Epiblastus acuminatus Schltr.
- Epiblastus auriculatus Schltr.
- Epiblastus basalis Schltr.
- Epiblastus buruensis J.J.Sm.
- Epiblastus chimbuensis P.Royen
- Epiblastus cuneatus J.J.Sm.
- Epiblastus kerigomnensis P.Royen
- Epiblastus lancipetalus Schltr.
- Epiblastus masarangicus (Kraenzl.) Schltr.
- Epiblastus merrillii L.O.Williams
- Epiblastus montihageni P.Royen
- Epiblastus mutabilis Ormerod
- Epiblastus neohibernicus Schltr.
- Epiblastus ornithidioides Schltr.
- Epiblastus pteroglotta Gilli
- Epiblastus pulchellus Schltr.
- Epiblastus pullei J.J.Sm.
- Epiblastus schultzei Schltr.
- Epiblastus sciadanthus (F.Muell.) Schltr.
- Epiblastus torricellensis Schltr.
- Epiblastus tuberculatus R.S.Rogers
- Epiblastus unguiculatus (J.J.Sm.) Ormerod
