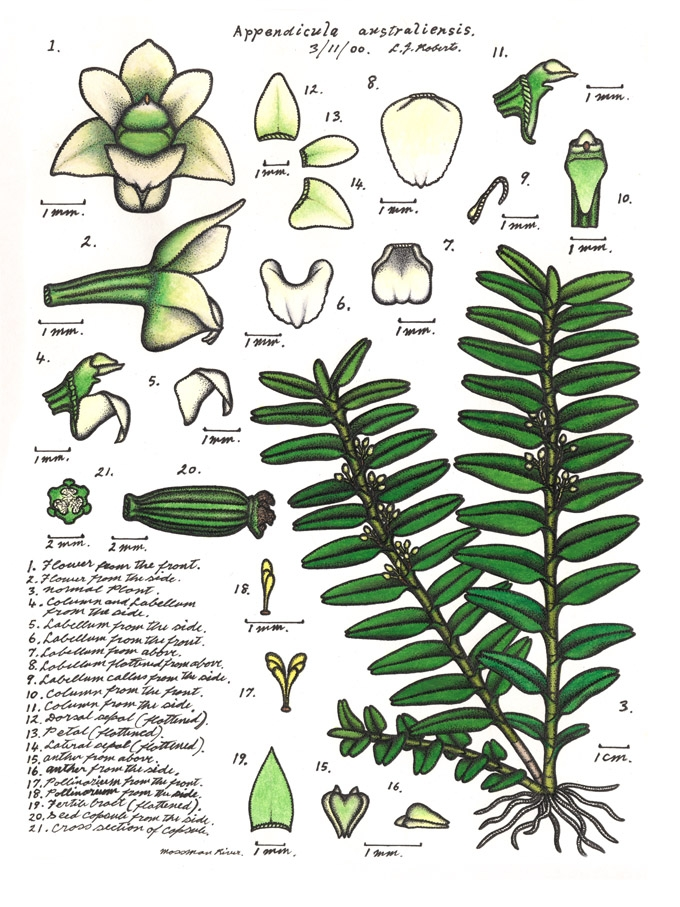
- Podochilus australiensis

Scientific classification
- Kingdom: Plantae
- Clade: Embryophytes
- Clade: Tracheophytes
- Clade: Spermatophytes
- Clade: Angiosperms
- Clade: Monocots
- Order: Asparagales
- Family: Orchidaceae
- Subfamily: Epidendroideae
- Tribe: Podochileae
- Subtribe: Eriinae
- Genus: Podochilus; Schltr.

Type species
- Podochilus lucescens Blume

Synonyms
- Apista Blume; Cryptoglottis Blume; Platysma Blume; Placostigma Blume; Hexameria R. Br.

= Podochilus =

Genus of orchids

Podochilus is a genus of about 65 species of small, moss-like epiphytic orchids, distributed across China, the Indian subcontinent, Southeast Asia (Indochina, Indonesia, Philippines, etc.,) New Guinea, Australia and the Solomon Islands.

== List of species ==
The following is a list of species of Podochilus accepted by the World Checklist of Selected Plant Families as at January 2019:

- Podochilus anguinus Schltr.
- Podochilus appendiculatus J.J.Sm.
- Podochilus auriculigerus Schltr.
- Podochilus australiensis (F.M.Bailey) Schltr.
- Podochilus banaensis Ormerod
- Podochilus bancanus J.J.Sm.
- Podochilus bicaudatus Schltr.
- Podochilus bilabiatus J.J.Sm.
- Podochilus bilobulatus Schltr.
- Podochilus bimaculatus Schltr.
- Podochilus cucullatus J.J.Sm.
- Podochilus cultratus Lindl.
- Podochilus cumingii Schltr.
- Podochilus densiflorus Blume
- Podochilus falcatus Lindl.
- Podochilus falcipetalus Schltr.
- Podochilus filiformis Schltr.
- Podochilus forficuloides J.J.Sm.
- Podochilus gracilis (Blume) Lindl.
- Podochilus hellwigii Schltr.
- Podochilus hystricinus Ames
- Podochilus imitans Schltr.
- Podochilus intermedius J.J.Sm.
- Podochilus intricatus Ames
- Podochilus khasianus Hook.f.
- Podochilus klossii Ormerod
- Podochilus lamii J.J.Sm.
- Podochilus lancilabris Schltr.
- Podochilus lobatipetalus J.J.Sm.
- Podochilus longilabris Ames
- Podochilus lucescens Blume
- Podochilus malabaricus Wight
- Podochilus marsupialis Schuit.
- Podochilus mentawaiensis J.J.Sm.
- Podochilus microphyllus Lindl.
- Podochilus minahassae Schltr.
- Podochilus muricatus (Teijsm. & Binn.) Schltr.
- Podochilus obovatipetalus J.J.Sm.
- Podochilus oxyphyllus Schltr.
- Podochilus oxystophylloides Ormerod
- Podochilus pachyrhizus Schltr.
- Podochilus plumosus Ames
- Podochilus polytrichoides Schltr.
- Podochilus ramosii Ames
- Podochilus rhombeus J.J.Sm.
- Podochilus rhombipetalus J.J.Sm.
- Podochilus rotundipetala Aver. & Vuong
- Podochilus saxatilis Lindl.
- Podochilus scalpelliformis Blume
- Podochilus schistantherus Schltr.
- Podochilus sciuroides Rchb.f.
- Podochilus serpyllifolius (Blume) Lindl.
- Podochilus similis Blume
- Podochilus smithianus Schltr.
- Podochilus spathulatus J.J.Sm.
- Podochilus steinii J.J.Sm.
- Podochilus strictus Ames
- Podochilus sumatranus Schltr.
- Podochilus sumatrensis Ridl.
- Podochilus tenuis (Blume) Lindl.
- Podochilus tmesipteris Schltr.
- Podochilus trichocarpus Schltr.
- Podochilus truncatus J.J.Sm.
- Podochilus warianus Schltr.
- Podochilus warnagalensis Wijew.
