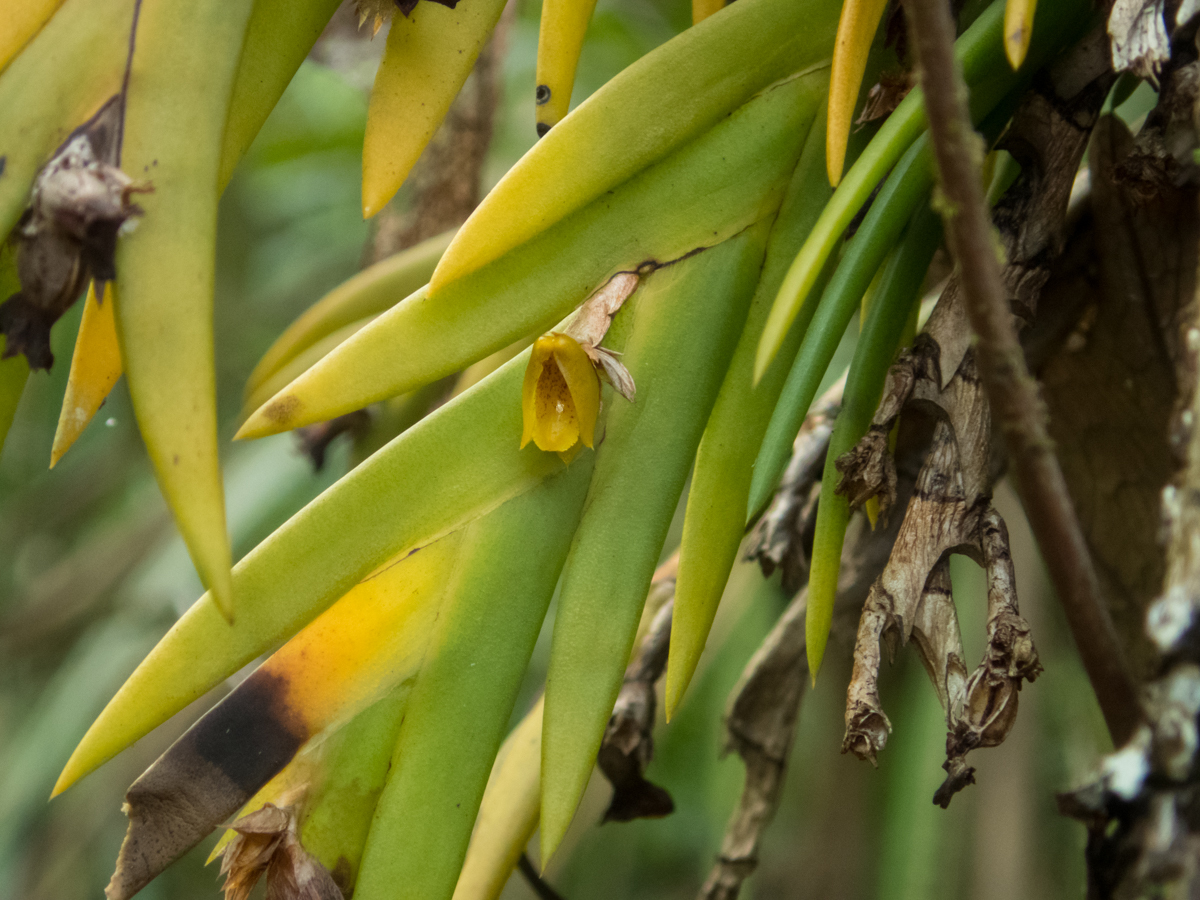
- Oxystophyllum carnosum in Cambodia

Scientific classification
- Kingdom: Plantae
- Clade: Tracheophytes
- Clade: Angiosperms
- Clade: Monocots
- Order: Asparagales
- Family: Orchidaceae
- Subfamily: Epidendroideae
- Tribe: Podochileae
- Genus: Oxystophyllum; Blume

Species
- See text
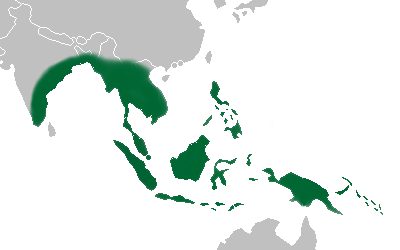

= Oxystophyllum =

Genus of plants

Oxystophyllum is a genus of flowering plant in the family Orchidaceae, native from Indo-China and Hainan to Papuasia. The genus was established by Carl Ludwig Blume in 1825.

== Species ==
As of November 2024, Plants of the World Online accepted the following species:

| Image | Name | Distribution | Elevation (m) |
|---|---|---|---|
| | Oxystophyllum acianthum (Schltr.) M.A.Clem. | New Guinea | 0–350 metres (0–1,148 ft) |
| | Oxystophyllum ambotiense (J.J.Sm.) M.A.Clem. | Moluccas Islands | |
| | Oxystophyllum araneum (J.J.Sm.) M.A.Clem. | New Guinea | |
| | Oxystophyllum atropurpureum Blume | Myanmar, Malaysia, Java, the Moluccas, Sulawesi and New Guinea | |
| | Oxystophyllum atrorubens (Ridl.) M.A.Clem. | Borneo and Malaysia | 0–1,500 metres (0–4,921 ft) |
| | Oxystophyllum bipulvinatum (J.J.Sm.) M.A.Clem. | Papua (Nabire Regency) | |
| | Oxystophyllum buruense (J.J.Sm.) M.A.Clem. | Maluku (Buru), New Guinea | |
| | Oxystophyllum carnosum Blume | Borneo, Cambodia, Jawa, Malaya, Myanmar, Sumatera, Thailand, Vietnam, Laos | 0–1,200 metres (0–3,937 ft) |
| | Oxystophyllum changjiangense (S.J.Cheng & C.Z.Tang) M.A.Clem. | China (Hainan) | 300–1,000 metres (980–3,280 ft) |
| | Oxystophyllum cultratum (Schltr.) M.A.Clem. | Sulawesi and the Philippines | 0–1,000 metres (0–3,281 ft) |
| | Oxystophyllum cuneatipetalum (J.J.Sm.) M.A.Clem. | Sumatera | 650 metres (2,130 ft) |
| | Oxystophyllum deliense (Schltr.) M.A.Clem. | Sumatra | 700 metres (2,300 ft) |
| | Oxystophyllum elmeri (Ames) M.A.Clem. | Philippines | 900 metres (3,000 ft) |
| | Oxystophyllum excavatum Blume | Cambodia, Malaysia, Borneo, Java, Lesser Sunda Islands, Moluccas, Sumatra and New Guinea | 600–1,500 metres (2,000–4,900 ft) |
| | Oxystophyllum floridanum (Guillaumin) M.A.Clem. | Solomon Islands | |
| | Oxystophyllum govidjoae (Schltr.) M.A.Clem. | New Guinea | 1,200 metres (3,900 ft) |
| | Oxystophyllum hagerupii (J.J.Sm.) M.A.Clem. | Sumatra | 0–450 metres (0–1,476 ft) |
| | Oxystophyllum helvolum (J.J.Sm.) M.A.Clem. | Borneo | |
| | Oxystophyllum hypodon (Schltr.) M.A.Clem. | Sulawesi | 140 metres (460 ft) |
| | Oxystophyllum kaudernii (J.J.Sm.) M.A.Clem. | Sulawesi | |
| | Oxystophyllum lepoense (Schltr.) M.A.Clem. | Sulawesi | 1,000 metres (3,300 ft) |
| | Oxystophyllum lockhartioides (Schltr.) M.A.Clem. | Sulawesi | |
| | Oxystophyllum longipecten (J.J.Sm.) M.A.Clem. | Sumatra | |
| | Oxystophyllum minutigibbum (J.J.Sm.) M.A.Clem. | Sumatra | 850–1,700 metres (2,790–5,580 ft) |
| | Oxystophyllum moluccense (J.J.Sm.) M.A.Clem. | Maluku (Ambon) | |
| | Oxystophyllum nitidiflorum (J.J.Sm.) M.A.Clem. | New Guinea | |
| | Oxystophyllum oblongum (Ames & C.Schweinf.) M.A.Clem. | Sabah, Kalimantan and Sarawak | 1,100–1,700 metres (3,600–5,600 ft) |
| | Oxystophyllum oligadenium (Schltr.) M.A.Clem. | Sulawesi | |
| | Oxystophyllum paniferum (J.J.Sm.) M.A.Clem. | Java | 760 metres (2,490 ft) |
| | Oxystophyllum sinuatum (Lindl.) M.A.Clem. | Thailand, Malaysia, Sumatra | 500–1,600 metres (1,600–5,200 ft) |
| | Oxystophyllum speculigerum (Schltr.) M.A.Clem. | Sulawesi | 900 metres (3,000 ft) |
| | Oxystophyllum subsessile (Schltr.) M.A.Clem. | Papua, New Guinea | |
| | Oxystophyllum torricellianum (Kraenzl.) M.A.Clem. | New Guinea | 1,100 metres (3,600 ft) |
| | Oxystophyllum tropidoneuron (Schltr.) M.A.Clem. | Sumatra | 900–1,200 metres (3,000–3,900 ft) |
| | Oxystophyllum tumoriferum (J.J.Sm.) M.A.Clem. | New Guinea, Solomon Islands | |
| | Oxystophyllum validipecten (J.J.Sm.) M.A.Clem. | Sumatra | 1,700 metres (5,600 ft) |
