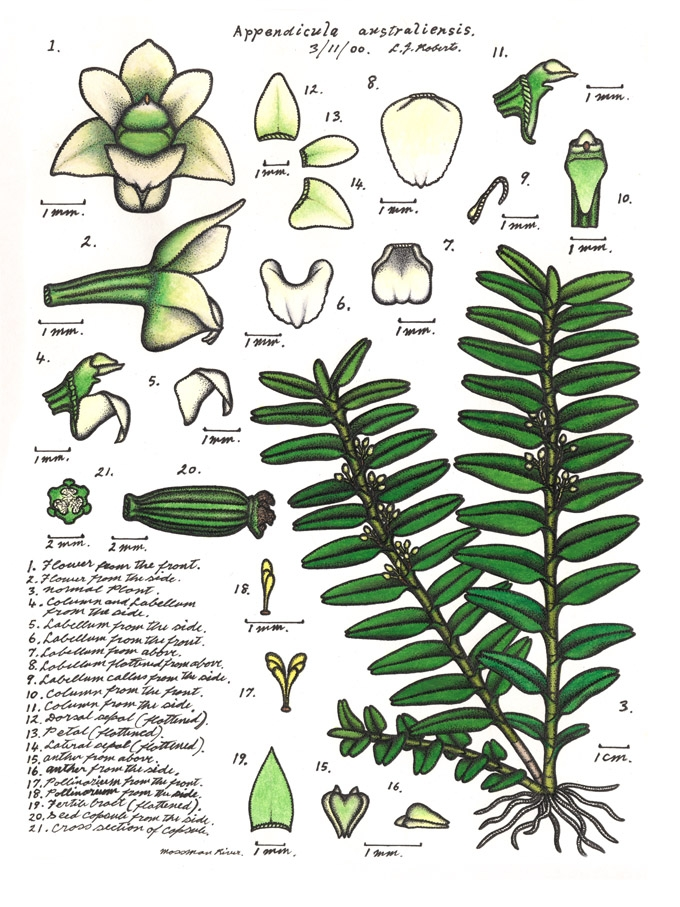
- Illustration by Lewis Roberts

Scientific classification
- Kingdom: Plantae
- Clade: Tracheophytes
- Clade: Angiosperms
- Clade: Monocots
- Order: Asparagales
- Family: Orchidaceae
- Subfamily: Epidendroideae
- Genus: Podochilus
- Species: P. australiensis

Binomial name
- Podochilus australiensis (F.M.Bailey) Schltr.

Synonyms
- Eria australiensis F.M.Bailey; Appendicula australiensis (F.M.Bailey) Schltr.

= Podochilus australiensis =

Native stream orchid

Species of orchid

Podochilus australiensis, commonly known as the native stream orchid, is a species of epiphytic or lithophytic orchid. It has a fern-like appearance with many thin, twisted, glossy green leaves and clusters of up to six dull white or greenish flowers with a green labellum. It grows tropical North Queensland.

== Description ==
Podochilus australiensis is an epiphytic or lithophytic herb with unbranched, slightly flattened stems 200–600 millimetres (7.9–24 in) long and about 3 millimetres (0.12 in) long wide. There are many thin, glossy, dark green leaves 30–45 millimetres (1.2–1.8 in) long and 10–15 millimetres (0.39–0.59 in) wide, giving the plant a fern-like appearance. Between two and six dull white or greenish cream-coloured flowers about 3.5 millimetres (0.14 in) long and wide are borne on short flower stems. The sepals and petals spread widely apart from each other, the dorsal sepal about 2.5 millimetres (0.098 in) long and 1.5 millimetres (0.059 in) wide, the lateral sepals slightly wider and the petals shorter and narrower. The labellum is green, about 2 millimetres (0.079 in) long and 1 millimetre (0.039 in) wide and has a deep spur at its base. Flowering occurs from March to June.

== Taxonomy and naming ==
The native stream orchid was first formally described in 1886 by Frederick Manson Bailey who gave it the name Eria australiensis and published the description in Occasional Papers on the Queensland Flora. In 1907 Rudolf Schlechter changed the name to Podochilus australiensis. The specific epithet (australiensis) refers to Australia, the ending -ensis being a Latin suffix "denoting place", "locality" or "country".

== Distribution and habitat ==
Podochilus australiensis grows in humid forests, often on branches over streams or on rotting logs and boulders. It is found between the McIlwraith Range and the Tully River in Queensland.

== Use in horticulture ==
Easy to grow, but needs water all year round, high humidity, and warmth (not below 10 °C). Can be grown on a slab or in a small pot with a coarse mix.
