= Henry Nicholas Ridley =

English botanist and geologist (1855-1956)

Henry Nicholas Ridley CMG MA FRS FLS FRHS
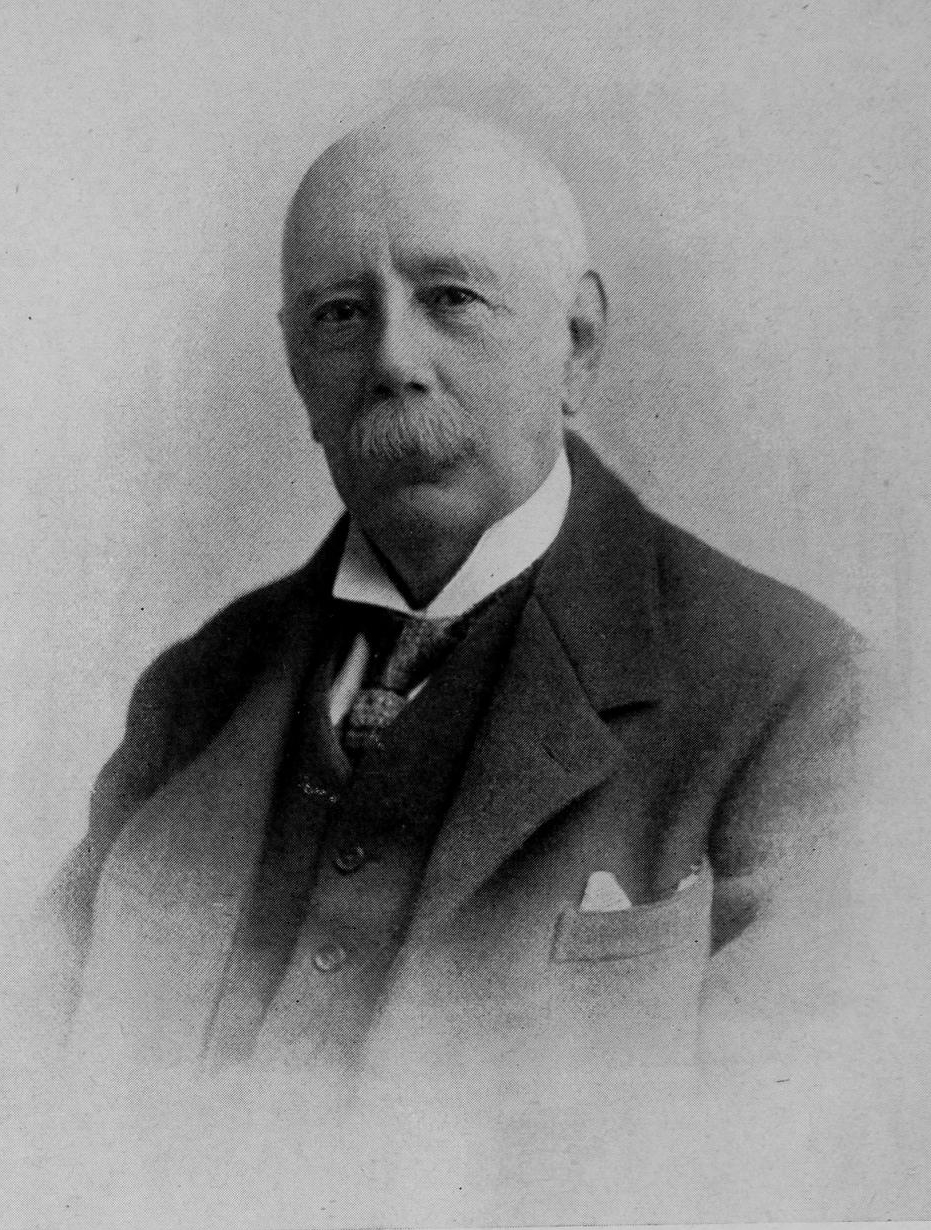
- Born: 10 December 1855; West Harling, Norfolk
- Died: 24 October 1956 (aged 100); Kew, London
- Known for: Rubber industry on the Malay Peninsula
- Awards: Linnean Medal (1950)
- Scientific career
- Fields: Botany
- Workplaces: Singapore Botanic Gardens
- Author abbrev. (botany)

Henry Nicholas Ridley CMG (1911), MA (Oxon), FRS, FLS, F.R.H.S. (10 December 1855 – 24 October 1956) was an English botanist, geologist and naturalist who lived much of his life in Singapore. As Director of the Botanic Gardens in Singapore, he was instrumental in promoting the commercial exploitation of rubber trees in the Malay Peninsula, after devising a method of tapping rubber trees without damaging the bark or destroying the trees. As a result of his ardent attempts to persuade Malayan coffee planters to grow rubber, he became known as ‘Mad’ Ridley.

== Life ==
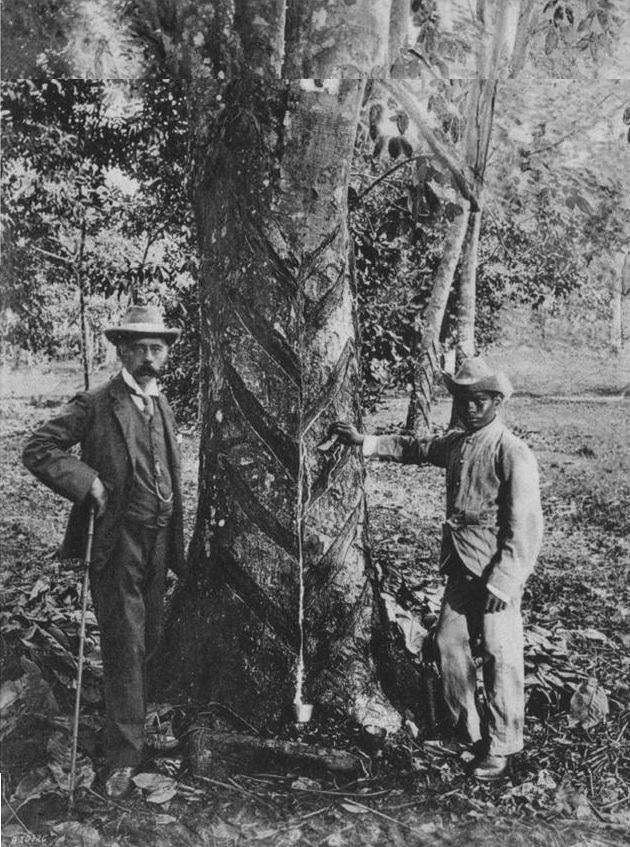
Ridley beside a Hevea with herring-bone pattern bark incisions to tap rubber.

Henry Ridley was the second son and third child born to Louisa Pole Stuart and Oliver Matthew Ridley in West Harling in Norfolk, where his father was the Rector. At the age of three his mother died and his father moved to Cobham in Kent. He studied at Tonbridge School and then went to Haileybury where his brother Stuart also studied. At Cobham, he had taken to the idea of collecting insects and he continued this at Haileybury where the school encouraged him to publish a "List of the Mammals and Coleoptera of Haileybury". The two brothers left Haileybury and Henry went to a private tutor at Medmenham near Henley who encouraged him in Zoology and then went to Exeter College, Oxford where he studied under Edwin Ray Lankester and George Rolleston while also taking an interest in botany and geology under the influence of Marmaduke Lawson and Joseph Prestwich. He graduated in 1878 and received a Burdett-Coutts scholarship that let him conduct research on fossils from quarries near Oxford. He then joined the British Museum in the botany department to replace Henry Trimen who had moved to Ceylon. He specialised in the monocotyledons and also began to travel around Europe. In 1887 he joined the Royal Society expedition with George Ramage to the island of Fernando de Noronha off Brazil, and published on the collections on returning. In 1888 he applied and was selected for the post of director of Gardens and Forests in the Straits Settlements. He was to meet Odoardo Beccari at Florence for information and to meet Trimen at Peradeniya to learn about rubber cultivation along the route.

Reaching Singapore, he was the first scientific director in charge of the botanical gardens and in charge of introducing new plants of economical value. Ridley established the methods for harvesting latex from Pará rubber plants which had been introduced ten years earlier by Sir Hugh Low apart from starting a zoological section in the gardens in 1870. Ridley explored the regions around including Penang and Malacca. In 1894 his post was abolished as the expenditure was found to exceed the revenues obtained. Ridley returned briefly to England but the removal of the post was however objected to by William Turner Thiselton-Dyer and Ridley went back to Selangor to advise on forest reservation.

Ridley spent many years promoting rubber as a commercial product, which he was known for being passionate; therefore, he was nicknamed "Mad Ridley". In 1895, after refining and promoting an improved herring-bone rubber-tapping method that enabled latex to be harvested without seriously damaging the trees. Ridley was also largely responsible for establishing the rubber industry on the Malay Peninsula, where he resided for twenty years. The area under Pará rubber slowly increased after 1898 when a Chinese landowner, Tan Chay Yan, grew 40 acres successfully, leading to more people taking to rubber cultivation.

Ridley was also working on the botany of the region, collecting widely. He then returned to England in 1911 and stayed at Kew to work on a botanical treatise of the region. This five-volume Flora was published from 1922 to 1925. In 1930, he published a seminal and comprehensive work on plant dispersal. This work was the culmination of his own observations over several years, and a review of widely scattered literature on the subject. On his 100th birthday in 1955 he received a visit from the High Commissioner of the soon-to-be independent Malaya.

He married Lily Eliza Doran when he was 83 years old. Ridley died in Kew, short of his 101st birthday on 24 October 1956.

== Publications ==
A near-complete list of publications can be found in the 80th birthday dedication issue of the Gardens' Bulletin (1935). The following are a few selected publications.

- Botanical papers, Singapore: Royal Asiatic Society, Straits Branch, 19 January 1889
- Report on the destruction of coco-nut palms by beetles, Singapore: the Government Printing Office, 1889
- "Notes on the Botany of Fernando Noronha", The Journal of the Linnean Society: 1–80, 1891
- "Malay plant names", Journal of the Straits Branch of the Royal Asiatic Society, 30, Royal Asiatic Society: 32–120 [S.l.], July 1897
- The story of the rubber industry, with an appendix by L. Lewton-Brain, showing the growth of the rubber industry in Malaya from 1905 to 1912, London: Waterlow
- Materials for a flora of the Malayan Peninsula, Singapore: the Methodist Pub. House, 1907
- The Scitamineae of the Philippine Islands, Manila: Bureau of Printing, 1909
- Spices, London: Macmillan, 1912
- Flora of the Malay Peninsula, vol. 1–5, London: L. Reeve & co., 1922–25
- a. b, R. (1930), "The Dispersal of Plants Throughout the World", Nature, 127 (3202), Ashford, Kent: L. Reeve & Co: 399, Bibcode:1931Natur.127..399A, doi:10.1038/127399a0, S2CID 40616285

== Eponymous species ==
Several species are named after Henry Ridley, including Diospyros ridleyi, Stenolepis ridleyi, and Amphisbaena ridleyi. It has been claimed that the olive ridley sea turtle is named after him, but this has been questioned as there is insufficient evidence. It is more likely that the turtle's common name comes from the word "riddle".

In 1913, botanist Rudolf Schlechter published Ridleyella, a monotypic genus of flowering plants from the orchid family, Orchidaceae. The sole species is Ridleyella paniculata, which is endemic to New Guinea.

Then in 1998, botanists A.Weber & B.L.Burtt published Ridleyandra, a genus of about 30 species of flowering plants from Borneo, Malay and Thailand, belonging to the family Gesneriaceae and it also was named in Ridley's honour.
