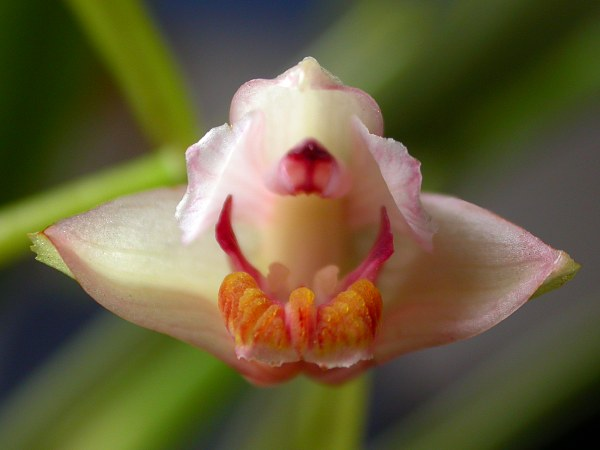

Scientific classification
- Kingdom: Plantae
- Clade: Tracheophytes
- Clade: Angiosperms
- Clade: Monocots
- Order: Asparagales
- Family: Orchidaceae
- Subfamily: Epidendroideae
- Genus: Cryptochilus
- Species: C. roseus

Binomial name
- Cryptochilus roseus (Lindl.) S.C.Chen & J.J.Wood

Synonyms
- Eria rosea Lindl.; Octomeria rosea (Lindl.) Spreng.; Pinalia rosea (Lindl.) Kuntze; Xiphosium roseum (Lindl.) Griff.

= Cryptochilus roseus =

Species of orchid

Cryptochilus roseus is a species of orchid. It is native to Hong Kong and Hainan in southern China.
