= A Revision of the Genus Camellia =

Book by Joseph Robert Sealy

- Author: J. Robert Sealy
- Language: English
- Subject: Plant taxonomy
- Publisher: Royal Horticultural Society
- Publication date: 1958
- Publication place: United Kingdom
- Media type: Print (hardcover)
- Pages: viii + 239

A Revision of the Genus Camellia is a botanical monograph by British botanist Joseph Robert Sealy, published in 1958 by the Royal Horticultural Society in London.

The book was the first comprehensive treatment of the species diversity of Camellia, establishing a classification system with 12 sections and 82 species.

== Chapters ==
The book is divided into 18 chapters, with an index; its structure is shown in the following table:

Chapter	Title	Start page
Frontispiece	Camellia saluenensis Stapf ex Bean	vii
Chapter 1	Introduction	1
Chapter 2	The Taxonomic Position of the Genus Camellia	7
Chapter 3	The Genus Camellia	14
Chapter 4	Geographical Distribution of Camellia	20
Chapter 5	The Interrelationships of the Species in Camellia	27
Chapter 6	Sections Archecamellia and Stereocarpus	36
Chapter 7	Section Theopsis	48
Chapter 8	Section Camelliopsis	97
Chapter 9	Section Piquetia	108
Chapter 10	Section Thea	111
Chapter 11	Section Corallina	132
Chapter 12	Section Calpandria	141
Chapter 13	Section Pseudocamellia	147
Chapter 14	Section Heterogenea	152
Chapter 15	Section Camellia	168
Chapter 16	Section Paracamellia	192
Chapter 17	Doubtful, Imperfectly Known and Excluded Species	211
Chapter 18	Camellias in Western Gardens	227
Index	Index	235

== Taxonomy ==
Before the publication of this book, the classification of Camellia was extremely confused. Carl Linnaeus had placed Camellia japonica and C. sinensis in different genera (Camellia and Thea), and although later scholars such as Pierre and Cohen Stuart made some divisions, a global systematic treatment was lacking. In this book, Sealy, based on morphological characters (especially the morphology and growth habit of pedicels, bracteoles, and sepals), defined Camellia as a natural genus comprising 82 species in 12 sections.

Sealy considered section Archecamellia (represented by golden camellia) to be the basal group of the genus ("base-group"), because it has pedicels, and its bracteoles and sepals are not clearly differentiated and are numerous, which he regarded as primitive characters.

This classification system ended the separation of Thea and other genera from Camellia, rejected small genera such as Camelliastrum and Theopsis established by Takenoshin Nakai and others, and merged the type species of these genera into a broadly circumscribed Camellia.

Later, Chinese scholar Chang Hung-ta in his 1981 work A Taxonomy of the Genus Camellia (Chinese: 《山茶属植物的系统研究》) added subgeneric ranks (four subgenera) on the basis of Sealy and greatly expanded the number of species to more than 280. Ming Tien-lu, in his 2000 monograph Monograph of the Genus Camellia (Chinese: 《世界山茶属的研究》), reduced the number of species to 119, compressed the subgenera to two (subgenus Thea and subgenus Camellia), and revised the sections to 14. Zhao Dongwei, in his 2018 PhD thesis, by adding nuclear gene (RPB2) molecular data for key species from Indochina, revised Sealy's sectional classification and proposed a framework comprising 10 revised sections.

== Reception ==
After publication, the book attracted academic attention. In a 1958 review in Notes from the Royal Botanic Garden Edinburgh, D. M. Henderson praised it as "a splendid book" and "a model of its kind." He noted that Sealy had long been recognized as the botanical authority on Camellia, and that his study covered herbarium material from major herbaria worldwide as well as living plants in Britain and elsewhere, with results that could be called "as authoritative as one could wish for." Henderson especially praised Sealy's own 82 line drawings, considering them "excellent" and more intuitive than textual descriptions in showing morphological differences among species; he also particularly mentioned the color plate of Camellia saluenensis painted by Stella Ross-Craig as "quite beautiful."

In a 1959 review in Current Science, botanist W. Wight praised the book as "fully justifying the labour" (of nineteen years), especially noting its importance to tea plant researchers and affirming the contribution of Ross-Craig's color plates and clear line drawings to taxonomy. Wight considered that Sealy for the first time presented species descriptions of this difficult genus in a convenient and accessible form, and emphasized that the taxonomic affinities given in the book must be consulted for expanding fundamental knowledge of the tea plant. He finally expressed the hope that after the book was welcomed in India, it would lead to the establishment of a national collection of living specimens comparable to the camellia collection at the Huntington Gardens in America.

Japanese botanist Takasi Tuyama in a 1980 paper highly affirmed Sealy's treatment, considering Sealy's merging of all genera split by Nakai to be "generally appropriate." However, Tuyama also criticized Sealy's argumentation as insufficient, believing that because Sealy could not read Japanese literature and relied excessively on herbarium specimens, he failed to directly refute Nakai's grounds for establishing genera based on fine anther morphology (such as the apical projection of the connective and the mode of anther attachment).

A 2004 scientific and technological achievement report by Ming Tien-lu's team at the Kunming Institute of Botany, Chinese Academy of Sciences honored Sealy as the founder who "first systematically revised" the genus, considering that he established a classification system of 12 sections and preliminarily discussed evolutionary relationships. However, the report explicitly pointed out that although Hung-ta Chang's system took a step forward, it had "many problems and errors," and emphasized that the system of "2 subgenera, 14 sections, and 119 species" reconstructed by Ming Tien-lu's team on the basis of Sealy using multidisciplinary integrated methods was more scientific and objective.

Zhao Dongwei in his 2018 PhD thesis also commented that the book "laid the foundation of modern classification," but pointed out that Sealy and others' views were "largely based on specimens from China proper," neglecting key groups from Indochina, which led to insufficient resolution in subsequent molecular phylogenetic trees.

Kuang Xuekun et al. in a 2024 review pointed out that Sealy's system was the "first comprehensive revision" and of milestone significance, but "the classification system did not reflect evolutionary relationships within Camellia."
