= Mrema =

Mrema is a surname. Notable people with the surname include:

- Augustino Mrema (1944–2022), Tanzanian politician
- Elizabeth Mrema (born 1957), Tanzanian environmentalist and lawyer
