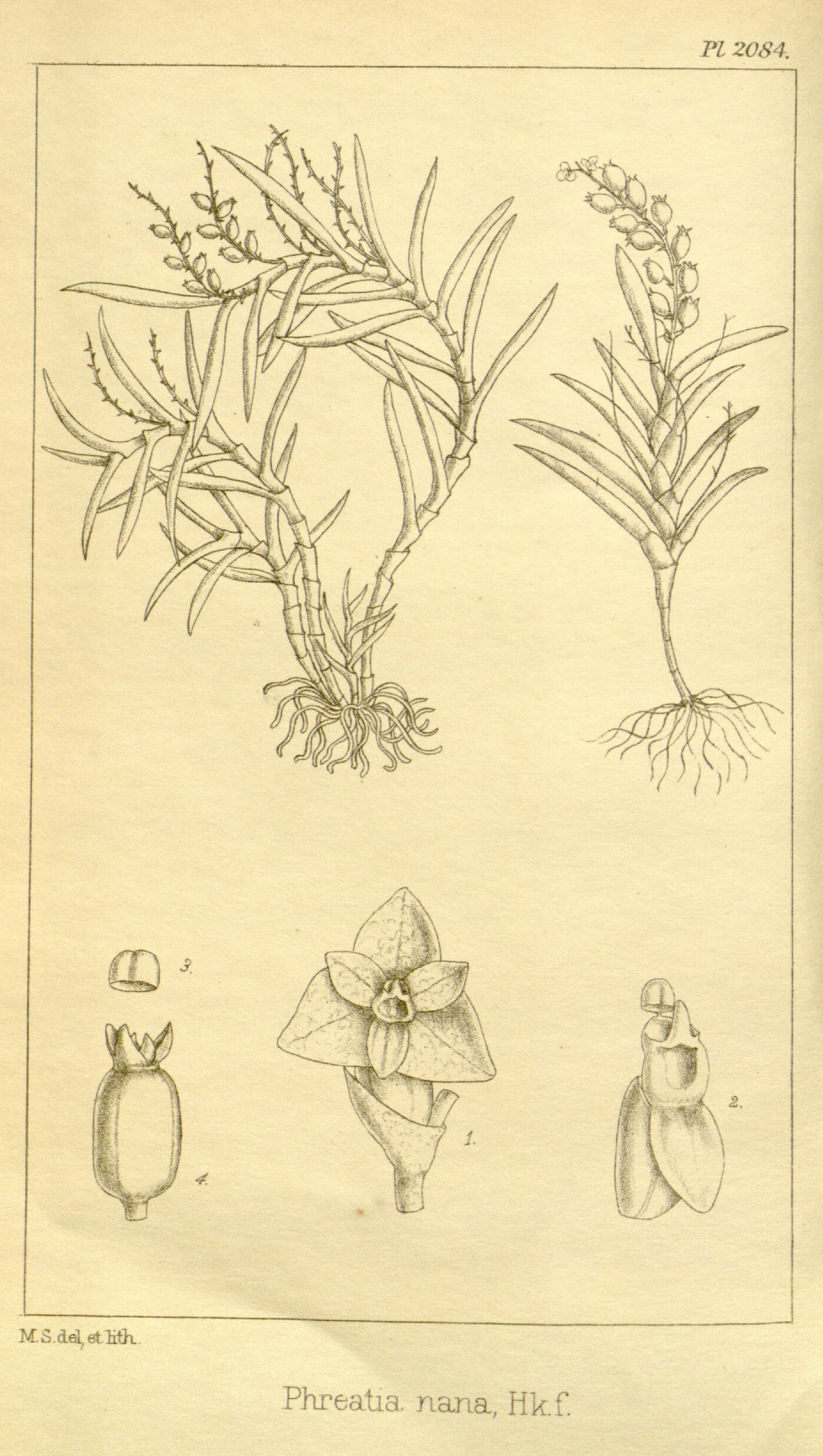
- Illustration of Phreatia nana (now known as Octarrhena parvula) from Hooker's Icones Plantarum

Scientific classification
- Kingdom: Plantae
- Clade: Tracheophytes
- Clade: Angiosperms
- Clade: Monocots
- Order: Asparagales
- Family: Orchidaceae
- Subfamily: Epidendroideae
- Tribe: Podochileae
- Subtribe: Thelasiinae
- Genus: Octarrhena; Thwaites

Type species
- Octarrhena parvula Thwaites

Synonyms
- Chitonanthera Schltr. in K.M.Schumann & C.A.G.Lauterbach; Vonroemeria J.J.Sm.; Kerigomnia P.Royen

= Octarrhena =

Genus of orchids

Octarrhena, commonly known as grub orchids, is a genus of flowering plants from the orchid family, Orchidaceae. Plants in this genus are small, orchids with short stems, thin roots, short, thick, fleshy leaves arranged in two ranks and tiny flowers. The labellum is rigidly attached to the base of the column. There are about fifty species native to areas from Sri Lanka and Malesia to the Western Pacific.

== Description ==
Orchids in the genus Octarrhena are small epiphytic, lithophytic or terrestrial herbs with thin roots and short stems with short, thick, fleshy leaves, their bases sheathing the stem. A large number of tiny, usually white, cream-coloured, yellowish or greenish flowers are arranged on a flowering stem arising from a leaf axil. The sepals and petals are free from each other, the petals usually much smaller than the sepals. The labellum is small, unlobed, rigidly fixed to the column and lacks a spur.

== Taxonomy and naming ==
The genus Octarrhena was first formally described in 1861 by George Henry Kendrick Thwaites who published the description in Enumeratio plantarum Zeylaniae. The name Octarrhena is derived from the Ancient Greek words okto meaning "eight" and arrhen meaning "male" or "masculine", referring the eight free pollinia in the anther.

=== Species list ===
The following is a list of species of Octarrhena recognised by the World Checklist of Selected Plant Families as at January 2019:

- Octarrhena amesiana Schltr.
- Octarrhena angraecoides (Schltr.) Schltr.
- Octarrhena angustifolia (Schltr.) Schuit.
- Octarrhena angustissima (Schltr.) Schuit.
- Octarrhena aporoides (Schltr.) Schuit.
- Octarrhena aristata P.Royen
- Octarrhena bilabrata (P.Royen) W.Kittr.
- Octarrhena brassii (L.O.Williams) Schuit.
- Octarrhena calceiformis (J.J.Sm.) P.Royen
- Octarrhena celebica Schltr.
- Octarrhena cladophylax (Rchb.f.) P.F.Hunt
- Octarrhena cordata P.Royen
- Octarrhena cucullifera J.J.Sm.
- Octarrhena cupulilabra P.Royen
- Octarrhena cylindrica J.J.Sm
- Octarrhena cymbiformis J.J.Sm.
- Octarrhena elmeri (Ames) Ames
- Octarrhena ensifolia (Ames) Schltr.
- Octarrhena exigua Schltr.
- Octarrhena falcifolia (Schltr.) Schuit.
- Octarrhena filiformis (L.O.Williams) P.Royen
  - Octarrhena filiformis var. brachyphylla (L.O.Williams) P.Royen
  - Octarrhena filiformis var. filiformis
  - Octarrhena filiformis var. glabra P.Royen
- Octarrhena firmula Schltr.
- Octarrhena gemmifera Ames
- Octarrhena gibbosa J.J.Sm.
- Octarrhena goliathensis J.J.Sm.
- Octarrhena gracilis (L.O.Williams) Schuit.
- Octarrhena hastipetala J.J.Sm.
- Octarrhena latipetala (J.J.Sm.) Schuit.
- Octarrhena lorentzii J.J.Sm.
- Octarrhena macgregorii (Schltr.) Schltr.
- Octarrhena mendumiana Schuit. & de Vogel
- Octarrhena miniata (Schltr.) Schltr.
- Octarrhena minuscula Aver. & Duy
- Octarrhena oberonioides (Schltr.) Schltr.
- Octarrhena obovata (J.J.Sm.) P.Royen
- Octarrhena parvula Thwaites
- Octarrhena platyrachis P.Royen
- Octarrhena podochiloides (Schltr.) Schuit.
- Octarrhena purpureiocellata P.Royen
- Octarrhena pusilla (F.M.Bailey) Dockrill
- Octarrhena reflexa (J.J.Sm.) Schuit.
- Octarrhena saccolabioides (Schltr.) Schltr.
- Octarrhena salmonea P.Royen
- Octarrhena spathulata (Schltr.) Schuit.
- Octarrhena tenuis (J.J.Sm.) J.J.Sm.
- Octarrhena torricellensis Schltr..
- Octarrhena trigona (J.J.Sm.) P.Royen
- Octarrhena umbellulata Schltr.
- Octarrhena uniflora Schuit. & de Vogel
- Octarrhena vanvuurenii J.J.Sm.
- Octarrhena vitellina (Ridl.) Schltr.
- Octarrhena wariana Schltr.

== Distribution ==
Orchids in the genus Octarrhena are found in Sri Lanka, Vietnam, Borneo, Java, Peninsular Malaysia, the Philippines, Sulawesi, Sumatra, the Bismarck Archipelago, New Guinea, the Solomon Islands, Queensland (Australia), Fiji, New Caledonia, Vanuatu and the Caroline Islands.
