= Plexaure =

Scientific classification
- Kingdom: Plantae
- Clade: Tracheophytes
- Clade: Angiosperms
- Clade: Monocots
- Order: Asparagales
- Family: Orchidaceae
- Subfamily: Epidendroideae
- Tribe: Podochileae
- Subtribe: Thelasiinae
- Genus: Plexaure; Endl.

Synonyms
- Phreatia sect. Plexaure (Endl.) Benth. & Hook.f.

Genus of orchids

Plexaure is a genus of flowering plants in the orchid family, Orchidaceae. It was first formally described in 1833 by Stephan Endlicher with the description published in Prodromus Florae Norfolkicae, and the first species he described (the type species) was Plexaure limenophylax. It is considered a synonym of Phreatia by Plants of the World Online.

== Species list ==
The following is a list of Plexaure species accepted by the Australian Plant Census as at 28 February 2018:

- Plexaure crassiuscula (Nicholls) M.A.Clem. & D.L.Jones (Queensland)
- Plexaure limenophylax Endl. (Norfolk Island)
- Plexaure listeri (Rolfe) M.A.Clem. & D.L.Jones (Christmas Island)
