= Plexaure (disambiguation) =

Plexaure may refer to:

- Plexaure ("twisting breeze") is one of the Nereids in Greek mythology
- Plexaure or Plexaura is also one of the Oceanids in Greek mythology
- Plexaure Endl. a genus of orchids
- Danaus eresimus plexaure is a sub-species of the butterfly Danaus eresimus
