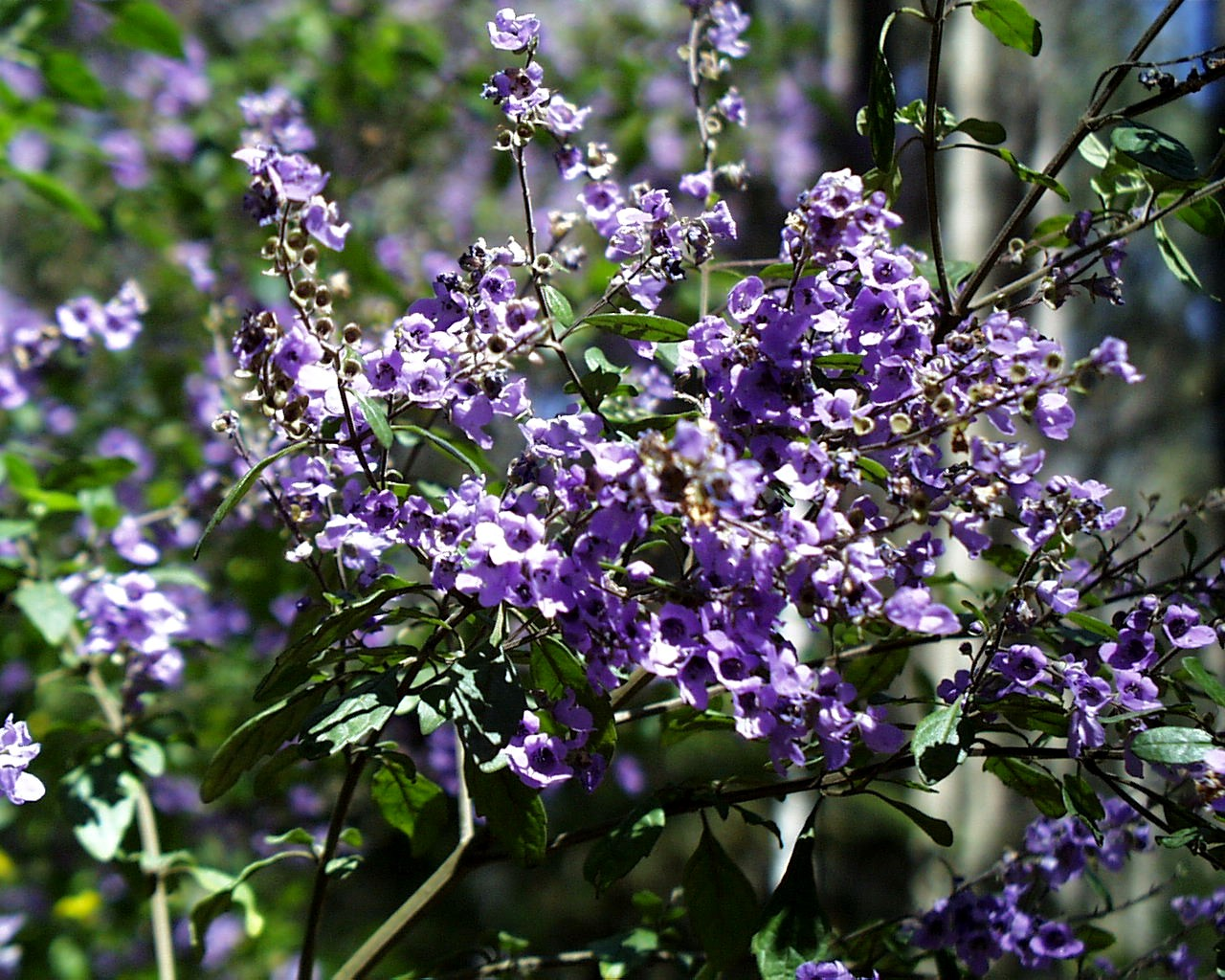

Scientific classification
- Kingdom: Plantae
- Clade: Tracheophytes
- Clade: Angiosperms
- Clade: Eudicots
- Clade: Asterids
- Order: Lamiales
- Family: Lamiaceae
- Genus: Prostanthera
- Species: P. melissifolia

Binomial name
- Prostanthera melissifolia F.Muell.
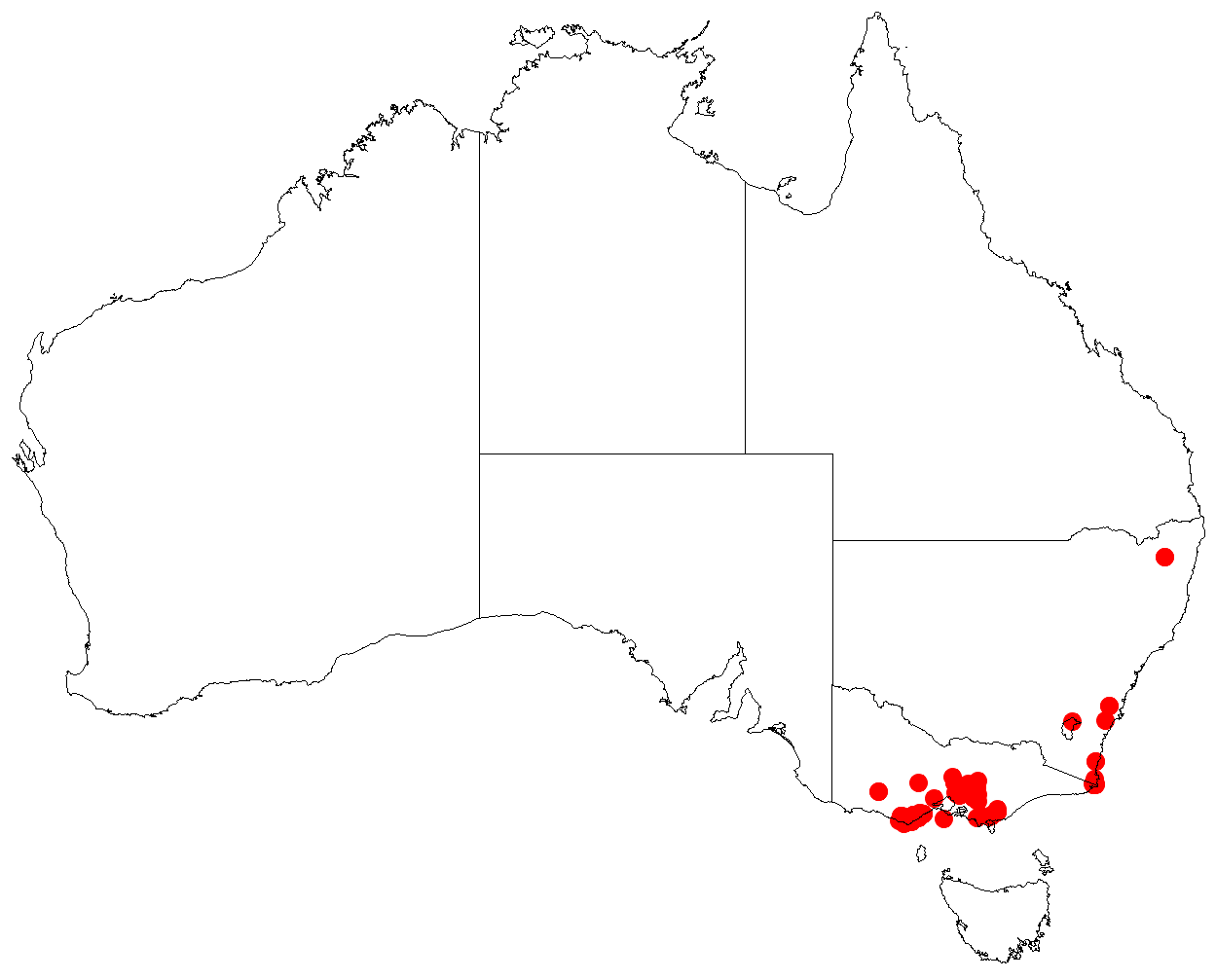
- Occurrence data from AVH

Synonyms
- Prostanthera melissifolia var. melissifolia F.Muell.; Prostanthera melissifolia var. parvifolia Sealy

= Prostanthera melissifolia =

Balm mint bush

Species of flowering plant

Prostanthera melissifolia, commonly known as balm mint bush, is a species of flowering plant in the family Lamiaceae and is endemic to south-eastern Australia. It is an erect shrub with hairy branches, egg-shaped leaves with fine teeth on the edges and mauve to purple or pink flowers on the ends of branchlets.

== Description ==
Prostanthera melissifolia is an erect shrub that typically grows to a height of 1–2 m (3 ft 3 in – 6 ft 7 in) and has hairy, glandular branches. The leaves are dark green above, paler below, egg-shaped, 15–30 mm (0.59–1.18 in) long and 10–15 mm (0.39–0.59 in) wide on a petiole 10–15 mm (0.39–0.59 in) long. There are fine teeth on the edges of the leaves and the midrib and veins are hairy. The flowers are arranged in bunches of ten to twenty on the ends of branchlets with bracteoles 1–2.2 mm (0.039–0.087 in) long at the base but that fall off as the flowers develop. The sepals are green, often with a maroon tinge, and form a tube 2 mm (0.079 in) long with two egg-shaped to oblong lobes 1.5–2.5 mm (0.059–0.098 in) long. The petals are mauve to purple or pink, 10–12 mm (0.39–0.47 in) long and form a bell-shaped tube 5–6 mm (0.20–0.24 in) long with two lips. The central lobe of the lower lip is 5.5–7 mm (0.22–0.28 in) long and 5–6 mm (0.20–0.24 in) wide and the side lobes are 4–6 mm (0.16–0.24 in) long and 5–6 mm (0.20–0.24 in) wide. The upper lip is 3–3.5 mm (0.12–0.14 in) long and 7–8 mm (0.28–0.31 in) wide with a central notch 3–3.5 mm (0.12–0.14 in) deep. Flowering occurs in spring.

== Taxonomy and naming ==
Prostanthera melissifolia was first formally described in 1858 by Ferdinand von Mueller in Fragmenta Phytographiae Australiae. The specific epithet (melissifolia) is in reference to the foliage resembling Melissa, a genus of perennial herbs.

== Distribution and habitat ==
Balm mint bush grows in tall montane forests between the Otway and Strzelecki Ranges in Victoria and on the far south coast of New South Wales.
