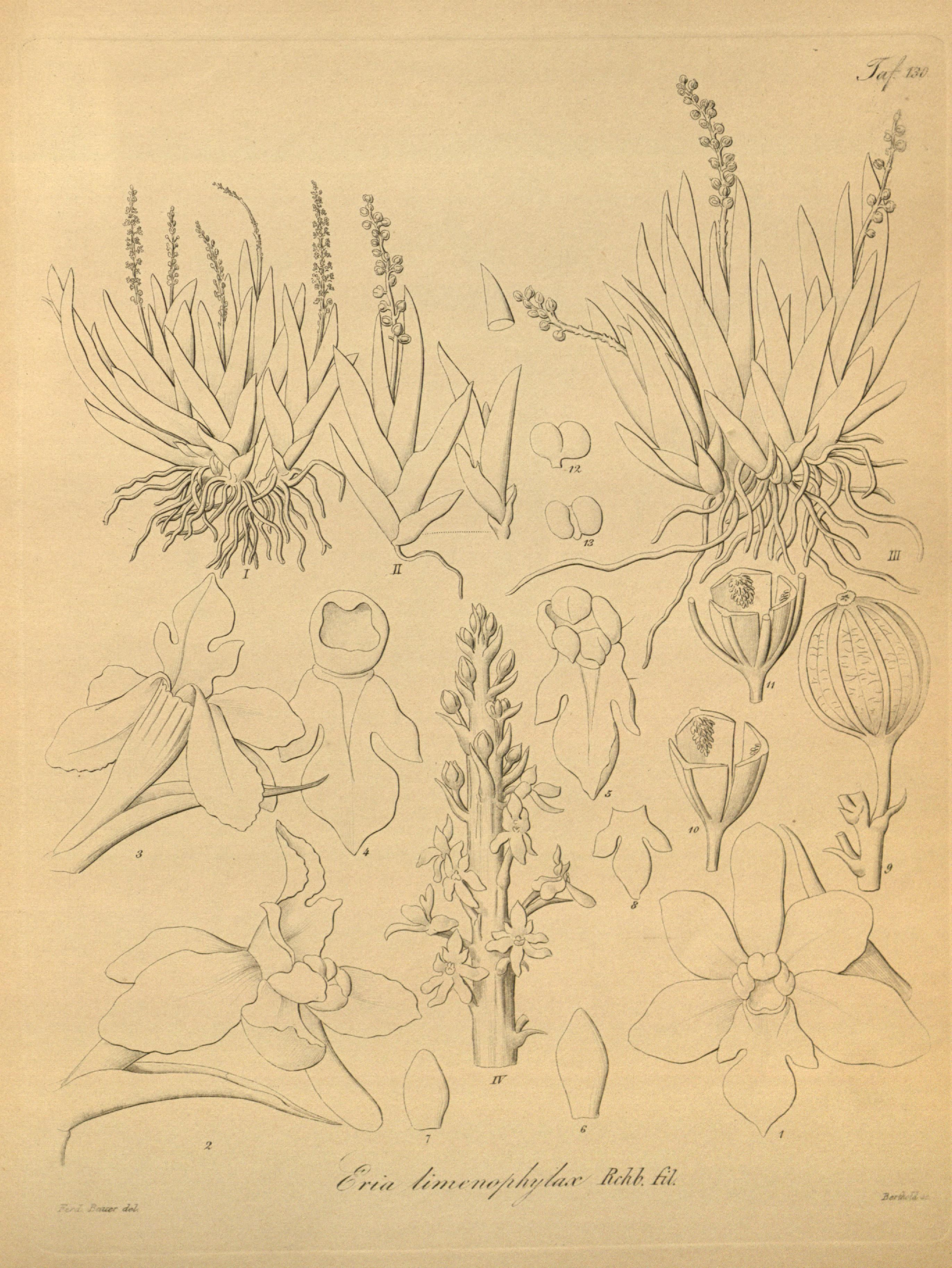
- Phreatia limenophylax

Scientific classification
- Kingdom: Plantae
- Clade: Tracheophytes
- Clade: Angiosperms
- Clade: Monocots
- Order: Asparagales
- Family: Orchidaceae
- Subfamily: Epidendroideae
- Tribe: Podochileae
- Subtribe: Thelasiinae
- Genus: Phreatia; Lindl.

Synonyms
- Plexaure Endl.; Rhipidorchis D.L.Jones & M.A.Clem.

= Phreatia =

Genus of orchids

Phreatia, commonly known as lace orchids, is a genus of flowering plants from the orchid family, Orchidaceae, native to regions bordering the Pacific and Indian Oceans. Plants in this genus are epiphytes, sometimes with pseudobulbs, in which case there are usually one or two leaves. Others lack pseudobulbs but have up to twelve leaves. A large number of small white or greenish flowers are borne on a flowering stem emerging from a leaf axil or from the base of the pseudobulb when present but the flowers do not open widely. There are about 220 species, distributed from tropical and subtropical Asia to the Pacific.

== Description ==
Orchids in the genus Phratia are epiphytic herbs similar to those in the genus Thelasis and sometimes have pseudobulbs with one or two leaves or otherwise lack pseudobulbs and have up to twelve leaves. A large number of small flowers are arranged on a flowering stem that emerges from the top of the pseudobulb when present or from a leaf axil. The flowers are resupinate, usually white or greenish and do not open widely. The sepals and petals are free from and similar to each other, but the petals are slightly smaller. The lateral sepals form a small ledge or "mentum" with the base of the column. There is sometimes a sac-like structure at the base of the labellum.

== Taxonomy and naming ==
The genus Phreatia was first formally described in 1830 by John Lindley and the description was published in his book The Genera and Species of Orchidaceous Plants. The name Phreatia is derived from the Ancient Greek word phreatos meaning "a well" or "reservoir".

=== Species list ===
The following is a list of Phreatia species accepted by the Plants of the World Online as at October 2025:

- Phreatia acuminata J.J.Sm.
- Phreatia albiflora Ridl.
- Phreatia albofarinosa Ormerod
- Phreatia alpina J.J.Sm.
- Phreatia altigena Schltr.
- Phreatia amabilis P.Royen
- Phreatia amesii Kraenzl.
- Phreatia angustifolia Schltr.,
- Phreatia aristulifera Ames
- Phreatia asciiformis J.J.Sm.
- Phreatia beiningiana Schltr.
- Phreatia bicallosa Ridl.
- Phreatia bicostata J.J.Sm.
- Phreatia biechinata Ormerod
- Phreatia bigibbosa J.J.Sm.
- Phreatia bigibbula Kores
- Phreatia bismarckiensis Schltr.
- Phreatia brachyphylla Schltr.
- Phreatia brachyphyton Schltr.
- Phreatia brachystachys Schltr.
- Phreatia bracteata Schltr.
- Phreatia brevicaulis Schltr.
- Phreatia brevis Schltr.
- Phreatia breviscapa J.J.Sm.
- Phreatia bulbophylloides Schltr.
- Phreatia caespitosa J.J.Sm.
- Phreatia canaliculata J.J.Sm.
- Phreatia carolinensis Schltr.
- Phreatia caudata Schltr.
  - Phreatia caudata var. caudata
  - Phreatia caudata var. tenuissima Schltr.
- Phreatia caudiflora Gilli
- Phreatia caulescens Ames
- Phreatia chionantha Schltr.
- Phreatia cladophylax (Rchb.f.) Kraenzl.
- Phreatia coelonychia Schltr.
- Phreatia collina J.J.Sm.
- Phreatia concinna Ridl.
- Phreatia constricta Schltr.
- Phreatia crassifolia Ridl.
- Phreatia crassiuscula Nicholls – green caterpillar orchid
- Phreatia crinonioides Schltr.
- Phreatia cryptostigma Schltr.
- Phreatia cucullata J.J.Sm.
- Phreatia curvata (Gilli) Ormerod
- Phreatia cylindrostachya Schltr.
  - Phreatia cylindrostachya var. cylindrostachya
  - Phreatia cylindrostachya var. grandifolia Schltr.
- Phreatia deltoides J.J.Sm.
- Phreatia dendrochiloides Schltr.
- Phreatia dendrophylax (Rchb.f.) Kraenzl.
- Phreatia densiflora (Blume) Lindl.
  - Phreatia densiflora var. densiflora
  - Phreatia densiflora var. vietnamensis Aver.
- Phreatia densispica Ridl.
- Phreatia densissima J.J.Sm.
- Phreatia dischorensis Schltr.
- Phreatia djamuensis Schltr.
- Phreatia dulcis J.J.Sm.
- Phreatia elegans Lindl.
- Phreatia elongata Schltr.
- Phreatia emarginata (Aver., Vuong & V.C.Nguyen) Ormerod & Vuong
- Phreatia epimonticola J.M.H.Shaw
- Phreatia falcata Ridl.
- Phreatia finisterrae Schltr.
- Phreatia flaccida Ridl.
- Phreatia flavovirens Kores
- Phreatia formosana Rolfe ex Hemsl.
  - Phreatia formosana var. continentalis Aver.
  - Phreatia formosana var. formosana
- Phreatia foveata Carr
- Phreatia ganggapensis P.Royen
- Phreatia gillespiei Kores
- Phreatia giluwensis Ormerod
- Phreatia gladiata (A.Rich.) Lindl.
- Phreatia goliathensis J.J.Sm.
- Phreatia goodspeediana A.D.Hawkes
- Phreatia govidjoae Schltr.
- Phreatia gracilis Schltr.
- Phreatia grandiflora J.J.Sm.
- Phreatia habbemae J.J.Sm.
- Phreatia hartleyi Ormerod
- Phreatia hollandiana J.J.Sm.
- Phreatia hypsorrhynchos Schltr.
- Phreatia imitans Schltr.
- Phreatia infundibuliformis Ames
- Phreatia inversa Schltr.
- Phreatia iridifolia Schltr.
- Phreatia jadunae Schltr.
- Phreatia jayaweerae Ormerod
- Phreatia kaindiensis Ormerod
- Phreatia kanehirae Fukuy.
- Phreatia kaniensis Schltr.
- Phreatia kempfii Schltr.
- Phreatia kempteri Schltr.
- Phreatia keysseri Schltr.
- Phreatia klabatensis Schltr.
- Phreatia klossii Ridl.
- Phreatia koordersii Rolfe
- Phreatia kusaiensis Tuyama
- Phreatia ladronica Tuyama
- Phreatia lalana Ormerod
- Phreatia lasioglossa Schltr.
- Phreatia latipetala J.J.Sm.
- Phreatia laxa Schltr.
  - Phreatia laxa var. laxa
  - Phreatia laxa var. perlaxa Schltr.
- Phreatia laxiflora (Blume) Lindl.
- Phreatia leioglossa Schltr.
- Phreatia leptophylla Schltr.
- Phreatia leucostachya Schltr.
- Phreatia limenophylax (Endl.) Rchb.f. – Norfolk Island caterpillar orchid
- Phreatia lindleyi (Brongn.) Benth. & Hook.f. ex B.D.Jacks.
- Phreatia linearifolia Schltr.
- Phreatia linearis Ridl.
- Phreatia listeri Rolfe – Christmas Island caterpillar orchid
- Phreatia listrophora Ridl.
- Phreatia longibractea Schltr.
- Phreatia longibracteata Ridl.
- Phreatia longicaulis Schltr.
- Phreatia loriae Schltr.
- Phreatia luzoniensis Rolfe ex Ames
- Phreatia macra Schltr.
- Phreatia masarangica Schltr.
- Phreatia matthewsii Rchb.f.
- Phreatia maxima Kraenzl.
- Phreatia mearnsii Ames
- Phreatia mentosa Schltr.
- Phreatia micholitzii Schltr.
- Phreatia micrantha (A.Rich.) Lindl. – native fan orchid
- Phreatia microphyton Schltr.
- Phreatia microscopica (Kraenzl.) Ormerod & Juswara
- Phreatia microtatantha Schltr.
- Phreatia millikenii Ormerod
- Phreatia minahassae Schltr.
- Phreatia minima Schltr.
- Phreatia minuscula (Aver. & Duy) Ormerod & Vuong
- Phreatia modesta Ridl.
- Phreatia moluccana J.J.Sm.
- Phreatia monticola Schltr.
  - Phreatia monticola var. minor Schltr.
  - Phreatia monticola var. monticola
- Phreatia morii Hayata
- Phreatia muscicola P.Royen
- Phreatia myriantha Schltr.
- Phreatia navicularis J.J.Sm.
- Phreatia nebularum Schltr.
- Phreatia negrosiana Ames
- Phreatia nutans J.J.Sm.
- Phreatia oreogena Schltr.
- Phreatia oreophylax Rchb.f.
- Phreatia pacifica Fukuy.
- Phreatia padangensis Schltr.
- Phreatia paleata (Rchb.f.) Rchb.f. – white lace orchid
- Phreatia palmifrons Ormerod
- Phreatia papuana Ridl.
- Phreatia pentagona Kores
- Phreatia perpusilla Aver. & Eskov) Ormerod & Vuong
- Phreatia petiolata Schltr.
  - Phreatia petiolata var. eitapensis Schltr.
  - Phreatia petiolata var. petiolata
- Phreatia pholidotoides Schltr.
- Phreatia phreatioides (J.J.Sm.) L.O.Williams
- Phreatia pisifera J.J.Sm.
- Phreatia plagiopetala Schltr.
- Phreatia plantaginifolia (J.Koenig) Ormerod
- Phreatia platychila (Kraenzl.) Schltr.
- Phreatia platyclinoides Ridl.
- Phreatia pleistantha Schltr.
- Phreatia plexauroides Rchb.f.
- Phreatia polyantha Schltr.
- Phreatia potamophila Schltr.
- Phreatia procera Ridl.
- Phreatia protensa Schltr.
- Phreatia pseudothompsonii Tuyama
- Phreatia pulchella Ridl.
- Phreatia pumilio Schltr.
- Phreatia pusilla (Blume) Lindl.
- Phreatia quadrata Schltr.
- Phreatia quinquelobulata J.J.Sm.
- Phreatia ramosii Ames
- Phreatia renilabris J.J.Sm.
- Phreatia repens J.J.Sm.
- Phreatia resiana J.J.Sm.
- Phreatia rhomboglossa Schltr.
- Phreatia rotundata J.J.Sm.
- Phreatia rupestris J.J.Sm.
- Phreatia ryozoana Tuyama
- Phreatia saccifera Schltr.
- Phreatia sarasinorum Kraenzl.
- Phreatia sarawaketensis Ormerod
- Phreatia scandens J.J.Sm.
- Phreatia scaphioglossa Schltr.
- Phreatia schoenorchis J.J.Sm.
- Phreatia seleniglossa Schltr.
- Phreatia semiorbicularis J.J.Sm.
  - Phreatia semiorbicularis var. angiensis J.J.Sm.
  - Phreatia semiorbicularis var. semiorbicularis
  - Phreatia semiorbicularis var. seramica J.J.Sm.
- Phreatia seranica J.J.Sm.
- Phreatia similis Schltr.
- Phreatia simplex Schltr.
- Phreatia sinadjiensis J.J.Sm.
- Phreatia sororia Schltr.
  - Phreatia sororia var. kenejiana Schltr.
  - Phreatia sororia var. litoralis] Schltr.
  - Phreatia sororia var. sororia
- Phreatia spathilabia Schltr.
- Phreatia spathulata J.J.Sm.
- Phreatia stenophylla Schltr.
- Phreatia stenostachya (Rchb.f.) Kraenzl.
- Phreatia stipulata Schltr.
- Phreatia stresemannii J.J.Sm.
- Phreatia subalpina P.Royen
- Phreatia subcrenulata Schltr.
- Phreatia sublata N.Hallé
- Phreatia subsaccata J.J.Sm.
- Phreatia subsacculata Schltr.
- Phreatia subtriloba Schltr.
- Phreatia sulcata (Blume) J.J.Sm.
- Phreatia sumatrana Schltr.
- Phreatia tafana Ormerod
- Phreatia tahitensis Lindl.
- Phreatia taiwaniana Fukuy.
- Phreatia tenuis Schltr.
- Phreatia teretifolia (Gilli) Ormerod
- Phreatia tetrafolia P.O'Byrne
- Phreatia thompsonii Ames
- Phreatia tjibodasana J.J.Sm.
- Phreatia transversiloba Schltr.
- Phreatia trilobulata Schltr.
- Phreatia urostachya Schltr.
- Phreatia vaginata Schltr.
- Phreatia valida Schltr.
- Phreatia vandenbergiae Ormerod
- Phreatia vanimoana Ormerod
- Phreatia vanoverberghii Ames
- Phreatia vanuatensis T.Yukawa
- Phreatia virescens Schltr.
- Phreatia wenzelii Ames
- Phreatia xantholeuca Kraenzl.

== Distribution ==
Orchids in the genus Phreatia are found in China, Taiwan, the Indian subcontinent, the Andaman Islands, Thailand, Vietnam, Borneo, Java, the Lesser Sunda Islands, Peninsular Malaysia, the Maluku Islands, the Philippines, Sulawesi, Sumatra, Christmas Island, the Bismarck Archipelago, New Guinea, the Solomon Islands, Norfolk Island, Queensland (Australia), Fiji, Niue, New Caledonia, Samoa, the Santa Cruz Islands, Tonga, Vanuatu, Wallis and Futuna Islands, the Society Islands, the Caroline Islands and the Mariana Islands.
