= Phreatia micrantha =

Native fan orchid

Scientific classification
- Kingdom: Plantae
- Clade: Tracheophytes
- Clade: Angiosperms
- Clade: Monocots
- Order: Asparagales
- Family: Orchidaceae
- Subfamily: Epidendroideae
- Genus: Phreatia
- Species: P. micrantha

Binomial name
- Phreatia micrantha (A.Rich.) Lindl.

Synonyms
- List: Eria richardiana Rchb.f.; Oberonia micrantha A.Rich.; Phreatia richardiana (Rchb.f.) Kraenzl. nom. superfl.; Rhipidorchis micrantha (A.Rich.) D.L.Jones & M.A.Clem.; Rhynchophreatia micrantha (A.Rich.) N.Hallé; Eria sphaerocarpa Rchb.f.; Oberonia papuana F.M.Bailey; Phreatia clivicola W.Kittr.; Phreatia collina Schltr. nom. illeg.; Phreatia collina var. linearis Schltr.; Phreatia graeffei Kraenzl.; Phreatia louisiadum Kraenzl.; Phreatia macrophylla Schltr.; Phreatia macrophylloides Kraenzl.; Phreatia moluccana J.J.Sm.; Phreatia robusta R.S.Rogers; Phreatia samoensis (Kraenzl.) Schltr.; Phreatia sarcothece Schltr.; Thelasis samoensis Kraenzl.

Species of orchid

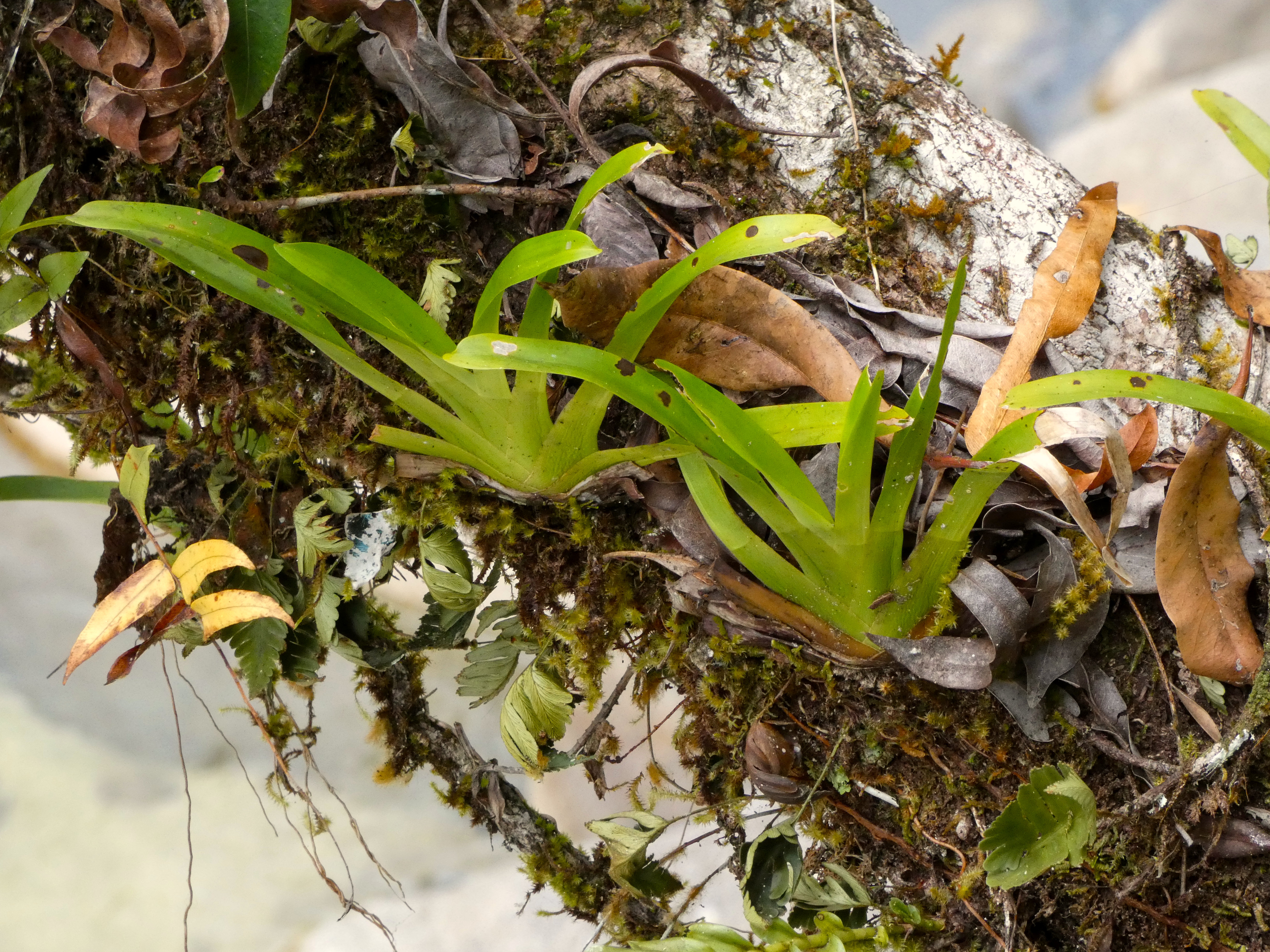
Phreatia micrantha in Daintree National Park, Queensland, Australia

Phreatia micrantha, commonly known as native fan orchid, is a plant in the orchid family and is an epiphyte or lithophyte with four to ten channelled leaves in a fan-like arrangement with their bases sheathing the stem. A large number of small white, cup-shaped flowers are arranged along a thin, wiry flowering stem. This orchid is native to areas between Papuasia and the western Pacific.

== Description ==
Phreatia micrantha is an epiphytic or lithophytic herb with a stem that gradually increases in length with between four and ten leaves in two ranks, the leaves 100–350 mm (3.9–14 in) long and 20–25 mm (0.79–0.98 in) wide in a fan-like arrangement sheathing the stem. A large number of white, cup-shaped, resupinate flowers 2–2.5 mm (0.079–0.098 in) long and wide are arranged along a thin, wiry flowering stem 200–450 mm (7.9–18 in) long. The sepals are about 1.5 mm (0.059 in) long and 1–1.5 mm (0.039–0.059 in) wide the petals slightly shorter and narrower. The labellum is about 1.2 mm (0.047 in) long and wide and turned downwards. Flowering occurs between October and February.

== Taxonomy and naming ==
Native fan orchid was first formally described in 1834 by Achille Richard who gave it the name Oberonia micrantha and published the description in Voyage de la corvette l'Astrolabe: exécuté par ordre du roi, pendant les années 1826-1827-1828-1829. In 1859 John Lindley changed the name to Phreatia micrantha. The specific epithet (micrantha) is derived from the Ancient Greek words mikros meaning "small" or "little" and anthos meaning "flower".

== Distribution and habitat ==
Phreatia micrantha usually grows on rainforest trees sometimes on rocks. It is most common on mossy branches over streams. It is found on the Bismarck Archipelago, New Guinea, the Solomon Islands, Queensland (Australia), Fiji, Niue, New Caledonia, Samoa, Santa Cruz Island, Tonga, Vanuatu, the Wallis and Futuna Islands and the Mariana Islands. In Queensland it occurs between the Iron Range and Tully River on the Cape York Peninsula.
