= Phreatia paleata =

White lace orchid

Conservation status
- Endangered (EPBC Act)

Scientific classification
- Kingdom: Plantae
- Clade: Tracheophytes
- Clade: Angiosperms
- Clade: Monocots
- Order: Asparagales
- Family: Orchidaceae
- Subfamily: Epidendroideae
- Genus: Phreatia
- Species: P. paleata

Binomial name
- Phreatia paleata (Rchb.f.) Rchb.f. ex Kraenzl.

Synonyms
- Eria paleata Rchb.f.; Phreatia obtusa Schltr.; Phreatia pholidotoides Kraenzl. nom. illeg.

Species of orchid

Phreatia paleata, commonly known as the white lace orchid, is a plant in the orchid family and is an epiphyte with more or less spherical pseudobulbs, each with one or two leathery leaves. A large number of white flowers are arranged along a drooping flowering stem. It is native to areas between Sulawesi and the southwest Pacific.

== Description ==
Phreatia paleata is an epiphytic herb with a very short rhizome, threadlike roots and more or less spherical pseudobulbs 10–20 mm (0.39–0.79 in) long and 5–10 mm (0.20–0.39 in) wide. Each pseudobulb has one or two strap-like leaves 10–250 mm (0.39–9.8 in) long and 10–20 mm (0.39–0.79 in) wide. A large number of white, non-resupinate flowers about 4 mm (0.16 in) long and 3 mm (0.12 in) wide are arranged along a drooping flowering stem 150–350 mm (5.9–14 in) long. The sepals and petals are elliptic to egg-shaped and spread widely apart from each other. The dorsal sepal is about 2 mm (0.079 in) long and 1.9 mm (0.075 in) wide, the lateral sepals slightly narrower and the petals shorter and only about 0.5 mm (0.020 in) wide. The labellum is about 2.0 mm (0.079 in) long and wide with pimply edges and a triangular tip. Flowering occurs between January and April.

== Taxonomy and naming ==
The white lace orchid was first formally described in 1877 by Heinrich Gustav Reichenbach who gave it the name Eria paleata and published the description in the journal Linnaea. In that journal Reichenbach had suggested the name Phreatia paleata and in 1911 Friedrich Wilhelm Ludwig Kraenzlin formalised the name. The specific epithet (paleata) is derived from the Latin word palea meaning "chaff".

== Distribution and habitat ==
Phreatia paleata usually grows on rainforest trees in Sulawesi, the Bismarck Archipelago, New Guinea, the Solomon Islands, Norfolk Island, Fiji, New Caledonia, Samoa and Vanuatu.

== Conservation status ==
This orchid is classed as "endangered" on Norfolk Island under the Australian Government Environment Protection and Biodiversity Conservation Act 1999. The main threats to the species are its small population size and changes to the hydrology of the forest where it grows.
