= Phreatia listeri =

Scientific classification
- Kingdom: Plantae
- Clade: Tracheophytes
- Clade: Angiosperms
- Clade: Monocots
- Order: Asparagales
- Family: Orchidaceae
- Subfamily: Epidendroideae
- Genus: Phreatia
- Species: P. listeri

Binomial name
- Phreatia listeri Rolfe

Synonyms
- Plexaure listeri (Rolfe) M.A.Clem. & D.L.Jones

Species of orchid

Phreatia listeri, commonly known as Christmas Island caterpillar orchid, is a plant in the orchid family (Orchidaceae) endemic to Christmas Island, an external territory of Australia. It is an epiphyte, with four to six flat, blunt leaves in a fan-like arrangement and a large number of tiny, greenish white flowers arranged along a thin flowering stem.

== Description ==
Phreatia listeri is a clump-forming epiphytic herb with a short stem, thin roots and between four and six flat, blunt, dark green leaves 40–110 mm (1.6–4.3 in) long and about 2–5 mm (0.079–0.20 in) wide in a fan-like arrangement. A large number of greenish white non-resupinate flowers 1–1.5 mm (0.039–0.059 in) long and wide are arranged along a thin flowering stem 40–80 mm (1.6–3.1 in) long. The sepals and petals are about 0.8 mm (0.031 in) long and do not spread widely. The labellum is about 1 mm (0.039 in) long and wide. Flowering occurs between September and October.

== Taxonomy and naming ==
Phreatia listeri was first formally described in 1890 by Robert Allen Rolfe, who published the description in the Journal of the Linnean Society, Botany. The specific epithet (listeri) honours Joseph Jackson Lister who, with John Maclear and the officers of H.M.S. Egeria, collected the type specimen.

== Distribution and habitat ==
Phreatia liseri is found only on the Australian external territory of Christmas Island, a wet tropical biome, where it is commonly found on rainforest trees in the central plateau of the island. The species is classed as threatened with a high confidence level under the Angiosperm Extinction Risk Predictions model, but has not been formally assessed as of 2026.
