= Cécile Ndjebet =

Cameroonian environmental activist

President of the African Women's Network for Community Management of Forests

Personal details
- Born: Littoral Region (Cameroon)
- Education: Wageningen Agricultural University
- Occupation: environmental activist
- Awards: 2022 Wangari Maathai Award

Cécile Bibiane Ndjebet is a Cameroonian environmental activist and social forester. She has been devoted to women's rights issues and has been involved in the national, regional and international forestry, REDD+ and climate change processes.

She is recognised internationally for her work in advocacy for women's rights to land and forest resources. For her contribution to conservation and gender equality, she was awarded the 2022 Wangari Maathai Forest Champions Award and the 2025 Kew International Medal.

== Early life and education ==
Ndjebet was born in a rural locality near Edea in the Littoral region of Cameroon, the 9th of 14 children. Her mother was a farmer, and Ndjebet was raised with a practical understanding of forestry and rural life. From the age of four, she learned to farm and gather forest products, such as mushrooms, firewood, and medicinal plants.

Ndjebet's formal education in agronomy was driven by a realization of the struggles of women in the region and a desire to advocate for women and improve their lives. She holds an agronomy degree from a university in Cameroon, studied at the University of Wolverhampton in the UK, and earned a Master of Science in Social Forestry from Wageningen Agricultural University in the Netherlands.

Her academic background integrates ecological science, gender studies, and rural development, bridging the gap between environmental policy and women empowerment. She is a PhD candidate at the Central Africa Catholic University, where her research focuses on "Gender relations, access to land and socio-economic situation of women in the Cameroon rural coast".

== Career ==
Ndjebet started her career in Cameroon as a civil servant in 1986. In 1997, she joined civil society organizations.

She founded Cameroon Ecology in 2001, which has restored 600 hectares of degraded land and mangrove forests under her stewardship.

In 2009, to promote women's direct and effective participation in natural resources management in Africa, Ndjebet, together with a group of African women's rights advocates, founded the African Women's Network for Community Management of Forests (REFACOF).

In 2012, she was elected Climate Change Champion of the Central African Commission on Forests. Ndjebet is the national coordinator of the CSO Platform for REDD+ & CC and regional coordinator of the Central Africa CSO Platform for REDD + & CC.

In May 2021, she was selected as an advisory board member of the UN Decade on Ecosystems Restoration, 2020–2030.

Ndjebet is also a member of the advisory board of the UN Decade on Ecosystem Restoration, a global push to revive degraded landscapes. She is the president of REFACOF, an organization promoting women's participation in natural resources management.

The United Nations Environment Programme (UNEP) has named Ndjebet a Champion of the Earth for Inspiration and Action, one of the United Nations' highest environmental honours. Her vision has resulted in a project by Cameroon Ecology to train women to revive more than 1,000 hectares of forest by 2030.

== Vision and impact ==
Growing up in a remote part of Cameroon, Ndjebet was aware of the hardships endured by rural women. She observed her mother and others laboring from dawn to dusk- growing crops, tending to animals, and raising children- often performing back-breaking work on land they could not own due to their gender.

Ndjebet is an agronomist and social forester, as well as a gender specialist and women's leadership trainer and adviser. Her role as a social forester is to link the interaction of people and forests in a positive way. Women work the land for food crops but do not own it. However, planting trees provides ownership, so she worked to convince men to allow women to plant trees, and thus take ownership of, for example, non-productive, degraded land. Ndjebet was inspired to plant trees after meeting Wangari Maathai in 2009.

She would go on to become a leading voice for women's land rights in Africa, spending three decades advocating for gender equality while also repairing hundreds of hectares of nature marred by development.

Ndjebet works to preserve forests and improve the lives of people that depend on them in Cameroon and the wider African region. She was presented with the Kew Medal at the Royal Society, saying: "My vision is a world where we are successful at halting temperature increase and living in harmony with nature. Here, women and Indigenous Peoples take their rightful seat at the table to take action, and youth are taken seriously."

== Awards ==
- 2022 : Wangari Maathai Forest Champions Award
- 2022 : United Nations Champion of the Earth for Inspiration and Action
- 2023: Gulbenkian Prize
- 2025: Kew International Medal awarded for globally recognized work adding to knowledge and understanding of plants and fungi, for championing women's rights in forest management.
