= Octarrhena pusilla =

Wispy grub orchid

Scientific classification
- Kingdom: Plantae
- Clade: Tracheophytes
- Clade: Angiosperms
- Clade: Monocots
- Order: Asparagales
- Family: Orchidaceae
- Subfamily: Epidendroideae
- Genus: Octarrhena
- Species: O. pusilla

Binomial name
- Octarrhena pusilla (F.M.Bailey) M.A.Clem. & D.L.Jones

Synonyms
- Oberonia pusilla F.M.Bailey; Octarrhena pusilla (F.M.Bailey) Dockrill isonym; Phreatia baileyana Schltr.; Phreatia pusilla (F.M.Bailey) Rolfe nom. illeg.

Species of orchid

Octarrhena pusilla, commonly known as the wispy grub orchid, is an epiphytic or lithophytic plant in the orchid family. It has thin roots, usually only a single stem, between three and six fleshy, cylindrical leaves and up to twenty small, white to cream-coloured flowers. This orchid is endemic to tropical North Queensland, Australia.

== Description ==
Octarrhena pusilla is an epiphytic or lithophytic herb usually with a single stem with thin roots. The shoot has between three and six fleshy, cylindrical, green to yellowish green leaves 15–30 mm (0.59–1.2 in) long and 2–2.5 mm (0.079–0.098 in) wide with their bases overlapping. Between five and twenty white to cream-coloured, non-resupinate flowers about 1.5 mm (0.059 in) long and wide are borne on a thread-like flowering stem 20–30 mm (0.79–1.2 in) long. The sepals and petals are egg-shaped, spread widely apart from each other, the sepals about 0.8 mm (0.031 in) long, the petals much smaller than the sepals. The labellum is about 0.5 mm (0.020 in) long and wide with obscure lobes. Flowering occurs between September and November.

== Taxonomy and naming ==
The wispy grub orchid was first formally described in 1889 by Frederick Manson Bailey who gave it the name Oberonia pusilla and published the description in Report of the government scientific expedition to Bellenden-Ker Range: upon the flora and fauna of that part of the Colony. In 1992 Mark Clements and David Jones changed the name to Octarrhena pusilla. The specific epithet (pusilla) is a Latin word meaning "very small", "little" or "petty".

== Distribution and habitat ==
The wispy grub orchid grows on mossy trees and rocks in rainforest between the Cedar Bay and Paluma Range National Parks in Queensland.
