= Kew International Medal =

Science and conservation award

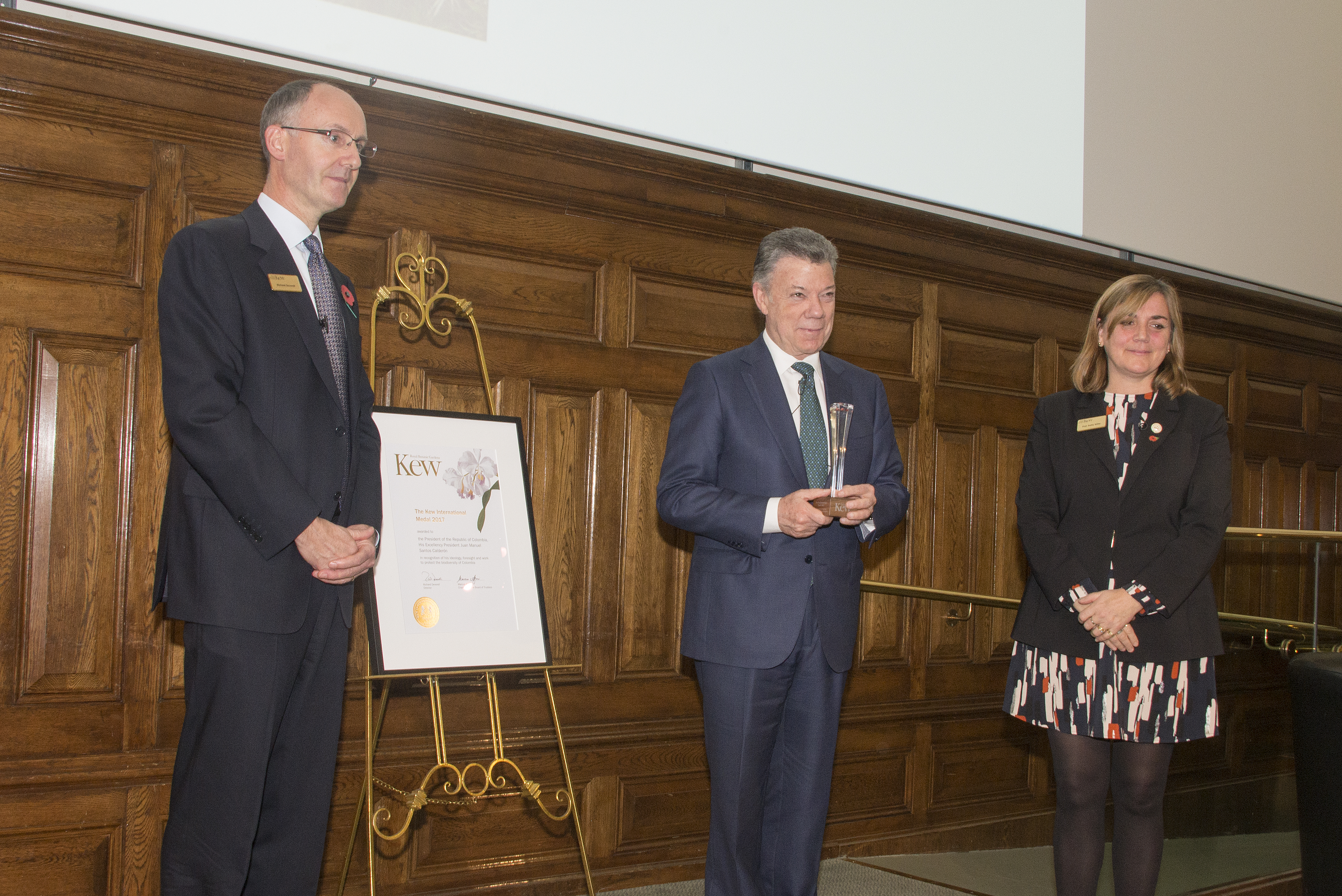
- Kew International Medal awarded to Juan Manuel Santos, President Santos of Colombia in 2017 with Richard Deverell and Kathy Willis
- Awarded for: “significant contributions to science and conservation”
- Sponsored by: Royal Botanic Gardens, Kew
- Location: London
- Website: www.kew.org/read-and-watch/kew-international-medal

The Kew International Medal is an award given to individuals who have made a significant contribution to science and conservation. The award was first established in 1992 by the Board of Trustees of the Royal Botanic Gardens, Kew.

== Laureates ==
Previous award winners include:

- 2025: António Guterres
- 2025: Cécile Ndjebet
- 2023: Suzanne Simard
- 2022: Elizabeth Maruma Mrema
- 2021: Partha Dasgupta
- 2020: Sandra Diaz
- 2018: Mary Robinson
- 2017: Juan Manuel Santos
- 2016: Sebsebe Demissew
- 2015: Kiat Wee Tan
- 2014: E. O. Wilson
- 2012: Jared Diamond
- 2009: Peter H. Raven
- 2003: Mary Grierson
- 2000: Margaret Stones
- 1999: Stella Ross-Craig
- 1996: David Attenborough
- 1994: Robert Sainsbury and Lady Lisa Sainsbury

== Award criteria and nominations ==
The winner is ratified by the Executive Board and Board of Trustees. Nominations are received from across the organisation and a selection panel made up of Kew Trustees and Executive Board Members decides the winner. Criteria the panel benchmark against are:

- Building a world where plants and fungi are understood, valued and conserved – because our lives depend on them
- Providing knowledge, inspiration and understanding of why plants and fungi matter to everyone;
- Helping to solve some of the critical challenges facing humanity including (but not limited to): biodiversity loss, climate change, food security, plant pathogens, fighting disease;
- Increasing public awareness of the threat to plant and fungal diversity.

== See also ==
- List of environmental awards
