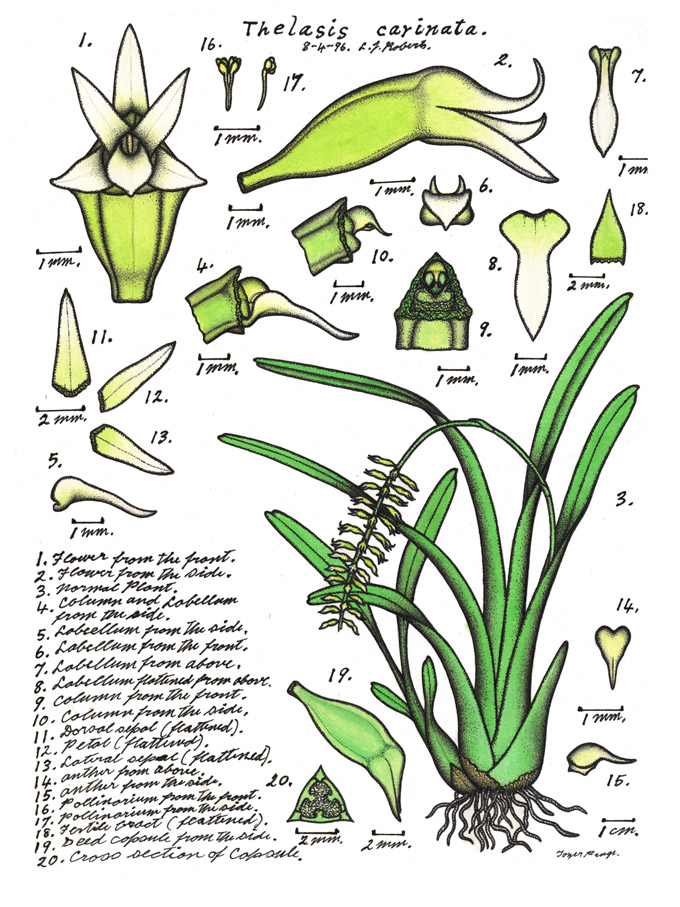
- Thelasis carinata

Scientific classification
- Kingdom: Plantae
- Clade: Tracheophytes
- Clade: Angiosperms
- Clade: Monocots
- Order: Asparagales
- Family: Orchidaceae
- Subfamily: Epidendroideae
- Tribe: Podochileae
- Subtribe: Thelasiinae; Pfitzer Entw. Nat. Anord. Orch.: 104 (1887)

Genera
- Octarrhena; Phreatia; Thelasis

= Thelasiinae =

Subtribe of orchids

Thelasiinae is an orchid subtribe in the tribe Podochileae.

== See also ==
- Taxonomy of the Orchidaceae
