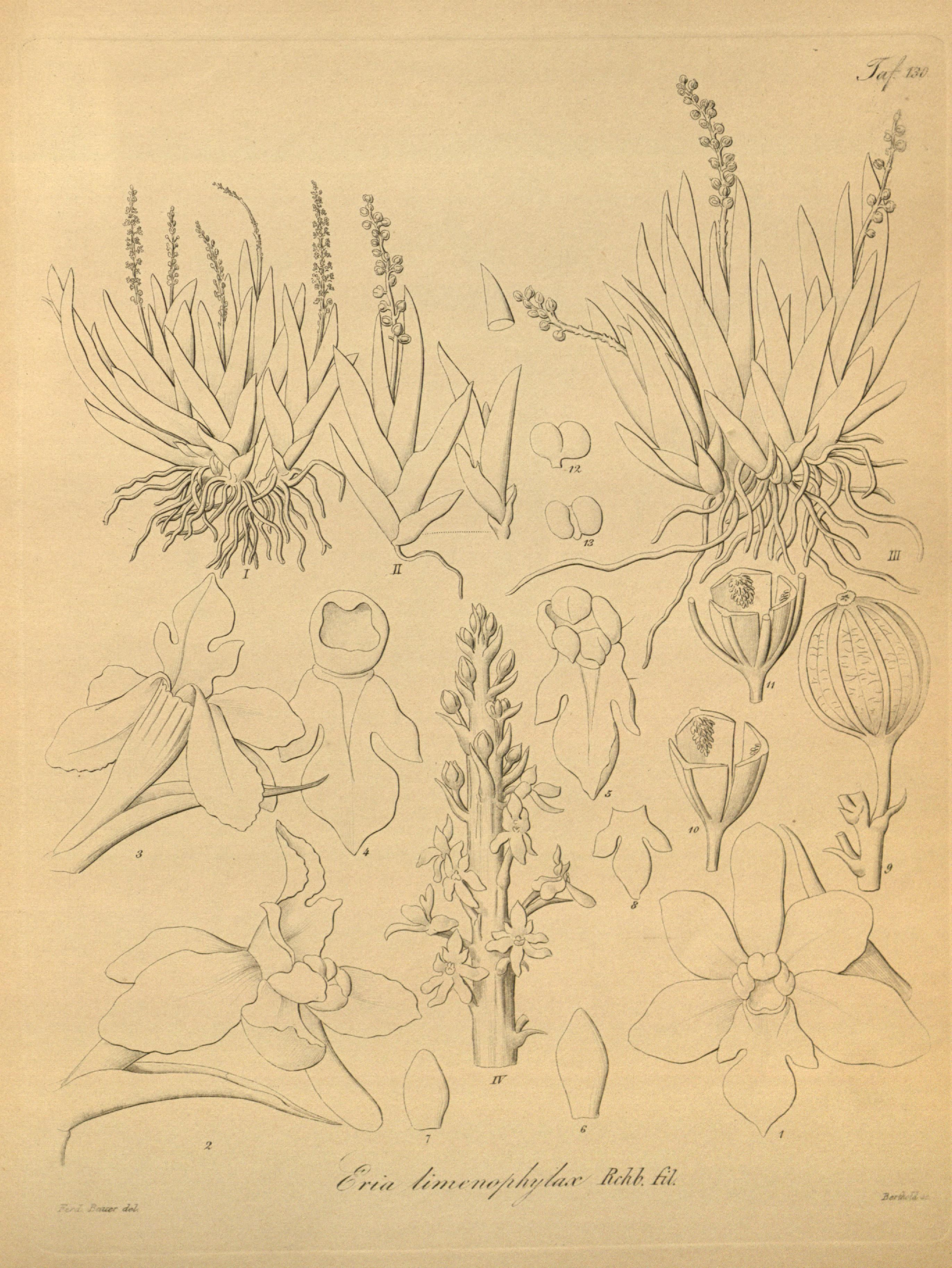
- Illustration from Reichenbach's book Xenia orchidacea

Conservation status
- Critically endangered (EPBC Act)

Scientific classification
- Kingdom: Plantae
- Clade: Tracheophytes
- Clade: Angiosperms
- Clade: Monocots
- Order: Asparagales
- Family: Orchidaceae
- Subfamily: Epidendroideae
- Genus: Phreatia
- Species: P. limenophylax

Binomial name
- Phreatia limenophylax (Endl.) Rchb.f.

Synonyms
- Plexaure limenophylax Endl.; Eria limenophylax (Endl.) Rchb.f.; Pinalia limenophyllax (Endl.) Kuntze; Oberonia lindleyana Brongn. in L.I.Duperrey; Oberonia crassiuscula F.Muell. ex Benth.; Phreatia lindleyana (Brongn.) Benth. & Hook.f. ex B.D.Jacks.; Phreatia pachyphylla Schltr.; Phreatia vitiensis Rolfe; Sarcochilus microphyton Kraenzl.

= Phreatia limenophylax =

Norfolk Island caterpillar orchid

Species of orchid

Phreatia limenophylax, commonly known as the Norfolk Island caterpillar orchid is a plant in the orchid family, an epiphyte with four to six fleshy, channelled leaves in a fan-like arrangement. A large number of tiny white flowers are arranged along a thin flowering stem. It grows on the Solomon Islands, Norfolk Island and other islands of the southwest Pacific Ocean.

== Description ==
Phreatia limenophylax is an epiphytic herb with a short stem, thin roots and between four and six thick, fleshy, dark green channelled leaves 20–60 mm (0.79–2.4 in) long and about 2–4 mm (0.079–0.16 in) wide in a fan-like arrangement. A large number of greenish white non-resupinate flowers about 1 mm (0.039 in) long and wide are arranged along a thin flowering stem 20–30 mm (0.79–1.2 in) long with prominent bracts. The sepals and petals are about 0.5 mm (0.020 in) long. The labellum is about 0.5 mm (0.020 in) long. Flowering occurs between January and April.

== Taxonomy and naming ==
The Norfolk Island caterpillar orchid was first formally described in 1833 by Stephan Endlicher who gave it the name Plexaure limenophylax and published the description in Prodromus Florae Norfolkicae. The type specimen was collected by Ferdinand Bauer near Anson Bay on the western side of Norfolk Island. In 1873 George Bentham changed the name to Phreatia limenophylax. The specific epithet (limenophylax) is derived from the Ancient Greek prefix limeno- meaning "harbour", "haven" or "refuge" and phylax meaning "guard".

== Distribution and habitat ==
Phreatia limenophylax usually grows on rainforest trees. It is found on the Solomon Islands, Norfolk Island, Fiji, New Caledonia, Samoa, Vanuatu and on Wallis and Futuna Islands. On Norfolk Island all five remaining specimens are found in the Mount Pitt section of the Norfolk Island National Park.

== Conservation status ==
This orchid is classified as "critically endangered" under the Australian Government Environment Protection and Biodiversity Conservation Act 1999.
