= Sebsebe Demissew =

Ethiopian botanist (born 1953)

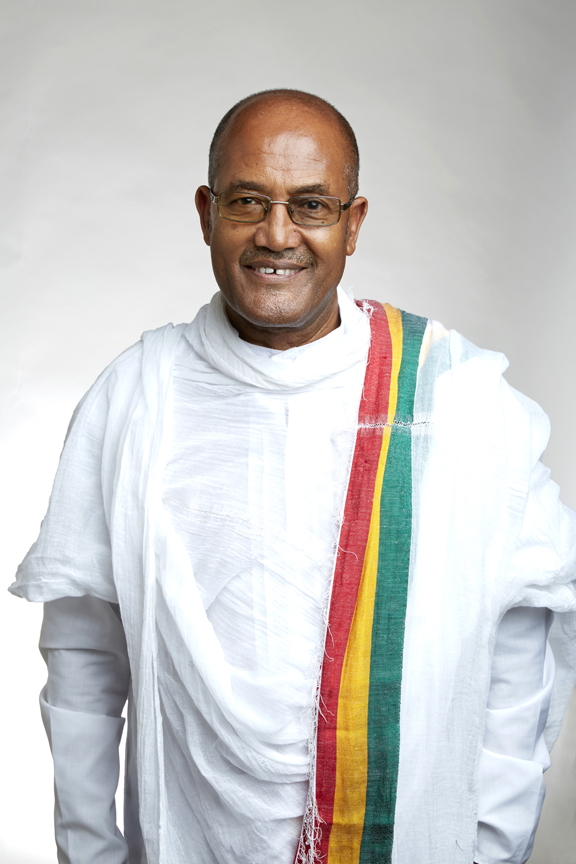
- Demissew in 2018
- Born: June 14, 1953 (age 73)
- Education: Addis Ababa University; University of Uppsala
- Known for: Flora of Ethiopia and Eritrea
- Awards: Kew International Medal (2016); Foreign Member of the Royal Society (2018); Linnean Medal (2022)
- Scientific career
- Fields: Botany; Systematics
- Workplaces: Addis Ababa University
- Thesis: The genus Maytenus (Celastraceae) in NE tropical Africa and tropical Arabia (1985)
- Author abbrev. (botany): Sebsebe

Sebsebe Demissew (born June 14, 1953) is an Ethiopian botanist who is Professor of Plant Systematics and Biodiversity at Addis Ababa University and Executive Director of the Gullele Botanic Garden in Addis Ababa, Ethiopia.

== Education ==
Demissew was educated at Addis Ababa University where he was awarded a Bachelor of Science degree in Biology in 1977 followed by a Master of Science degree in Botany 1980. He completed postgraduate study at Uppsala University in Sweden where he was awarded a PhD in 1985 for research on the botany of the Maytenus genus of plants in tropical Africa and Arabia.

== Career and research ==
Demissew served as the Leader of the Flora of Ethiopia and Eritrea between 1996 until its completion in 2009 in collaboration with Inga Hedberg in which 6000 species with 10% endemic species are documented; the project involved 91 scientists from 17 countries. It is one of the few completed Floras in Africa.

Demissew has participated in a number of successful collaborative research projects with universities in Europe and Africa including Oslo, Norway with Inger Nordal; Copenhagen, Denmark with Ib Friis; Marburg, Germany: the University of Leicester and Royal Botanic Gardens, Kew, UK; National Museums of Kenya, and South African National Botanical Institute in Cape Town & Pretoria, South Africa. These projects have addressed floristics, biosystematics, vegetation, evolution in Afro alpine environments and under-utilized indigenous crops. involving postgraduate students. His research provides training for postgraduate students, consistent with his view that African specialists are needed for research and curation of their own country's plant resources.

Demissew has authored and co-authored books and articles in peer reviewed journals on the vegetation and plants of Ethiopia and Africa. He is a member of national and international professional organizations and has served as Chair of the Biological Society of Ethiopia, Secretary General of the Association for the Taxonomic Study of the Flora Tropical Africa (AETFAT) in addition to being a Council member of International Association for Plant Taxonomy (IAPT). He served as Co-Chair of the Multidisciplinary Expert Panel for the Intergovernmental Science-Policy Platform on Biodiversity and Ecosystem Services (IPBES).

== Awards and honours ==
In 2016, Demissew was awarded the Kew International Medal.

He was elected a Foreign Member of the Royal Society (ForMemRS) in 2018 for "outstanding contributions to research and innovation".

In 2021 Demissew was awarded the Cuatrecasas Medal for Excellence in Tropical Botany by the Smithsonian National Museum of Natural History, USA, for his life's work in conserving and recording the very diverse Ethiopian flora with many endemic species, and leadership of the Ethiopian Flora Project and the National Herbarium. This award is made annually to a scientist who has made a very significant contribution to advancing the field of tropical botany.
