= Thelasis capitata =

Conical fly orchid

Scientific classification
- Kingdom: Plantae
- Clade: Tracheophytes
- Clade: Angiosperms
- Clade: Monocots
- Order: Asparagales
- Family: Orchidaceae
- Subfamily: Epidendroideae
- Genus: Thelasis
- Species: T. capitata

Binomial name
- Thelasis capitata Blume

Synonyms
- Thelasis elongata auct. non Blume: Ridley, H.N. (1906), The botany of Christmas Island.

Species of orchid

Thelasis capitata, commonly known as conical fly orchid, is a plant in the orchid family. It is a clump-forming epiphyte with flattened pseudobulbs, each with a single strap-shaped leaf. A large number of small yellowish green flowers are arranged in a cone shape on a thin but stiff flowering stem. This orchid is found from Thailand to Malesia, including on Christmas Island.

== Description ==
Thelasis capitata is an epiphytic herb with thin roots and flattened pseudobulbs 10–15 mm (0.39–0.59 in) long and wide. Each pseudobulb has a single thick, fleshy, dark green, strap-shaped leaf 50–150 mm (2.0–5.9 in) long and 10–18 mm (0.39–0.71 in) wide. A large number of yellowish green resupinate flowers 3–4 mm (0.12–0.16 in) long and 2.5–3 mm (0.098–0.12 in) wide are arranged in a conical head on the top of a thin but stiff flowering stem 70–180 mm (2.8–7.1 in) long emerging from the base of the pseudobulb. The flowers open one after the other in a spiral sequence, each flower lasting a few days. The dorsal sepal is about 3 mm (0.12 in) long and 1.5 mm (0.059 in) wide, the lateral sepals about 4 mm (0.16 in) long and 2 mm (0.079 in) wide. The petals are shorter and narrower than the dorsal sepal. The labellum is 4–4.5 mm (0.16–0.18 in) long and about 2.5 mm (0.098 in) wide and curves downwards. Flowering occurs between April and June.

== Taxonomy and naming ==
Thelasis capitata was first formally described in 1825 by Carl Ludwig Blume who published the description in Bijdragen tot de flora van Nederlandsch Indië. The specific epithet (capitata) is a Latin word meaning "having a head".

== Distribution and habitat ==
Conical fly orchid usually grows on rainforest trees. It is found in Thailand, Borneo, Java, the Maluku Islands, the Philippines, Sulawesi, Sumatra and Christmas Island.
