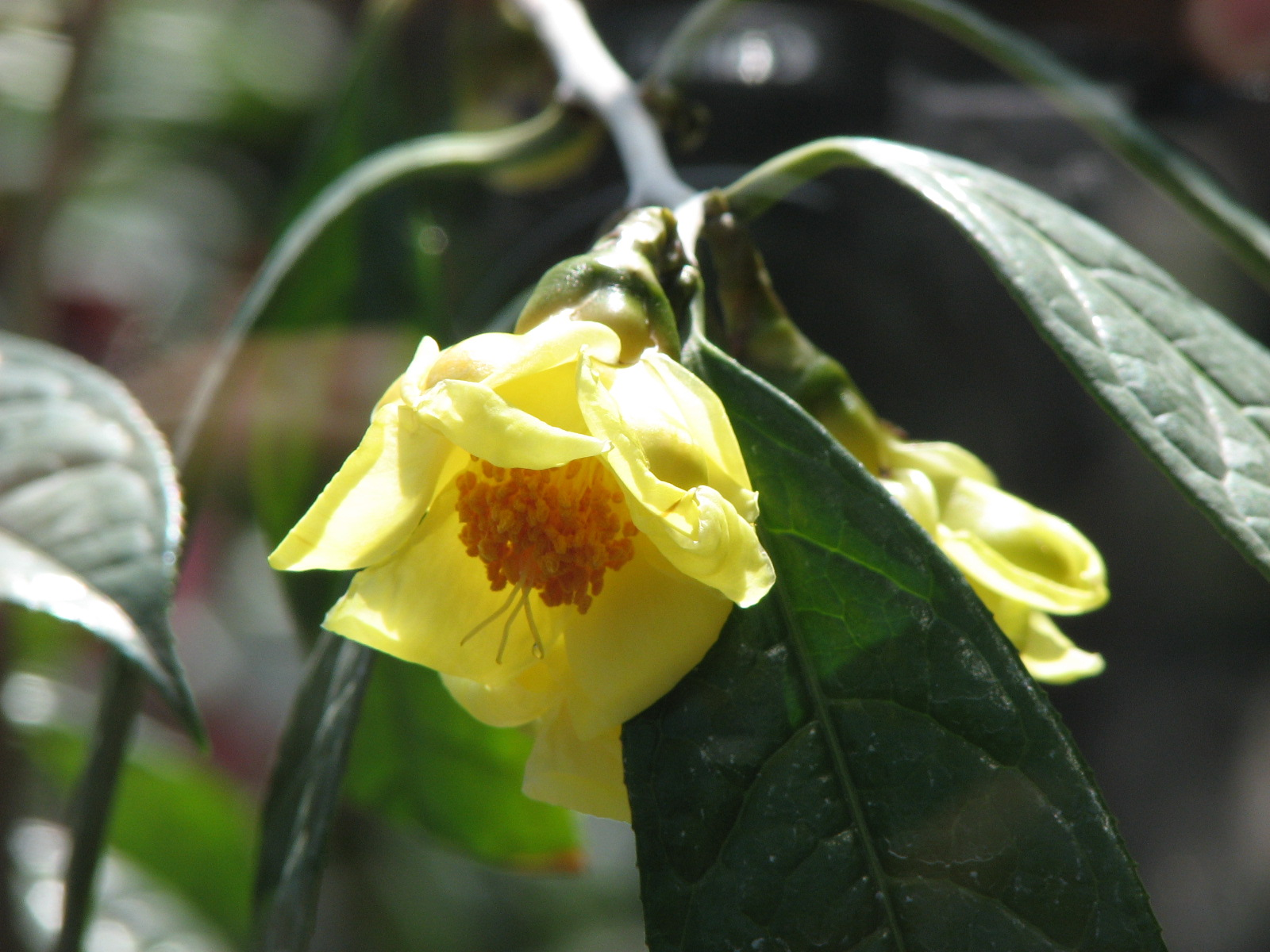

Conservation status
- Endangered (IUCN 3.1)

Scientific classification
- Kingdom: Plantae
- Clade: Tracheophytes
- Clade: Angiosperms
- Clade: Eudicots
- Clade: Asterids
- Order: Ericales
- Family: Theaceae
- Genus: Camellia
- Species: C. petelotii

Binomial name
- Camellia petelotii (Merr.) Sealy

Synonyms
- Camellia achrysantha Hung T.Chang & S.Ye Liang; Camellia chrysantha (Hu) Tuyama; Camellia chrysantha f. longistyla S.L.Mo & Y.C.Zhong; Camellia nitidissima C.W.Chi; Thea petelotii Merr.; Theopsis chrysantha Hu

= Camellia petelotii =

Species of flowering plant

Camellia petelotii is a species of plant in the family Theaceae. It is found in China (endemic in the Guangxi Zhuang Autonomous Region in southern China) and Vietnam. It is known as the golden camellia for its distinctive yellow blossoms. Synonyms include C. chrysantha and Camellia nitidissima. The golden camellia originated 170 million years ago, and is a first-class nationally protected plant in China. The golden camellia is extremely demanding on the growth environment, its genes are extremely difficult to replicate, and, once transplanted, it is known to die or genetically mutate. It is also threatened by habitat loss. Therefore, in 1986, the Golden Camellia National Nature Reserve was built in Fangcheng, Guangxi, with a total area of 9195.1 hectares.

In southern China and Vietnam where the golden camellia originates, it has been used to make tea, and in addition has been propagated as a garden plant for its waxy yellow flowers, which are notably unusual for a member of the Camellia genus. The plant is endangered in the wild, but is widely favored in gardens.

== Description ==
Camellia petelotii is a shrub or small tree growing up to 5 meters in height.

== Uses ==
With Golden Camellias, Chinese experts have been conducting experiments to create new varieties of the flower. Experts have found a few and named them, "Nayue Hongyan", "Liaoyan Beauty", "Xinhuang" and other names, which have contributed to the new tea market. According to the research and experiments of The Institute of Medicinal Plant Development (China)-Guangxi Branch and some other Chinese medicine research institutions in Guangxi, Golden camellia tea has the functions of preventing cancer, inhibiting tumor growth, lowering blood pressure, lowering blood lipids, lowering cholesterol, preventing atherosclerosis, delaying aging and other health effects as improve the body's immune.

== Gallery ==
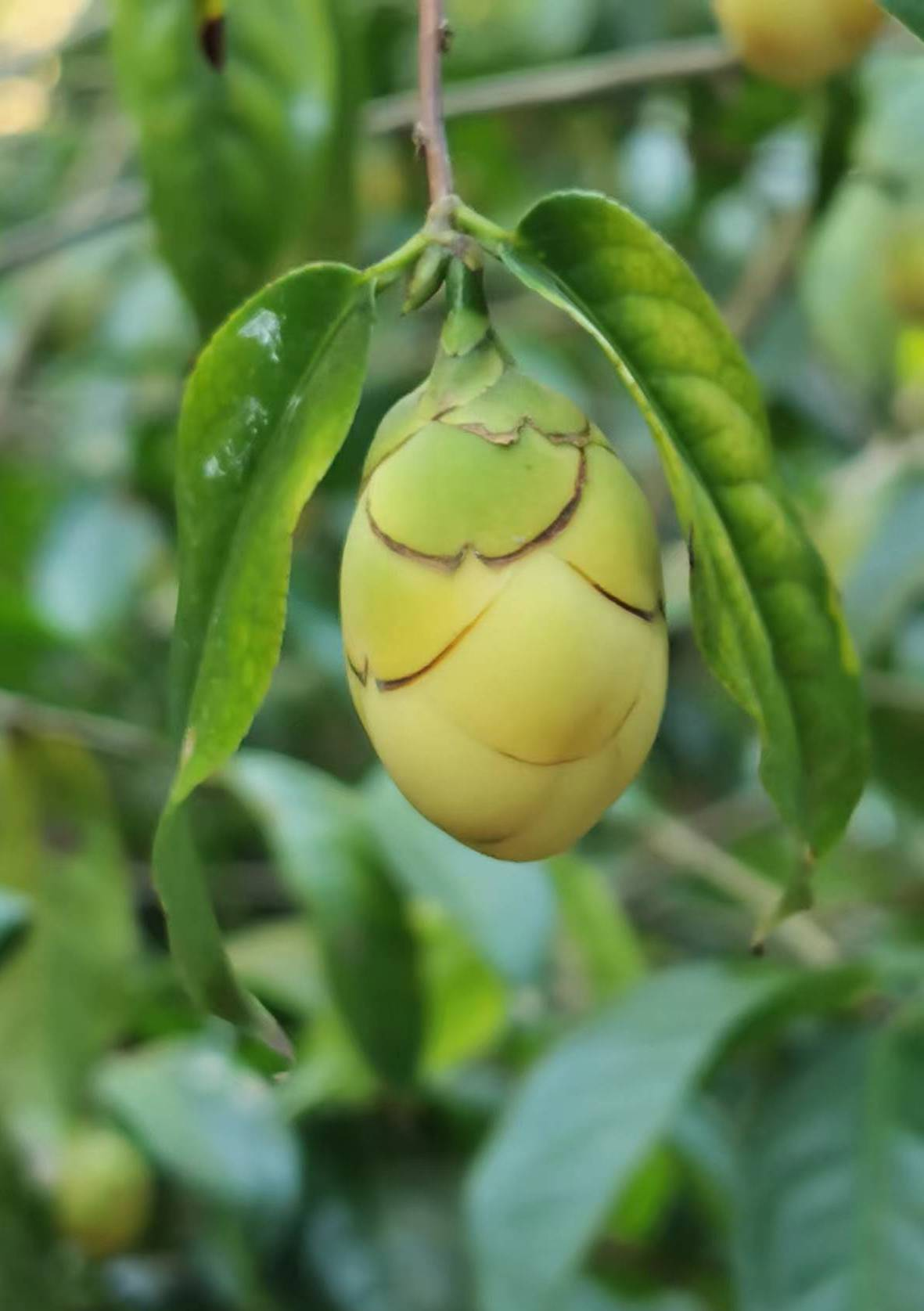

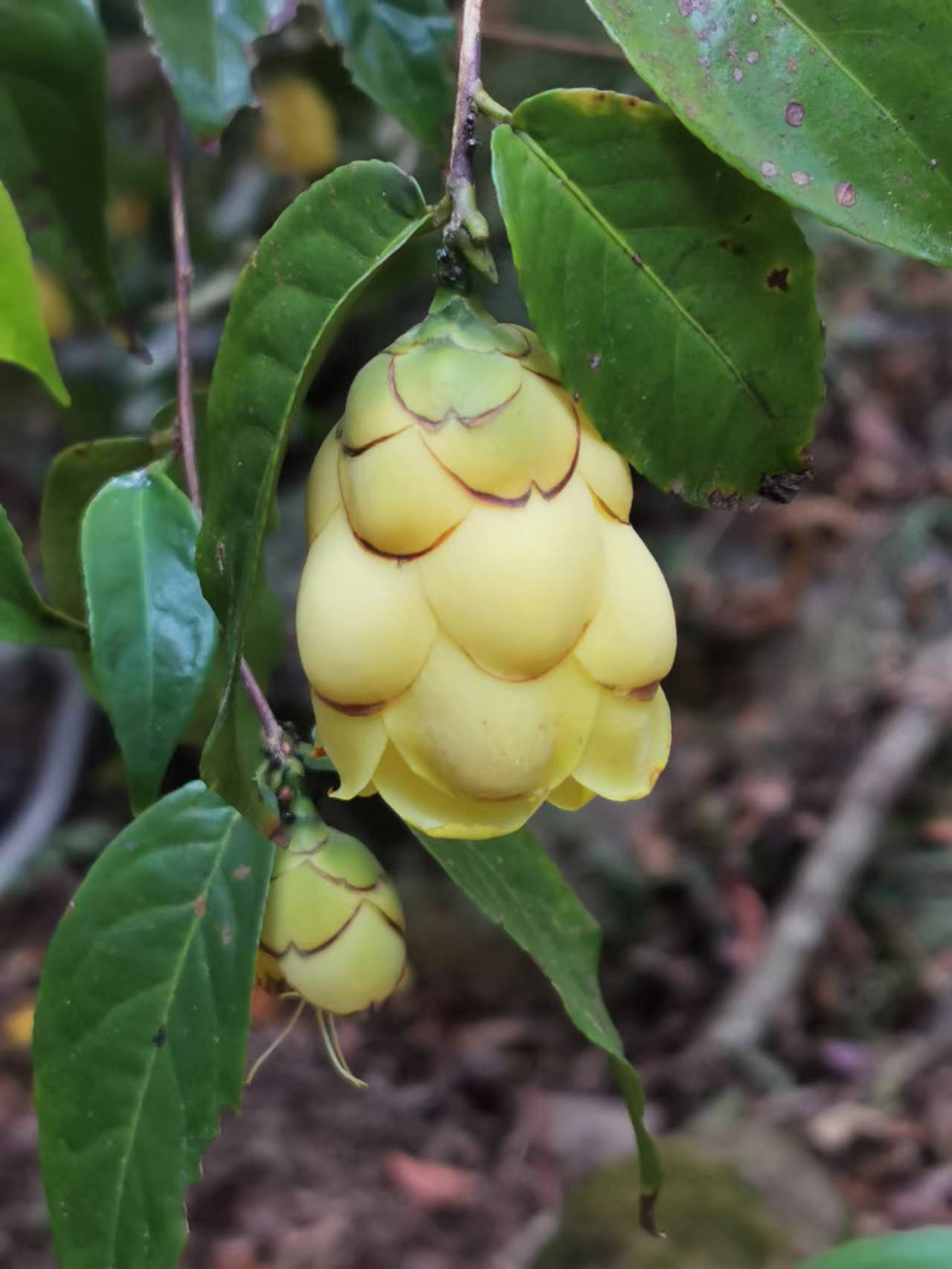

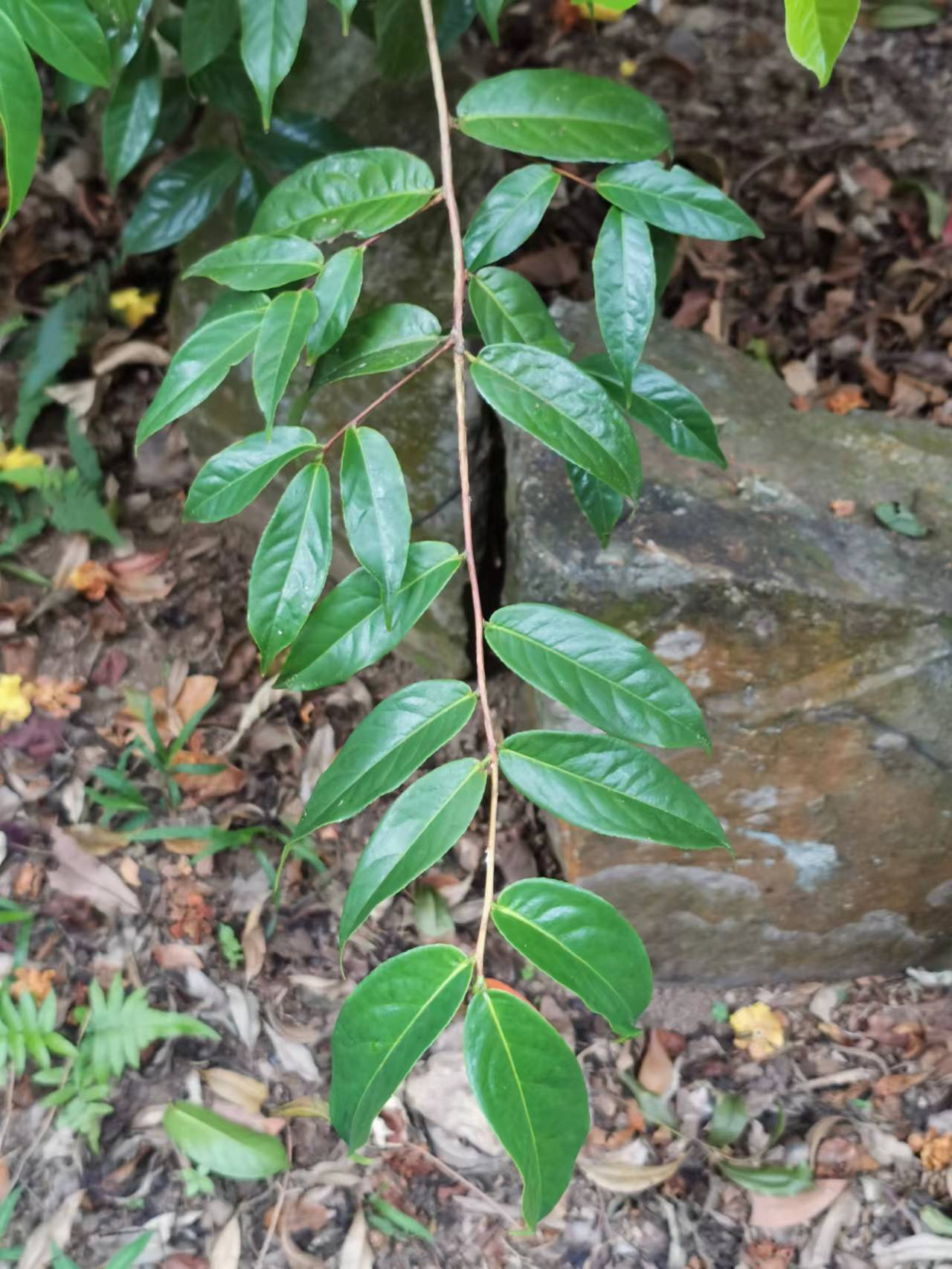

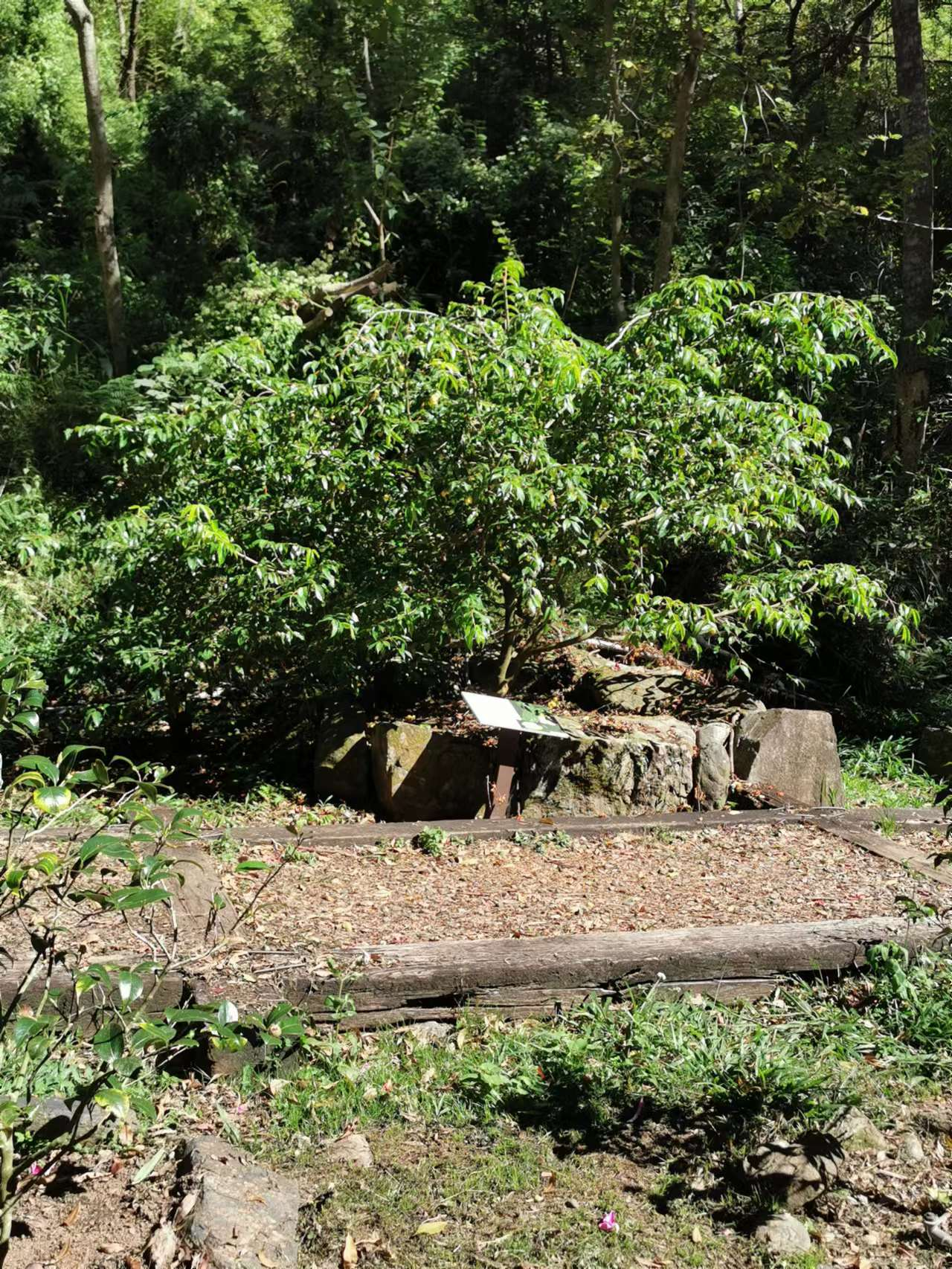
