= Elizabeth Mrema =

Tanzanian biodiversity leader and lawyer

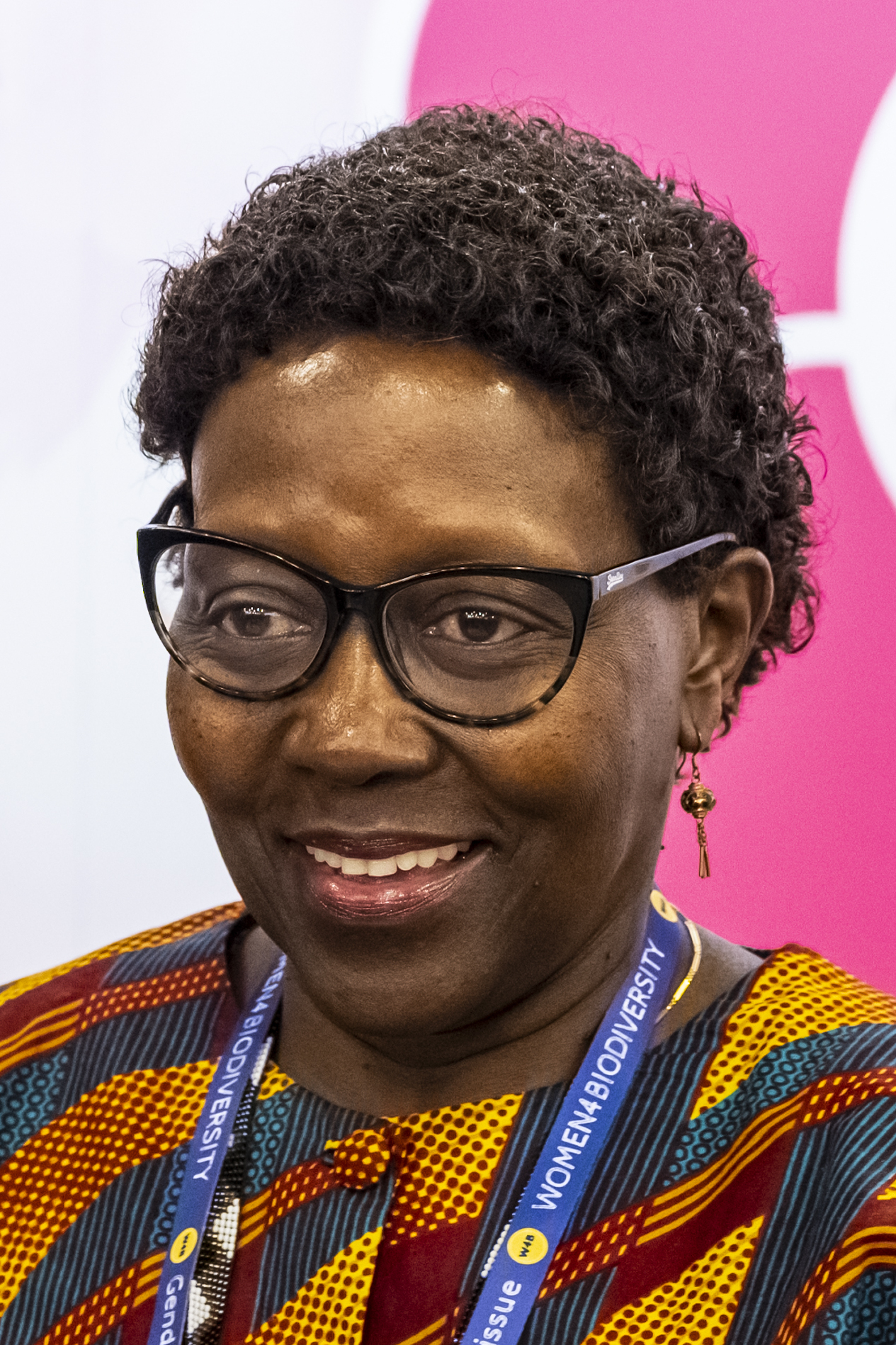
- Born: 5 January 1957; Moshi Municipal Council
- Alma mater: University of Dar es Salaam
- Occupation: Civil servant, lawyer
- Awards: Kew International Medal

Elizabeth Maruma Mrema is a Tanzanian biodiversity leader and lawyer who has been serving as Deputy Executive Director of the United Nations Environment Programme (UNEP) since 2023, under the leadership of Executive Director Inger Andersen.

From 2020 to 2022, Mrema was executive secretary of the United Nations Convention on Biological Diversity (CBD); she was the first African woman to hold this role. She previously held numerous leadership positions within UNEP.

== Early life and education ==
Born of Chagga parents, Mrema was raised in Kilimanjaro Region. She then earned a Bachelor of Law from Tanzania's University of Dar es Salaam, followed by a Master of Law degree from Dalhousie University in Halifax, Canada and a Postgraduate Diploma in International Relations and Diplomacy from the Centre of Foreign Relations and Diplomacy in Dar es Salaam, Tanzania.

== Career ==
Before beginning work with UNEP, Mrema worked for Tanzania's Ministry of Foreign Affairs and East African Cooperation, serving as a Counsellor/Senior Legal Counsel. She also lectured in Public International Law and Conference Diplomacy at Tanzania's Centre for Foreign Relations.

From 2009 to 2012, Mrema worked at organizations based in Bonn, Germany. In 2009, she was appointed Acting Executive Secretary of the UNEP/ASCOBANS (Agreement on the Conservation of Small Cetaceans of the Baltic, North East Atlantic, Irish and North Seas), Executive Secretary of the UNEP/Secretariat of the Convention on the Conservation of Migratory Species of Wild Animals (CMS), and Interim Executive Secretary of the UNEP/Gorilla Agreement.

From 2012, Mrema served as deputy director of the Ecosystems Division at the United Nations Environment Programme (UNEP). In this position she was tasked with overseeing the organization's coordination, operations, and programme delivery. She was then appointed Director of the Law Division at the United Nations Environment Programme (UNEP) in June 2014. In 2018 she additionally served as acting director of the Corporate Services Division. She was the Director of the Law Division and has worked with UNEP for over two decades.

In November 2019, Mrema served an interim position as Officer in Charge of the CBD Secretariat. Starting in December 2019, Mrema served as Acting Executive Secretary of the United Nations Convention on Biological Diversity (CBD) Secretariat. In July 2020 it was announced that she would be appointed the Executive Secretary role.

== Other professional work ==
In addition to leadership roles, Mrema serves as a pro bono lecturer at the University of Nairobi - Law School, and has previously lectured pro bono at International Development Law Organization (IDLO), Rome, Italy.

Mrema has published numerous articles on international environmental law and developed influential handbooks and guidelines for multilateral environmental agreements as well as other topics on environmental law.

== Honors and awards ==
In 2007, Mrema received the first-ever UNEP-wide Best Manager of the Year Award (the UNEP Baobab Staff Award) "for exceptional performance and dedication towards achieving the goals of UNEP".

In 2021, the IUCN World Commission on Environmental Law (WCEL), in collaboration with the United Nations Environment Programme (UNEP), awarded Mrema with the Nicholas Robinson Award for Excellence in Environmental Law.

In 2022, Mrema was awarded the Kew International Medal by the Royal Botanic Gardens, Kew for her "vital work in championing the importance of biodiversity conservation and leading the most important international law mechanism for the sustainable use of biodiversity".

In 2023 she was included by Time magazine in their list of 'The 100 Most Influential People of 2023'.
