= Plexaure crassiuscula =

Green caterpillar orchid

Scientific classification
- Kingdom: Plantae
- Clade: Tracheophytes
- Clade: Angiosperms
- Clade: Monocots
- Order: Asparagales
- Family: Orchidaceae
- Subfamily: Epidendroideae
- Genus: Plexaure
- Species: P. crassiuscula

Binomial name
- Plexaure crassiuscula (Nicholls) M.A.Clem. & D.L.Jones

Synonyms
- Oberonia crassiuscula Dockrill nom. inval., pro syn.; Oberonia crassiuscula Nicholls nom. inval., pro syn.; Phreatia crassiuscula Nicholls

Species of orchid

Plexaure crassiuscula, commonly known as green caterpillar orchid, is a plant in the orchid family and is an epiphyte or lithophyte with three to six fleshy, channelled leaves in a fan-like arrangement. Up to sixty tiny white, cream-coloured or greenish flowers are arranged along a curved flowering stem. It is endemic to tropical North Queensland.

== Description ==
Plexaure crassiuscula is an epiphytic or lithophytic herb with a short stem, thin roots and between three and six thick, fleshy, dark green deeply channelled leaves 40–60 mm (1.6–2.4 in) long and about 10 mm (0.39 in) wide in a fan-like arrangement. Between twenty and sixty white, cream-coloured or greenish, non-resupinate flowers 1.5–2 mm (0.059–0.079 in) long and wide are arranged along a flowering stem 15–35 mm (0.59–1.4 in) long that is erect at first, then curves downwards. The sepals and petals are about 1 mm (0.039 in) long and spread widely apart from each other. The labellum is about 0.7 mm (0.028 in) long and wide and dished. Flowering occurs between January and April.

== Taxonomy and naming ==
This species was first described in 1945 by William Henry Nicholls who gave it the name Phreatia crassiuscula in The Victorian Naturalist from a specimen collected on Mount Bartle Frere by Alf Glindeman. Nicholls noted that there were specimens of the same species in Ferdinand von Mueller's herbarium and that Mueller had named Oberonia crassiuscula. Nicholls described the epithet crassiuscula "an eminently fitting one, referring as it does to its salient characteristic, namely, the thick fleshy Crassula-like foliage". In 2004, Mark Alwin Clements and David l. Jones transferred the species to Plexaure as P. crassiuscula in the journal The Orchadian, and the name is accepted by the Australian Plant Census.

== Distribution and habitat ==
Green caterpillar orchid usually grows on mossy rainforest trees between the Cedar Bay and Paluma Range National Parks.
