= Joseph Robert Sealy =

- Born: 1907
- Died: 1 August 2000 (aged 92–93)
- Occupation: Botanist
- Known for: Camellia
- Spouse: Stella Ross-Craig
- Scientific career
- Author abbrev. (botany): Sealy

Joseph Robert Sealy (1907 – 1 August 2000) was an English botanist. He began his career in botany in 1925, working at Kew Gardens, with Thomas Archibald Sprague in the tropical crops section. Later, in 1927, he worked in a herbarium with Arthur William Hill. He was appointed Assistant Botanist in 1940. His specialty was the Flora of China, especially Camellia.

In his personal life he was married to fellow botanist and colleague Stella Ross-Craig (1906–2006).

== Publications ==
- 1958. A Revision of the Genus Camellia.

He is the botanical author of iris graeberiana, which was first published in Botanical Magazine 167: t. 126 in 1950.
