= Stella Ross-Craig =

British botanist and botanical illustrator

- Born: 19 March 1906; Aldershot, England
- Died: 6 February 2006 (aged 99); Isleworth, England
- Known for: Botanical Illustration
- Spouse: Joseph Robert Sealy
- Awards: Kew International Medal (1999); Veitch Memorial Medal (2002)

Chrysanthemum × rubellum by artists Lilian Snelling and Stella Ross-Craig, published in Curtis's Botanical Magazine in 1939

Stella Ross-Craig (19 March 1906 – 6 February 2006) was an English illustrator best known as a prolific illustrator of native flora.

== Early life and education ==
Ross-Craig was born in Aldershot in 1906; her parents were Scottish and her father was a chemist. Interested in botany from her youth, she studied at the Thanet Art School and attended drawing classes at the Chelsea Polytechnic.

== Career ==
In 1929, she began work as a botanical illustrator and taxonomist at Kew Gardens and was a contributor to Curtis's Botanical Magazine and Icones Plantarum of William Jackson Hooker. Her work drew the attention of Sir Edward Sailsbury, the director of Kew, who brought her to a publisher.

=== Drawings of British Plants ===
The first in Ross-Craig's series Drawings of British Plants was published in 1948. The series was issued as a set of inexpensive paperbacks retailing initially for 6 shillings, a departure from similar books for professionals and wealthy amateurs. The series eventually grew to 31 parts, taking until 1973 to complete and containing over 1300 lithographic plates. The series contained all the British flowering plants except for the grasses and sedges. She often drew from preserved dried specimens kept at Kew, and she worked in black and white.

=== Honours and awards ===
In 1999 Ross-Craig became only the sixth person to receive the Kew International Medal. In 2003, 55 of her originals were exhibited at the Royal Botanic Garden Edinburgh, when she was aged 95. The works were subsequently exhibited at the Kew Gardens Gallery the next year. Ross-Craig was a Fellow of the Linnean Society from 1948 to 1974. She was awarded the Royal Horticultural Society's Gold Veitch Memorial Medal in 2002.

== Personal life ==
She was married to the botanist, her colleague Joseph Robert Sealy, whom she first met at Chelsea Polytechnic.
