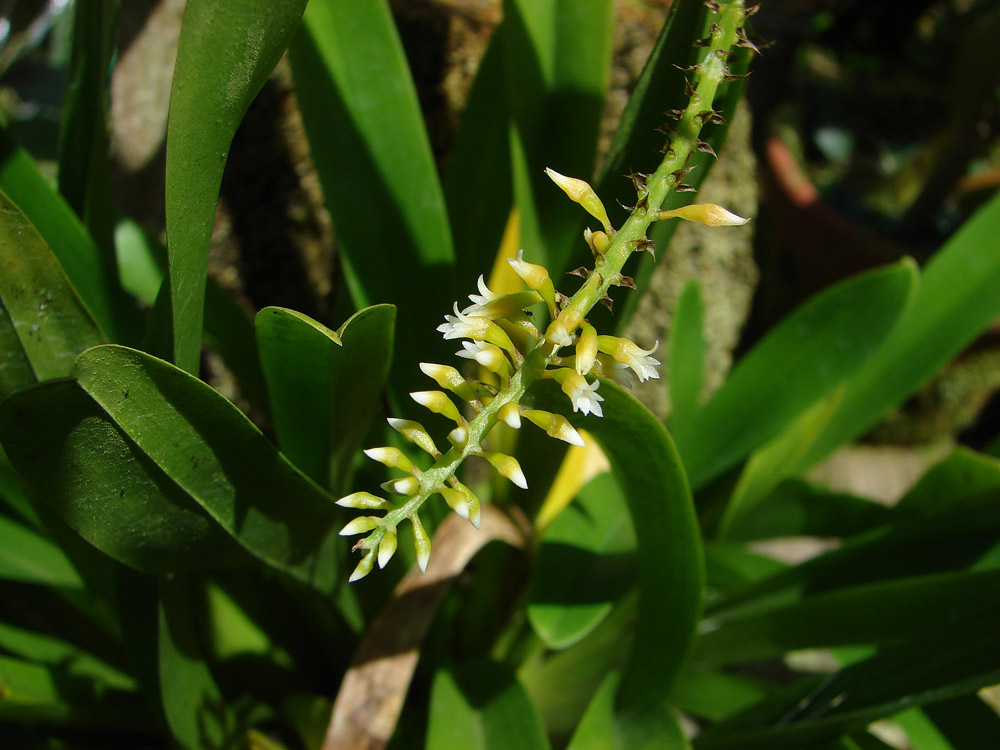

Scientific classification
- Kingdom: Plantae
- Clade: Tracheophytes
- Clade: Angiosperms
- Clade: Monocots
- Order: Asparagales
- Family: Orchidaceae
- Subfamily: Epidendroideae
- Genus: Thelasis
- Species: T. carinata

Binomial name
- Thelasis carinata Blume

Synonyms
- Synonyms: Phreatia carinata (Blume) Miq.; Eria carinata (Blume) Rchb.f. in B.Seemann nom. illeg.; Oxyanthera carinata (Blume) Schltr.; Euproboscis griffithii Rchb.f.; Thelasis elata Hook.f.; Oxyanthera elata (Hook.f.) Hook.f.; Oxyanthera papuana Schltr. in K.M.Schumann & C.A.G.Lauterbach; Thelasis carinata f. semipelorica J.J.Sm.; Thelasis papuana (Schltr.) W.Kittr.

= Thelasis carinata =

Triangular fly orchid

Species of orchid

Thelasis carinata, commonly known as the triangular fly orchid, is a plant in the orchid family. It is a clump-forming epiphyte or lithophyte that lacks pseudobulbs. There are groups of between two and six erect, flattened stems each with up to six leaves that have a ridged lower surface. Up to fifteen green and white flowers are arranged on a thin but stiff flowering stem. This orchid is found from Thailand to the southwest Pacific.

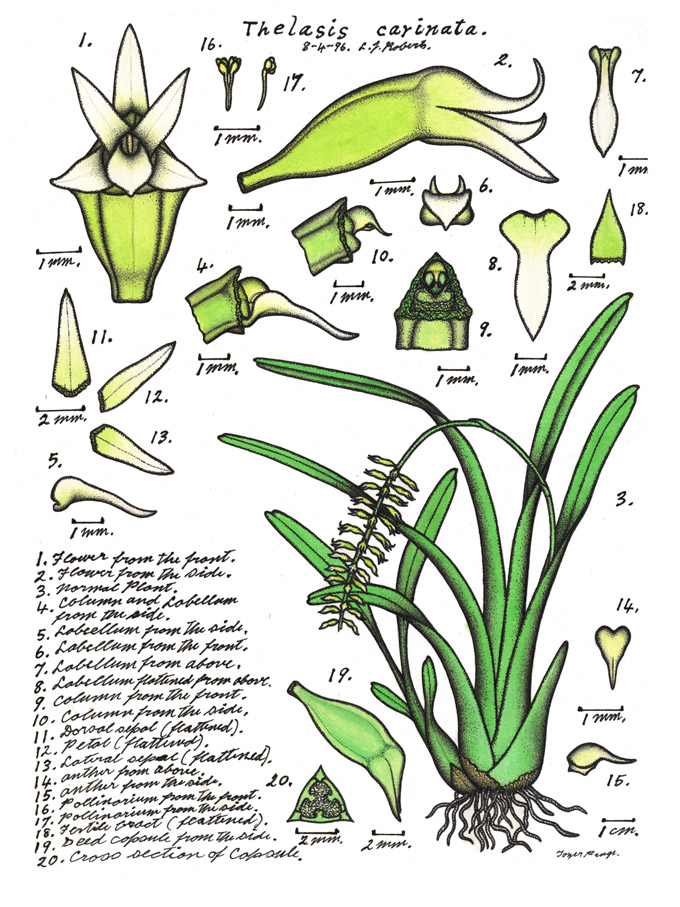
Illustration by Lewis Roberts

== Description ==
Thelasis carinata is an epiphytic or lithophytic herb with thin roots and flattened stems 20–50 mm (0.79–2.0 in) long in groups of between two and six. Each stem has between three and six dark green, narrow oblong leaves 200–300 mm (7.9–12 in) long and 25–28 mm (0.98–1.1 in) wide. The leaves have a ridge on their lower side and their lower end sheaths the stem. Between six and fifteen green and white resupinate flowers 5–7 mm (0.20–0.28 in) long and 3–4 mm (0.12–0.16 in) wide are arranged along a thin but stiff flowering stem 200–400 mm (7.9–16 in) long emerging from a leaf axil. The flowers are self-pollinating, tube-shaped near their bases and have an ovary that is triangular in cross section. The sepals are 4–6 mm (0.16–0.24 in) long and 1.5 mm (0.059 in) wide, the lateral sepals about 4 mm (0.16 in) long and 1–1.5 mm (0.039–0.059 in) wide and the petals are shorter and narrower than the sepals. The labellum is about 4 mm (0.16 in) long and 2.5 mm (0.098 in) wide and curves downwards. Flowering occurs between April and June.

== Taxonomy and naming ==
Thelasis carinata was first formally described in 1825 by Carl Ludwig Blume who published the description in Bijdragen tot de flora van Nederlandsch Indië. The specific epithet (carinata) is a Latin word meaning "keeled".

== Distribution and habitat ==
The triangular fly orchid usually grows on rocks and trees in humid, well-lit situations. It is found in Thailand, Borneo, Java, the Lesser Sunda Islands, Peninsular Malaysia, Maluku Islands, the Philippines, Sulawesi, Sumatra New Guinea, the Solomon Islands, Queensland, Australia, New Caledonia and Samoa. In Queensland it occurs between the Iron Range and McIlwraith Range.
