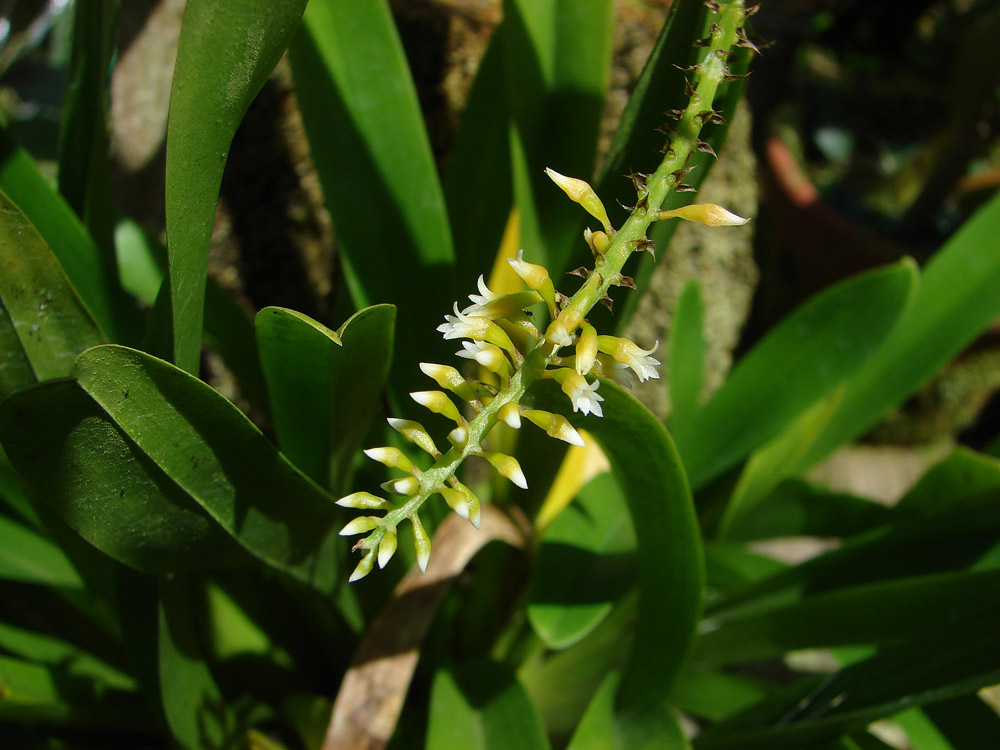
- Thelasis carinata

Scientific classification
- Kingdom: Plantae
- Clade: Tracheophytes
- Clade: Angiosperms
- Clade: Monocots
- Order: Asparagales
- Family: Orchidaceae
- Subfamily: Epidendroideae
- Tribe: Podochileae
- Subtribe: Thelasiinae
- Genus: Thelasis; Blume

Synonyms
- Euproboscis Griff.; Oxyanthera Brongn. in L.I.Duperrey; Rhynchophreatia (Schltr.) Schltr.

= Thelasis =

Genus of orchids

Thelasis, commonly known as fly orchids, is a genus of flowering plants from the orchid family, Orchidaceae. Plants in this genus are usually epiphytes, sometimes lithophytes or rarely terrestrials. Some species have pseudobulbs with up to three leaves, whilst others have several leaves in two ranks. A large number of small, white or greenish yellow flowers are borne on a thin, arching flowering stem. There are about thirty species, distributed from tropical and subtropical Asia to the southwest Pacific.

== Description ==
Plants in the genus Thelasis are mostly epiphytic or lithophytic, rarely terrestrial sympodial herbs with thin roots. They often have small pseudobulbs with up to three leaves but sometimes have flattened stems with several leaves in two ranks. Many small white or greenish yellow flowers are crowded on a thin arching flowering stem. The flowers are resupinate, tube-shaped near the base with sepals and petals free from and similar to each other although with the petals usually shorter and narrower. The labellum is stiffly attached to the base of the column and lacks lobes.

== Taxonomy and naming ==
The genus Thelasis was first formally described in 1825 by Carl Ludwig Blume who published the description in Bijdragen tot de flora van Nederlandsch Indië . The name Thelasis is derived from the Ancient Greek word thelazo meaning "suckle" or "nurse", possibly referring to a small nipple-like structure on the column.

=== Species list ===
The following is a list of species of Thelasis accepted by the Plants of the World Online as at October 2025:

- Thelasis angustifolia J.J.Sm. - New Guinea
- Thelasis bifolia Hook.f. - Assam
- Thelasis borneensis Schltr. - Borneo
- Thelasis capitata Blume - conical fly orchid, Christmas Island, Thailand, Malaysia, Indonesia, Philippines
- Thelasis carinata Blume - triangular fly orchid, Queensland, Thailand, Malaysia, Indonesia, Philippines, New Guinea, Solomon Islands, Samoa
- Thelasis carnosa Ames & C.Schweinf. in O.Ames - Sabah
- Thelasis cebolleta J.J.Sm. - Borneo
- Thelasis celebica Schltr. - Sulawesi
- Thelasis compacta Schltr. - New Guinea
- Thelasis copelandii Kraenzl. in H.G.A.Engler - New Guinea
- Thelasis cycloglossa Schltr. - New Guinea
- Thelasis gautierensis J.J.Sm. - New Guinea
- Thelasis globiceps J.J.Sm. - New Guinea
- Thelasis javanica J.J.Sm. - Java
- Thelasis khasiana Hook.f. - Yunnan, Assam, Thailand, Vietnam
- Thelasis longifolia Hook.f. - Nepal, India, Sikkim, Bhutan, Assam
- Thelasis macrobulbon Ridl - Malaysia, Borneo
- Thelasis mamberamensis J.J.Sm. - New Guinea
- Thelasis micrantha (Brongn.) J.J.Sm. - Myanmar, Thailand, Vietnam, Malaysia, Indonesia, Philippines, New Guinea
- Thelasis obtusa Blume - Bali, Java, Borneo, Sumatra, Philippines
- Thelasis palawensis (Schltr.) Ormerod
- Thelasis perpusilla (C.S.P.Parish & Rchb.f.) Schuit. – Indochina
- Thelasis pygmaea (Griff.) Lindl. - Hainan, Hong Kong, Taiwan, Yunnan Nepal, Sikkim, Assam, Bhutan, Andaman & Nicobar Islands, Indochina, Malaysia, Indonesia, New Guinea, Bismarck Islands, Solomon Islands
- Thelasis rhomboglossa (Schltr.) Kraenzl. in H.G.A.Engler - Sumatra
- Thelasis sphaerocarpa (Schltr.) J.J.Sm.
- Thelasis succosa Carr - Malaysia
- Thelasis variabilis Ames & C.Schweinf. in O.Ames - Sabah, Sarawak
- Thelasis wariana (Schltr.) Schuit. & de Vogel - New Guinea

== Distribution ==
Orchids in the genus Thelasis are found in China, Taiwan, the Indian subcontinent, the Andaman Islands, Cambodia, Laos, Myanmar, the Nicobar Islands, Thailand, Vietnam, Borneo, Java, the Lesser Sunda Islands, Peninsular Malaysia, the Maluku Islands, the Philippines, Sulawesi, Sumatra, Christmas Island, the Bismarck Archipelago, New Guinea, the Solomon Islands, Queensland (Australia) and Samoa.

== See also ==
- List of Orchidaceae genera
