= Hung-ta Chang =

Chinese botanist and ecologist

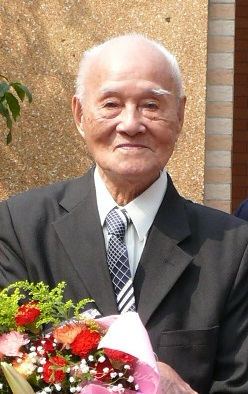
Professor Hung Ta Chang in 2009

Hung Ta Chang (Hung-ta Chang, Zhang Hongda, 张宏达, October 1914 – 20 January 2016), was a Chinese botanist and ecologist.

== Early life ==
Chang was born in October 1914 in Jiexi County of Guangdong Province, PR China. Chang died in January 2016 at the age of 101. He graduated from the Biology Department of Sun Yat-sen University in 1939, and stayed as an academic in the same university after that. He was a senior professor and Head of the department. He was the President of the Ecological Society of Guangdong Province and the Botanical Society of Guangdong Province.

== Career ==
Chang was among the first group of professors qualified as Supervisors of PhD Students in China. He supervised over 100 masters, PhD students and postdoctoral fellows. He was the leader of Botany Discipline at Sun Yat-sen University after 1954. He established a Germany cooperation project and established a Rainforest Research Station in Bawangling, Hainan Province in 1987; and a Ministry of Education Tropical Subtropical Forest Ecosystem Experiment Station at the Heishiding of Guangdong in the same year.

=== Research achievements ===
He travelled to mountains all over China, including Guangdong, Guangxi, Hunan, Sichuan, and Yunnan Provinces. In plant taxonomy, he discovered 7 new plant genera and nearly 400 new plant species. He published 27 monographs and textbooks, and over 300 scientific papers. He was an expert on camellia flower and tea.

Chang's major contribution on botanical theory was the Cathaysian origin of flowering plants, which was published in 1980 on the journal of Sun Yat-sen University. His theory has been cited inside and outside China.

In 1986, he proposed a classification system of seed plants, spermatophytes, and divided the Spermatophyta into 10 subdivisions, including the flowering plants Phanerogamophytina.

=== Awards and recognition ===
He contributed to 4 volumes of the Flora Republicae Popularis Sinicae, which was later translated into English as the Flora of China. The monograph series received the very prestigious China State Natural Science First Class Award in 2009, and he was one of the ten awardees.

His work together with collaborators on chemotaxonomy of Murraya plants has received many citations over the years.

The standard author abbreviation Hung T.Chang is used to indicate this person as the author when citing a botanical name. He is included in Wikispecies.
