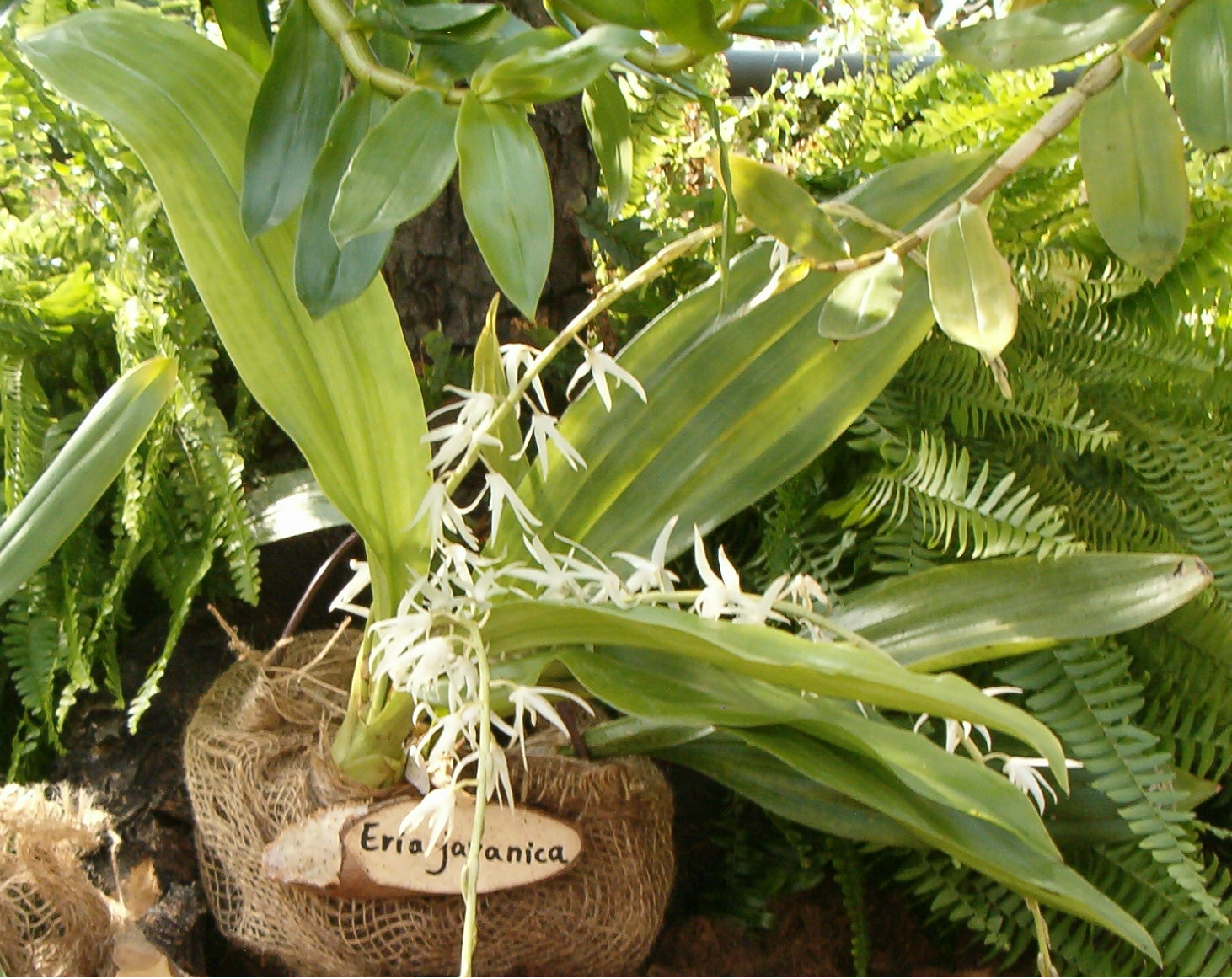
- Eria javanica

Scientific classification
- Kingdom: Plantae
- Clade: Tracheophytes
- Clade: Angiosperms
- Clade: Monocots
- Order: Asparagales
- Family: Orchidaceae
- Subfamily: Epidendroideae
- Tribe: Podochileae
- Subtribe: Eriinae
- Genus: Eria; Schltr.

Type species
- Eria stellata Lindl.

Synonyms
- Aporodes (Schltr.) W.Suarez & Cootes; Erioxantha Raf.; Exeria Raf.; Forbesina Ridl.; Gunnarorchis Brieger; Octomeria D.Don; Trichosma Lindl.; Xiphosium Griff.

= Eria =

Genus of orchids

Eria is a genus of orchids with more than 50 species distributed in China, the Himalayas, the Indian subcontinent, Southeast Asia, New Guinea, Polynesia, Melanesia and Micronesia.

== Species ==
Eria species accepted by Plants of the World Online as of February 2021:

- Eria albescens Ridl.
- Eria aurantiaca Ridl.
- Eria bancana J.J.Sm.
- Eria berringtoniana Rchb.f.
- Eria bifalcis Lindl.
- Eria bigibba Rchb.f.
- Eria binabayensis Ames
- Eria carolettae Hance
- Eria chlorantha Aver. & Averyanova
- Eria clausa King & Pantl.
- Eria compressoclavata J.J.Sm.
- Eria convallariopsis Kraenzl.
- Eria coronaria (Lindl.) Rchb.f.
- Eria curtisii Rchb.f.
- Eria dayana Rchb.f.
- Eria decipiens Schltr.
- Eria floribunda Lindl.
- Eria gagnepainii A.D.Hawkes & A.H.Heller
- Eria geboana Ormerod
- Eria genuflexa J.J.Sm.
- Eria halconensis Ames
- Eria imbricata J.J.Sm.
- Eria imitans Schltr.
- Eria imperatifolia Ormerod
- Eria javanica (Sw.) Blume
- Eria Jarensis
- Eria kaniensis Schltr.
- Eria lactiflora Aver.
- Eria micholitziana Kraenzl.
- Eria nepalensis Bajrach. & K.K.Shrestha
- Eria oblonga (Trimen) Bajrach. & K.K.Shrestha
- Eria odorifera Leav.
- Eria pachycephala Kraenzl.
- Eria peraffinis J.J.Sm.
- Eria puberula Ridl.
- Eria ramosii Leav.
- Eria ramuana Schltr.
- Eria rhomboidalis Tang & F.T.Wang
- Eria rostriflora Rchb.f.
- Eria sabasaroe Ormerod
- Eria sarcophylla Schltr.
- Eria sarrasinorum Kraenzl.
- Eria scabrilinguis Lindl.
- Eria sessilifolia (J.Fraser) D.L.Roberts & Sayers
- Eria stenobulba Schltr.
- Eria straminea Kraenzl.
- Eria tomohonensis Kraenzl.
- Eria umbonata F.Muell. & Kraenzl.
- Eria villosissima Rolfe
- Eria viridibracteata Ridl.
- Eria vittata Lindl.
- Eria wenzelii Ames
- Eria yanshanensis S.C.Chen

== Formerly placed here ==
Many former Eria species have been recategorized in other genera (e.g. Bryobium, Cylindrolobus, Cryptochilus, Dendrolirium, Mycaranthes, Pinalia, Plocoglottis):

- Eria acervata, now known as Pinalia acervata
- Eria acuminata, now known as Aeridostachya acuminata
- Eria amica, now known as Pinalia amica
- Eria anceps, now known as Mycaranthes anceps
- Eria bambusifolia, now known as Bambuseria bambusifolia
- Eria bipunctata, now known as Pinalia bipunctata
- Eria candoonensis, now known as Mycaranthes candoonensis
- Eria carinata, now known as Cryptochilus acuminatus
- Eria clemensiae, now known as Mycaranthes clemensiae
- Eria cymbidifolia, now known as Ascidieria cymbidifolia
- Eria cyrtosepala, now known as Callostylis cyrtosepala
- Eria davaensis, now known as Mycaranthes davaensis
- Eria dischorensis, now known as Bryobium dischorense
- Eria discolor, now included in Callostylis rigida
- Eria eriaeoides, now known as Bryobium eriaeoides
- Eria excavata, now known as Pinalia excavata
- Eria ferruginea Lindl., now known as Dendrolirium ferrugineum
- Eria ferruginea Teijsm. & Binn., now known as Aeridostachya robusta
- Eria fitzalanii, now known as Pinalia fitzalanii
- Eria gigantea, now known as Mycaranthes gigantea
- Eria globifera, now known as Campanulorchis globifera
- Eria graminifolia, now known as Pinalia graminifolia
- Eria irukandjiana, now known as Bryobium irukandjianum
- Eria kingii F.Muell., now known as Pinalia moluccana
- Eria kingii Hook.f., now known as Mycaranthes oblitterata
- Eria lamellata, now known as Mycaranthes lamellata
- Eria lasiopetala, now known as Dendrolirium lasiopetalum
- Eria leiophylla, now known as Campanulorchis leiophylla
- Eria longibracteata, now known as Mycaranthes longibracteata
- Eria longifolia, now known as Ascidieria longifolia
- Eria mindanaensis, now known as Mycaranthes mindanaensis
- Eria monophylla, now included in Bryobium pudicum
- Eria ornata, now known as Dendrolirium ornatum
- Eria palawanensis, now known as Ascidieria palawanensis
- Eria pellipes, now known as Campanulorchis pellipes
- Eria pholidotoides, is now included in Callostylis rigida
- Eria pulchella, now known as Callostylis pulchella
- Eria queenslandica, now known as Bryobium queenslandicum
- Eria scortechinii, now known as Dilochiopsis scortechinii
- Eria stricta, now known as Pinalia stricta
- Eria vanoverberghii, now known as Mycaranthes vanoverberghii
- Eria zamboangensis, now known as Ascidieria zamboangensis
