= E. floribunda =

E. floribunda may refer to:

- Embelia floribunda, a climbing shrub
- Eria floribunda, a tropical orchid
- Erica floribunda, a winter heather
- Ervatamia floribunda, a plant with fragrant flowers
- Exocarpos floribunda, a semi-parasitic sandalwood
