= Pinalia xanthocheila =

Scientific classification
- Kingdom: Plantae
- Clade: Tracheophytes
- Clade: Angiosperms
- Clade: Monocots
- Order: Asparagales
- Family: Orchidaceae
- Subfamily: Epidendroideae
- Genus: Pinalia
- Species: P. xanthocheila

Binomial name
- Pinalia xanthocheila (Ridl.) W.Suarez & Cootes

Synonyms
- Eria xanthocheila Ridl.

Species of orchid

Pinalia xanthocheila is a species in the plant family Orchidaceae.

This species of Orchidaeceae is natively ranged to W. Malesia, Indo-China. It propagates primarily in wet tropical biome, as a lithophyte or pseudobulbous epiphyte.

== Description ==
The plant is erect, sympodial, and with a creeping rhizome as thick as the pseudobulbs which are 30 cm long by 1 cm diameter. This species of Pinalia has about four leaves that are of 15 cm long and 2.5 cm wide. Each pseudobulb would have three inflorescences that are arching, which bear up to 40 flowers 1.5 cm in diameter.

== Taxonomy ==
Henry Nicholas Ridley named this species in 1907 in the Material for a Flora of the Malay archipelago, under the genus Eria. This orchid species has been moved to Pinalia, but the taxonomy is under review.

The species name xanthocheila refers to the bright yellow labellum.

== Distribution and habitat ==
Pinalia xanthocheila is found in the lowlands of Thailand, Malaysia, Sumatra, and Java, and was recorded in the Philippines in a yet undisclosed location. It grows as an epiphyte at elevations up to 1,200 meters.
