= Pinalia chrysocardium =

Scientific classification
- Kingdom: Plantae
- Clade: Embryophytes
- Clade: Tracheophytes
- Clade: Spermatophytes
- Clade: Angiosperms
- Clade: Monocots
- Order: Asparagales
- Family: Orchidaceae
- Subfamily: Epidendroideae
- Genus: Pinalia
- Species: P. chrysocardium

Binomial name
- Pinalia chrysocardium (Schltr.) Schuit., Y.P.Ng & H.A.Pedersen

Synonyms
- Eria chrysocardia Schltr.

Species of plant

Pinalia chrysocardium is a species of orchid. It is native to Sumatra. It was reassigned from the genus Eria.
