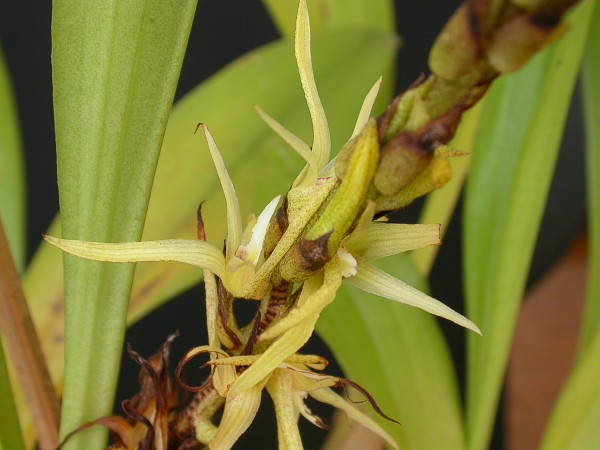

Scientific classification
- Kingdom: Plantae
- Clade: Tracheophytes
- Clade: Angiosperms
- Clade: Monocots
- Order: Asparagales
- Family: Orchidaceae
- Subfamily: Epidendroideae
- Genus: Eria
- Species: E. javanica

Binomial name
- Eria javanica (Sw.) Blume

Synonyms
- Callista perakensis (Hook.f.) Kuntze; Dendrobium javanicum Sw. (Basionym); Dendrobium perakense Hook.f.; Dendrolirium rugosum Blume; Eria cochleata Lindl.; Eria fragrans Rchb.f.; Eria inamoena Schltr.; Eria rugosa (Blume) Lindl.; Eria stellata Lindl.; Eria striolata Rchb.f.; Eria vaginata (Breda, Kuhl & Hasselt) Benth.; Katherinea perakensis (Hook.f.) A.D. Hawkes; Octomeria stellata (Lindl.) Spreng.; Octomeria vaginata Breda, Kuhl & Hasselt; Pinalia fragrans (Rchb.f.) Kuntze; Pinalia rugosa (Blume) Kuntze; Pinalia stellata (Lindl.) Kuntze; Pinalia striolata (Rchb.f.) Kuntze; Sarcopodium perakense (Hook.f.) Kraenzl.; Tainia stellata (Lindl.) Pfitzer

= Eria javanica =

Species of orchid

Eria javanica is a species of orchid, which is a plant. It is the type species of the genus Eria. It is widespread from Sikkim east to Taiwan, and through much of Southeast Asia to New Guinea.
