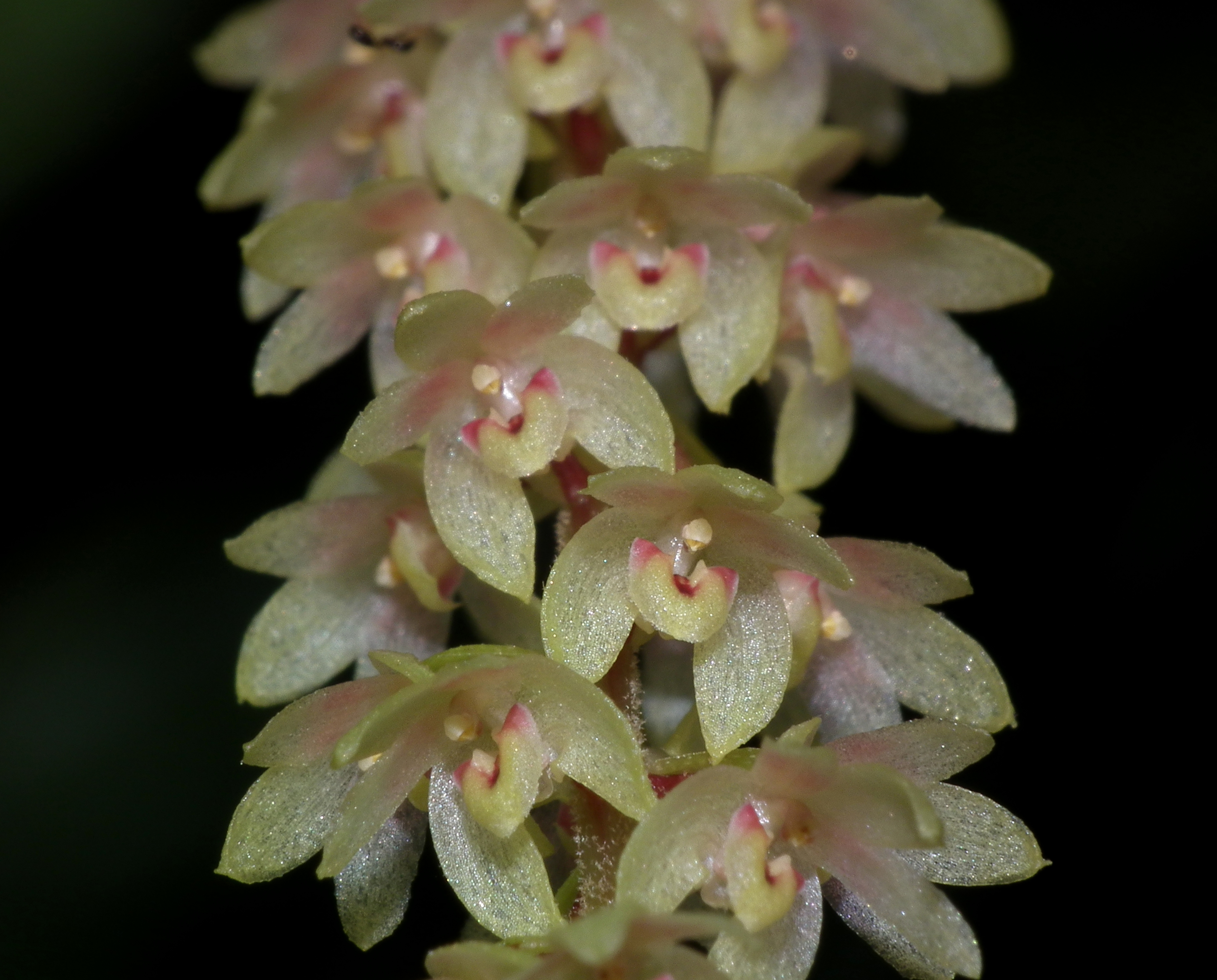

Scientific classification
- Kingdom: Plantae
- Clade: Tracheophytes
- Clade: Angiosperms
- Clade: Monocots
- Order: Asparagales
- Family: Orchidaceae
- Subfamily: Epidendroideae
- Genus: Pinalia
- Species: P. polyura

Binomial name
- Pinalia polyura (Lindl.) Kuntze

Synonyms
- Eria polyura Lindl.

= Pinalia polyura =

Species of orchid

Pinalia polyura, or many-tailed pinalia, is a member of the orchid family endemic to the Philippines. It is semi-pendulous and sympodial, with pseudobulbs that are 20 cm long, 1 cm in diameter, and somewhat club shaped. Each new growth begins halfway along the previous year's pseudobulbs, making the plant longer each year. Each pseudobulb has about 5 shiny, lanceolate leaves approximately 15 cm long and 2 cm wide. Inflorescences appear at the upper portion of the plant and are pendulous, about 10 cm long and bear up to 40 flowers each 1.5 cm in diameter. It grows as an epiphyte and sometimes as a semi-terrestrial plant at elevations to 2,400 meters.

== Taxonomic history ==
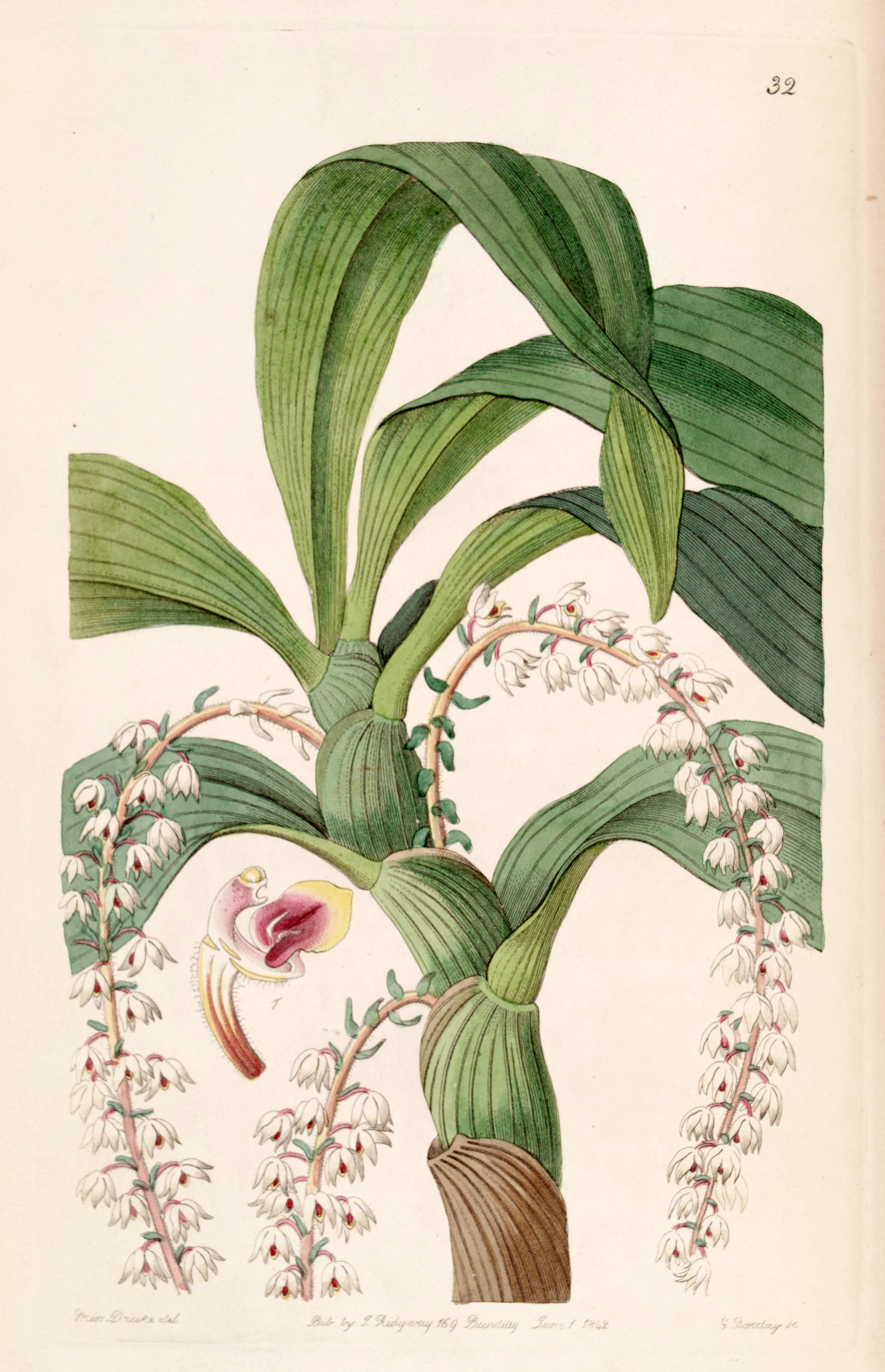
Illustration from Edwards's Botanical Register, volume 28 (NS 5) plate 32, 1842, by Sarah Drake

John Lindley named this species Eria polyura in 1841 in Edwards's Botanical Register. It was moved to the genus Pinalia in 1892 by Otto Kuntze.
