= Pinalia tenuiflora =

Scientific classification
- Kingdom: Plantae
- Clade: Tracheophytes
- Clade: Angiosperms
- Clade: Monocots
- Order: Asparagales
- Family: Orchidaceae
- Subfamily: Epidendroideae
- Genus: Pinalia
- Species: P. tenuiflora

Binomial name
- Pinalia tenuiflora (Ridl.) J.J.Wood

Synonyms
- Eria gibbsiae Rolfe; Eria godefroyana Gagnep.; Eria tenuiflora Ridl.

Species of orchid

Pinalia tenuiflora is a species of orchid.
