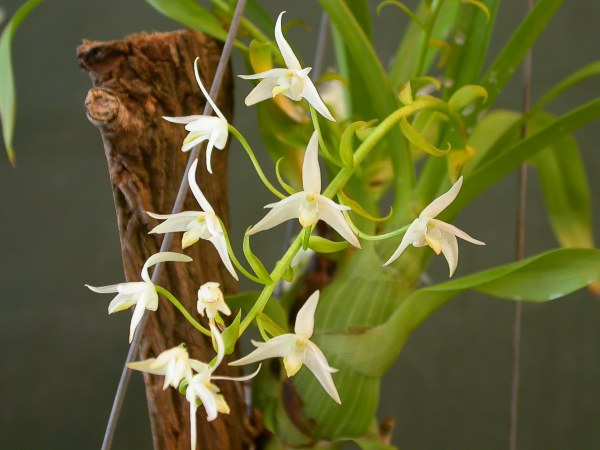

Scientific classification
- Kingdom: Plantae
- Clade: Tracheophytes
- Clade: Angiosperms
- Clade: Monocots
- Order: Asparagales
- Family: Orchidaceae
- Subfamily: Epidendroideae
- Genus: Pinalia
- Species: P. elata

Binomial name
- Pinalia elata (Hook.f.) Kuntze

Synonyms
- Eria elata Hook.f.

= Pinalia elata =

Species of orchid

Pinalia elata is a species of orchid found in Peninsular Malaysia.
