= Bryobium retusum =

Christmas Island urchin orchid

Scientific classification
- Kingdom: Plantae
- Clade: Tracheophytes
- Clade: Angiosperms
- Clade: Monocots
- Order: Asparagales
- Family: Orchidaceae
- Subfamily: Epidendroideae
- Genus: Bryobium
- Species: B. retusum

Binomial name
- Bryobium retusum (Blume) Y.P.Ng & P.J.Cribb

Synonyms
- Dendrolirium retusum Blume; Phreatia retusa (Blume) Lindl.; Eria retusa (Blume) Rchb.f.; Pinalia retusa (Blume) Kuntze; Bryobium pubescens Lindl.; Eria pusilla Teijsm. & Binn. nom. illeg.; Phreatia congesta Rolfe

Species of orchid

Bryobium retusum, commonly known as Christmas Island urchin orchid, is an epiphytic clump-forming orchid that has oval, fleshy green pseudobulbs, each with two leaves and between seven and twelve short-lived, self-pollinating, pale green, hairy flowers. This orchid is found between Java and New Caledonia.

== Description ==
Bryobium retusum is an epiphytic herb that forms small dense clumps with crowded, cylindrical pseudobulbs 15–20 millimetres (0.59–0.79 in) long and 7–10 millimetres (0.28–0.39 in) wide. Each pseudobulb has two linear to lance-shaped leaves 60–130 millimetres (2.4–5.1 in) long and 6–8 millimetres (0.24–0.31 in) wide. Between seven and twelve pale green flowers about 2.5 millimetres (0.098 in) long and wide are arranged on a flowering stem 10–25 millimetres (0.39–0.98 in) long. The flowers are self-pollinating, short-lived and hairy on the outside. The sepal and petals are about 4 millimetres (0.16 in) long and 2 millimetres (0.079 in) wide, the petals slightly narrower than the sepals. The labellum is about 1 millimetre (0.039 in) long and wide with a small callus. Flowering occurs from September to November.

== Taxonomy and naming ==
Christmas Island urchin orchid was first formally described in 1825 by Carl Ludwig Blume who gave it the name Dendrolirium retusum and published the description in Bijdragen tot de flora van Nederlandsch Indië. In 2005 Yan Peng Ng and Phillip Cribb changed the name to Bryobium retusum. The specific epithet (retusum) is a Latin word meaning "blunted", "rounded" or "notched at the apex".

== Distribution and habitat ==
Bryobium retusum grows near the top of rainforest trees. It is found in Borneo, Java, the Lesser Sunda Islands, New Guinea, the Solomon Islands, New Caledonia and the Australian territory of Christmas Island.
