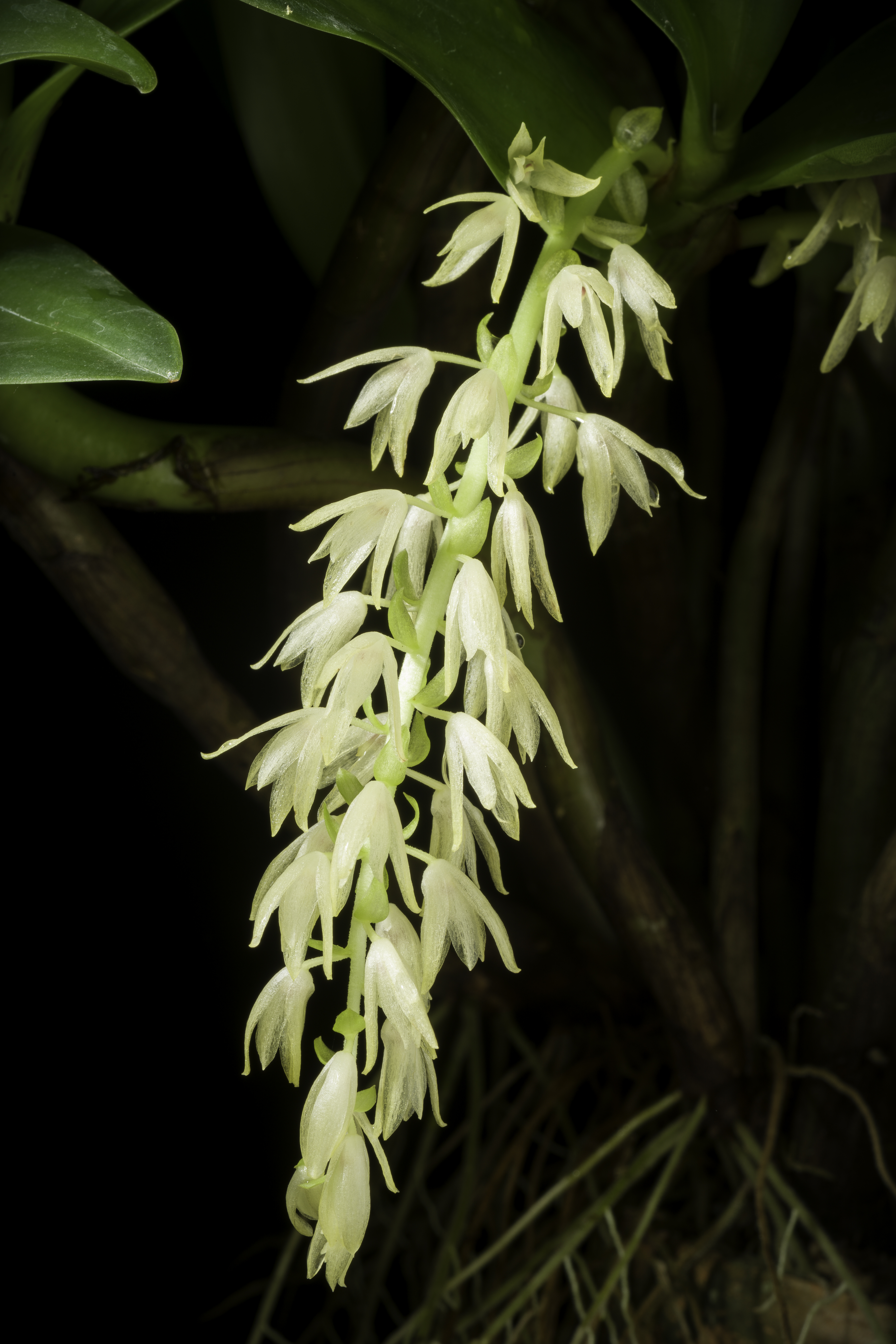

Scientific classification
- Kingdom: Plantae
- Clade: Tracheophytes
- Clade: Angiosperms
- Clade: Monocots
- Order: Asparagales
- Family: Orchidaceae
- Subfamily: Epidendroideae
- Genus: Pinalia
- Species: P. ovata

Binomial name
- Pinalia ovata (Lindl.) W.Suarez & Cootes

Synonyms
- List: Eria ovata Lindl.; Eria bidentata Nakai; Eria bontocensis Ames; Eria elmeri Ames; Eria luchuensis Yatabe; Eria merrillii Ames; Eria nudicaulis Hayata; Eria ovata var. retroflexa (Lindl.) Garay & H.R.Sweet; Eria racemosa Leav.; Eria retroflexa Lindl.; Pinalia ovata var. retroflexa (Lindl.) W.Suarez & Cootes; Pinalia retroflexa (Lindl.) Kuntze

= Pinalia ovata =

Species of orchid

Pinalia ovata is a species of orchid found from the Ryukyu Islands and Taiwan to the Philippines. It is an epiphyte that is found growing below 800 m (2,600 ft) elevation. This species is erect and sympodial with pseudobulbs 100–250 mm (3.9–9.8 in) long and 10–20 mm (0.39–0.79 in) in diameter. It has about 4 or 5 narrowly elliptic leaves 120–160 mm (4.7–6.3 in) long and 35–45 mm (1.4–1.8 in) wide.
