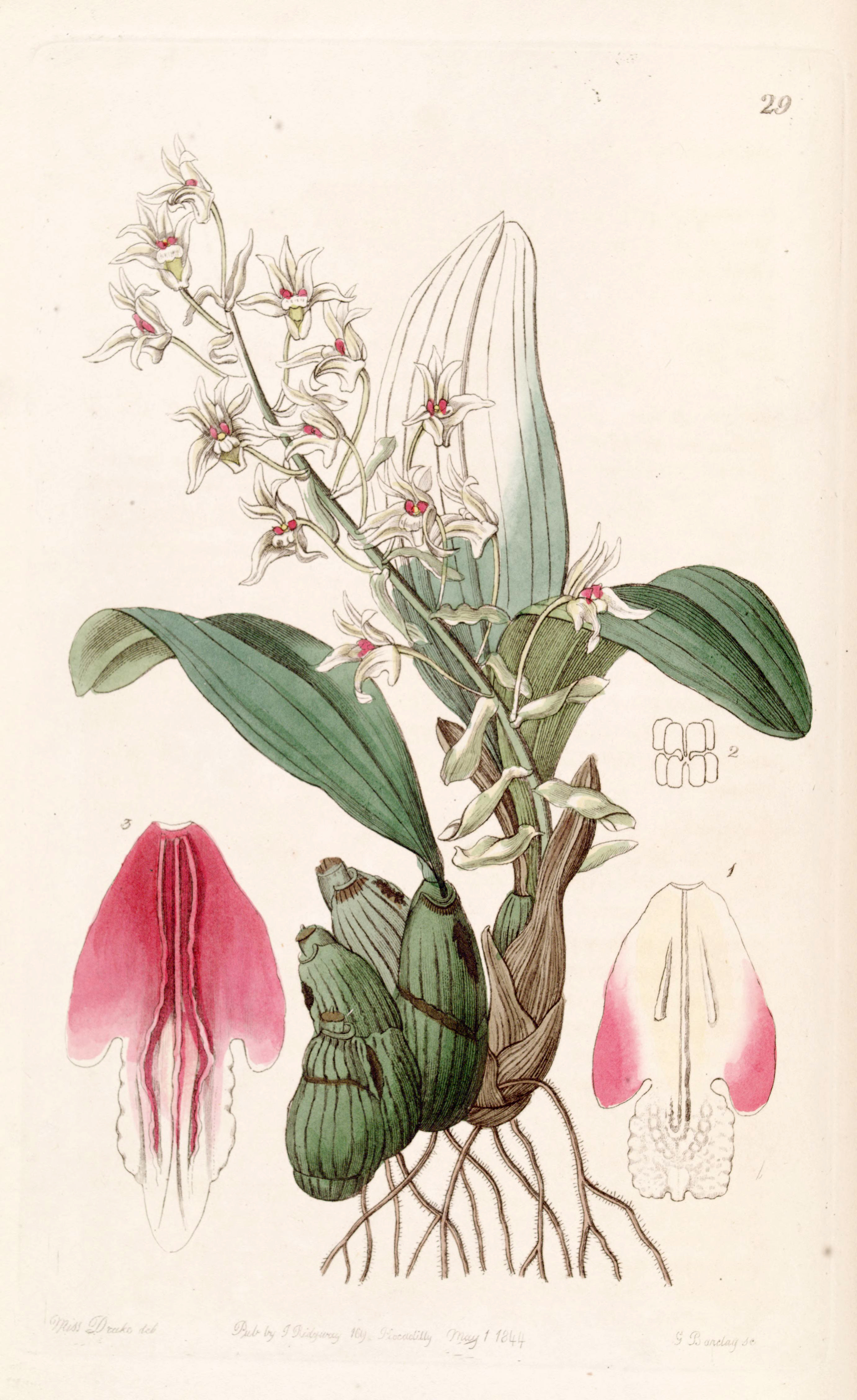
- Illustration in Edwards's Botanical Register (as Eria bractescens)

Scientific classification
- Kingdom: Plantae
- Clade: Tracheophytes
- Clade: Angiosperms
- Clade: Monocots
- Order: Asparagales
- Family: Orchidaceae
- Subfamily: Epidendroideae
- Genus: Pinalia
- Species: P. bractescens

Binomial name
- Pinalia bractescens (Lindl.) Kuntze

Synonyms
- Eria bractescens Lindl.; Trias bractescens (Lindl.) Mason; Eria dillwynii Hook.; Eria pulchella Griff. nom. illeg.; Trias pulchella Mason; Eria littoralis Teijsm. & Binn.; Eria griffithii Rchb.f.; Eria bractescens var. kurzii Hook.f.; Eria kurzii Anderson ex Hook.f. pro syn.; Pinalia pulchella Kuntze; Eria bractescens var. latipetala Leav.; Dendrobium subterrestre Gagnep.; Tropilis subterrestris (Gagnep.) Rauschert

= Pinalia bractescens =

Species of orchid

Pinalia bractescens is a species of orchid.
