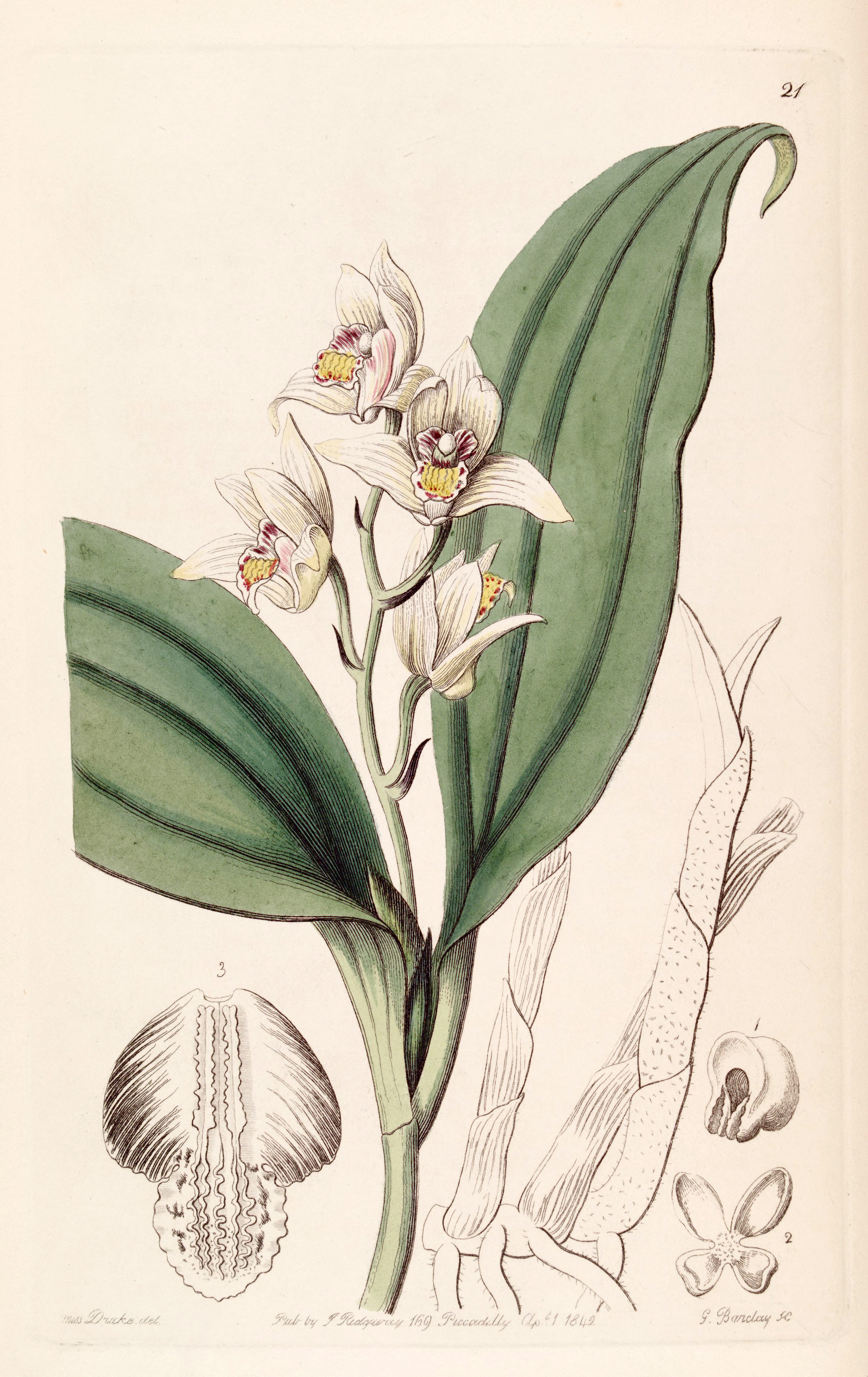
- 1842 illustration from Edwards's Botanical Register

Scientific classification
- Kingdom: Plantae
- Clade: Tracheophytes
- Clade: Angiosperms
- Clade: Monocots
- Order: Asparagales
- Family: Orchidaceae
- Subfamily: Epidendroideae
- Genus: Eria
- Species: E. coronaria

Binomial name
- Eria coronaria (Lindl.) Rchb.f. (1861)

Synonyms
- Coelogyne coronaria Lindl. (Basionym); Eria cylindripoda Griff.; Eria medogensis S.C.Chen & Z.H.Tsi; Eria suavis (Lindl.) Lindl.; Trichosma cylindropoda Griff.; Trichosma coronaria (Lindl.) Kuntze; Trichosma coronaria (Lindl.) Brieger nom. illeg.; Trichosma suavis Lindl.

= Eria coronaria =

Species of orchid

Eria coronaria is a species of orchid. It is native to Guangxi, Hainan, Tibet, Yunnan, the Himalayas, Thailand and Vietnam.
