= Pinalia affinis =

Scientific classification
- Kingdom: Plantae
- Clade: Tracheophytes
- Clade: Angiosperms
- Clade: Monocots
- Order: Asparagales
- Family: Orchidaceae
- Subfamily: Epidendroideae
- Genus: Pinalia
- Species: P. affinis

Binomial name
- Pinalia affinis (Griff.) Ormerod

Synonyms
- Eria affinis Griff.; Eria bractescens var. affinis (Griff.) Hook.f.; Trias affinis (Griff.) Maso

Species of plant

Pinalia affinis is a species of flowering plant in the family Orchidaceae.
