= Pinalia acutifolia =

Scientific classification
- Kingdom: Plantae
- Clade: Tracheophytes
- Clade: Angiosperms
- Clade: Monocots
- Order: Asparagales
- Family: Orchidaceae
- Subfamily: Epidendroideae
- Genus: Pinalia
- Species: P. acutifolia

Binomial name
- Pinalia acutifolia (Lindl.) Kuntze

Synonyms
- Eria acutifolia Lindl.

Species of orchid

Pinalia acutifolia is a species of plant within the orchid family. It is native to the Indian subcontinent.
