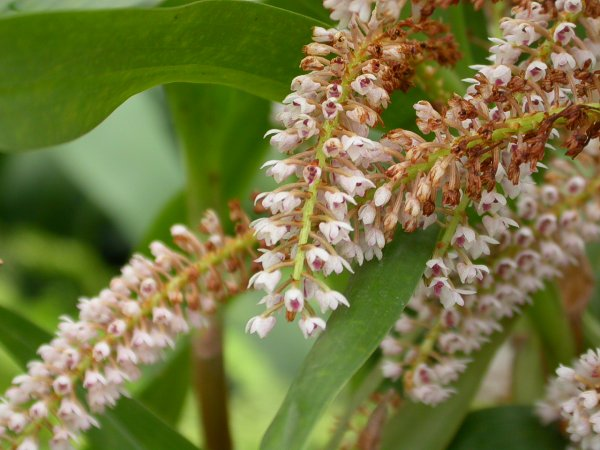

Scientific classification
- Kingdom: Plantae
- Clade: Tracheophytes
- Clade: Angiosperms
- Clade: Monocots
- Order: Asparagales
- Family: Orchidaceae
- Subfamily: Epidendroideae
- Genus: Pinalia
- Species: P. multiflora

Binomial name
- Pinalia multiflora (Blume) Kuntze

Synonyms
- Dendrolirium multiflorum Blume; Eria multiflora (Blume) Lindl.; Urostachya multiflora (Blume) Rauschert; Dendrolirium micranthum Blume; Octomeria racemosa Breda; Eria micrantha (Blume) Lindl.; Pinalia micrantha (Blume) Kuntze

= Pinalia multiflora =

Species of orchid

Pinalia multiflora is a species of orchid found in Java, the Lesser Sunda Islands and Sumatra.
