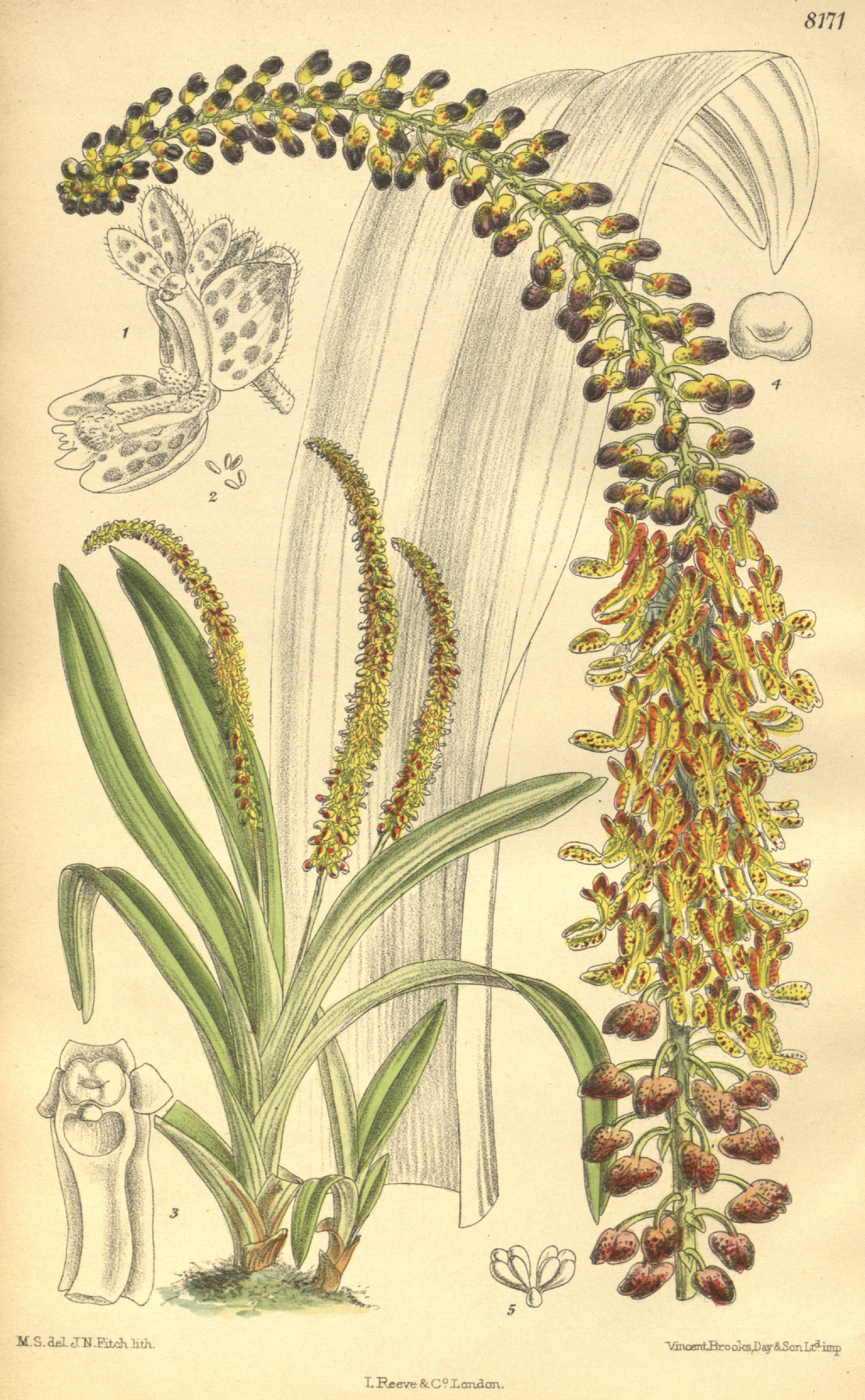
- Mycaranthes latifolia 1907 illustration

Scientific classification
- Kingdom: Plantae
- Clade: Tracheophytes
- Clade: Angiosperms
- Clade: Monocots
- Order: Asparagales
- Family: Orchidaceae
- Subfamily: Epidendroideae
- Tribe: Podochileae
- Subtribe: Eriinae
- Genus: Mycaranthes; Blume

= Mycaranthes =

Genus of orchids

Mycaranthes is a genus of orchids. It was previously considered as a synonym of the genus Eria, but eventually it has become an accepted name. Its species are native to Southeast Asia, China, the Himalayas and New Guinea.

== Species ==
1. M. anceps (Leav.) Cootes & W.Suarez - Palawan, Negros
2. M. candoonensis (Ames) Cootes & W.Suarez - Mindanao
3. M. citrina (Ridl.) Rauschert - Palawan, Borneo, Peninsular Malaysia
4. M. clemensiae (Leav.) Cootes & W.Suarez - Philippines
5. M. davaensis (Ames) Cootes & W.Suarez - Mindanao
6. M. depauperata J.J.Wood - Sabah
7. Mycaranthes farinosa (Ames & C.Schweinf.) J.J.Wood - Borneo
8. Mycaranthes floribunda (D.Don) S.C.Chen & J.J.Wood - Yunnan, Assam, Bangladesh, Bhutan, Nepal, Myanmar, Thailand, Laos, Vietnam, Cambodia, Malaysia, Borneo
9. M. forbesiana (Kraenzl.) Rauschert - Sumatra
10. M. gigantea (Ames) Cootes & W.Suarez - Philippines
11. M. hawkesii (A.H.Heller) Rauschert - New Guinea
12. M. lamellata (Ames) Cootes & W.Suarez - Leyte, Mindanao
13. M. latifolia Blume - Indonesia, Malaysia
14. M. leucotricha (Schltr.) Rauschert - New Guinea
15. M. lobata Blume - Indonesia
16. M. longibracteata (Leav.) Cootes & W.Suarez - Philippines#
17. Mycaranthes magnicallosa (Ames & C.Schweinf.) J.J.Wood - Sabah
18. M. major (Ridl.) J.J.Wood - Borneo, Maluku, Philippines
19. Mycaranthes melaleuca (Ridl.) J.J.Wood - Borneo
20. Mycaranthes meliganensis J.J.Wood - Sabah
21. M. merguensis (Lindl.) Rauschert - Myanmar, Thailand
22. M. mindanaensis (Ames) Cootes & W.Suarez - Capiz, Sibuyan
23. M. monostachya (Lindl.) Rauschert - Java, Sumatra
24. M. nieuwenhuisii (J.J.Sm.) Rauschert - Borneo
25. M. obliqua Lindl. - Borneo, Malaysia, Sumatra
26. M. oblitterata Blume -Thailand, Vietnam, Cambodia, Malaysia, Java, Borneo, Sumatra, Bali
27. M. padangensis (Schltr.) Brieger - Sumatra
28. Mycaranthes pannea (Lindl.) S.C.Chen & J.J.Wood - Guangxi, Guizhou, Hainan, Tibet, Yunnan, Bhutan, Cambodia, India, Assam, Borneo, Sumatra, Laos, Malaysia, Myanmar, Singapore, Thailand, Vietnam
29. M. rhinoceros (Ridl.) Rauschert - Sumatra
30. M. schistoloba (Schltr.) Rauschert - Sumatra
31. M. sonkaris (Rchb.f.) Rauschert - Sumatra, Borneo, Sumbawa
32. M. stenophylla (Schltr.) Rauschert - New Guinea
33. M. tjadasmalangensis (J.J.Sm.) Rauschert - Java, Sumatra
34. M. tricuspidata (Rolfe) Rauschert - Sulawesi
35. M. vanoverberghii (Ames) Cootes, D.P.Banks & W.Suarez - Philippines
