= Bryobium eriaeoides =

Brittle urchin orchid

Scientific classification
- Kingdom: Plantae
- Clade: Tracheophytes
- Clade: Angiosperms
- Clade: Monocots
- Order: Asparagales
- Family: Orchidaceae
- Subfamily: Epidendroideae
- Genus: Bryobium
- Species: B. eriaeoides

Binomial name
- Bryobium eriaeoides (F.M.Bailey) M.A.Clem. & D.L.Jones

Synonyms
- Dendrobium eriaeoides F.M.Bailey; Callista eriaeoides (F.M.Bailey) Kuntze; Eria eriaeoides (F.M.Bailey) Rolfe; Dendrobium eriae F.Muell.; Eria lorentziana J.J.Sm. & Kraenzl.; Eria diphylla Schltr.; Eria clausa J.J.Sm. nom. illeg.; Bryobium diphyllum (Schltr.) J.J.Wood; Eria torricellensis Schltr.

Species of orchid

Bryobium eriaeoides, commonly known as brittle urchin orchid, is an epiphytic or lithophytic clump-forming orchid that has fleshy, green pseudobulbs, each with two leaves and between three and twelve cup-shaped white to purplish flowers but that sometimes remain closed. This orchid occurs in New Guinea and Queensland.

== Description ==
Bryobium eriaeoides is an epiphytic or lithophytic herb that forms large clumps with cylindrical pseudobulbs 60–100 millimetres (2.4–3.9 in) long and 10–14 millimetres (0.39–0.55 in) wide covered with papery white bracts when young. Each pseudobulb has a thin elliptic to lance-shaped leaf 150–200 millimetres (5.9–7.9 in) long and 20–30 millimetres (0.79–1.2 in) wide. Between three and twelve cup-shaped, resupinate white to purplish flowers 4 millimetres (0.16 in) long and 3 millimetres (0.12 in) wide are arranged on a flowering stem 30–50 millimetres (1.2–2.0 in) long. The flowers are self-pollinating and open only slowly or not at all. The sepal and petals are about 3 millimetres (0.12 in) long and 2 millimetres (0.079 in) wide. The labellum is about 4 millimetres (0.16 in) long and wide with three lobes. The side lobes are erect and the middle lobe triangular with three ridges. Flowering occurs from August to October.

== Taxonomy and naming ==
The brittle urchin orchid was first formally described in 1888 by Frederick Manson Bailey who gave it the name Dendrobium eriaeoides and published the description in A Synopsis of the Queensland Flora. In 2002 Mark Clements and David Jones changed the name to Bryobium eriaeoides. The specific epithet (eriaeoides) refers to the similarity of this species to those in the genus Eria. The ending -oides is a Latin suffix meaning "like", "resembling" or "having the form of".

== Distribution and habitat ==
Bryobium eriaeoides grows on trees and rocks in humid situations. It is found in New Guinea and Queensland from the Iron Range to near Townsville.
