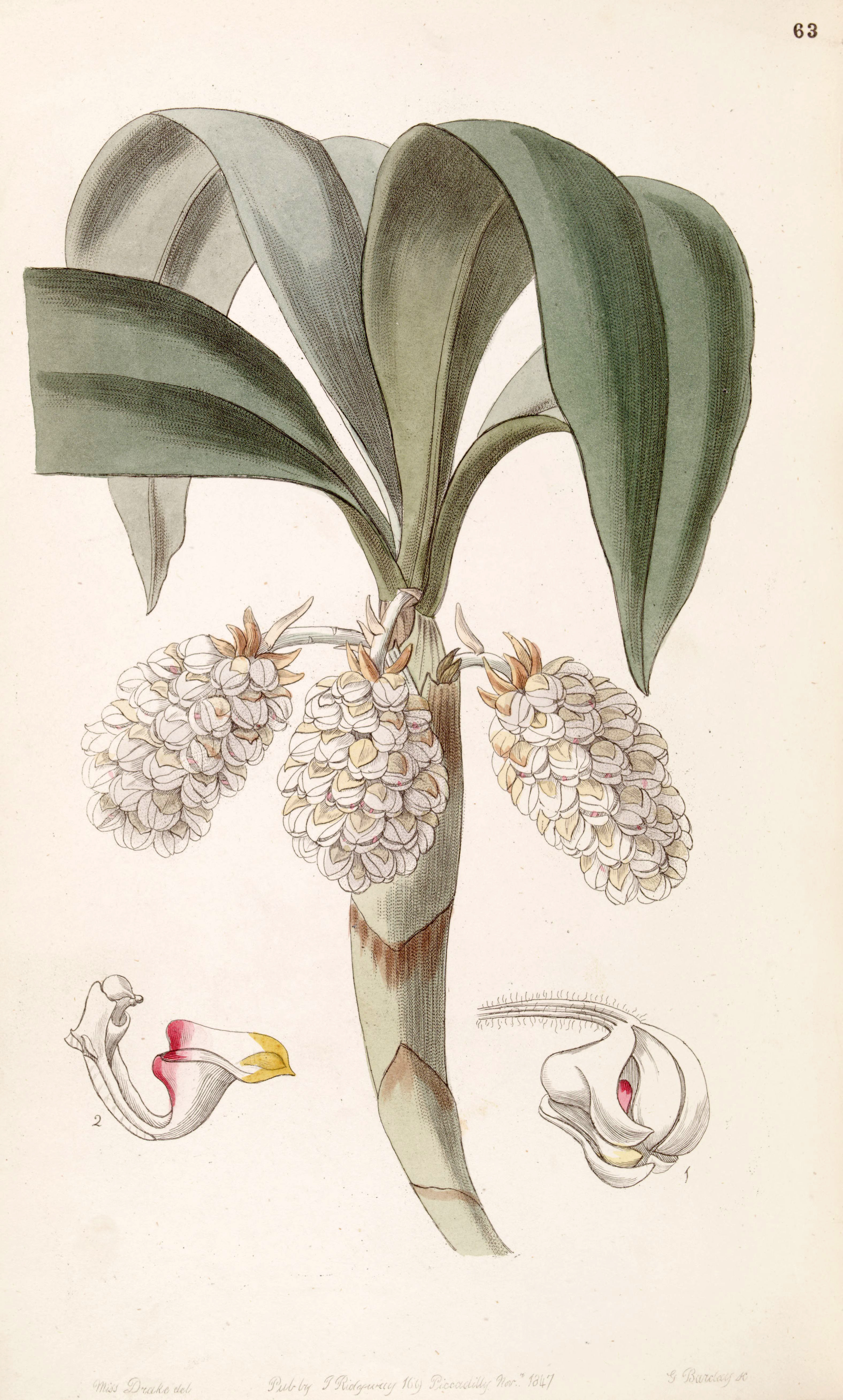

Scientific classification
- Kingdom: Plantae
- Clade: Tracheophytes
- Clade: Angiosperms
- Clade: Monocots
- Order: Asparagales
- Family: Orchidaceae
- Subfamily: Epidendroideae
- Genus: Pinalia
- Species: P. spicata

Binomial name
- Pinalia spicata (D.Don) S.C.Chen & J.J.Wood

Synonyms
- Eria convallarioides Lindl.; Eria salwinensis Hand.-Mazz.; Eria spicata (D.Don) Hand.-Mazz.; Octomeria convallarioides Wall. ex Lindl.; Octomeria spicata D.Don (basionym); Pinalia alba Buch.-Ham. ex Lindl.; Pinalia salwinensis (Hand.-Mazz.) Ormerod

= Pinalia spicata =

Species of orchid

Pinalia spicata is a species of orchid.
