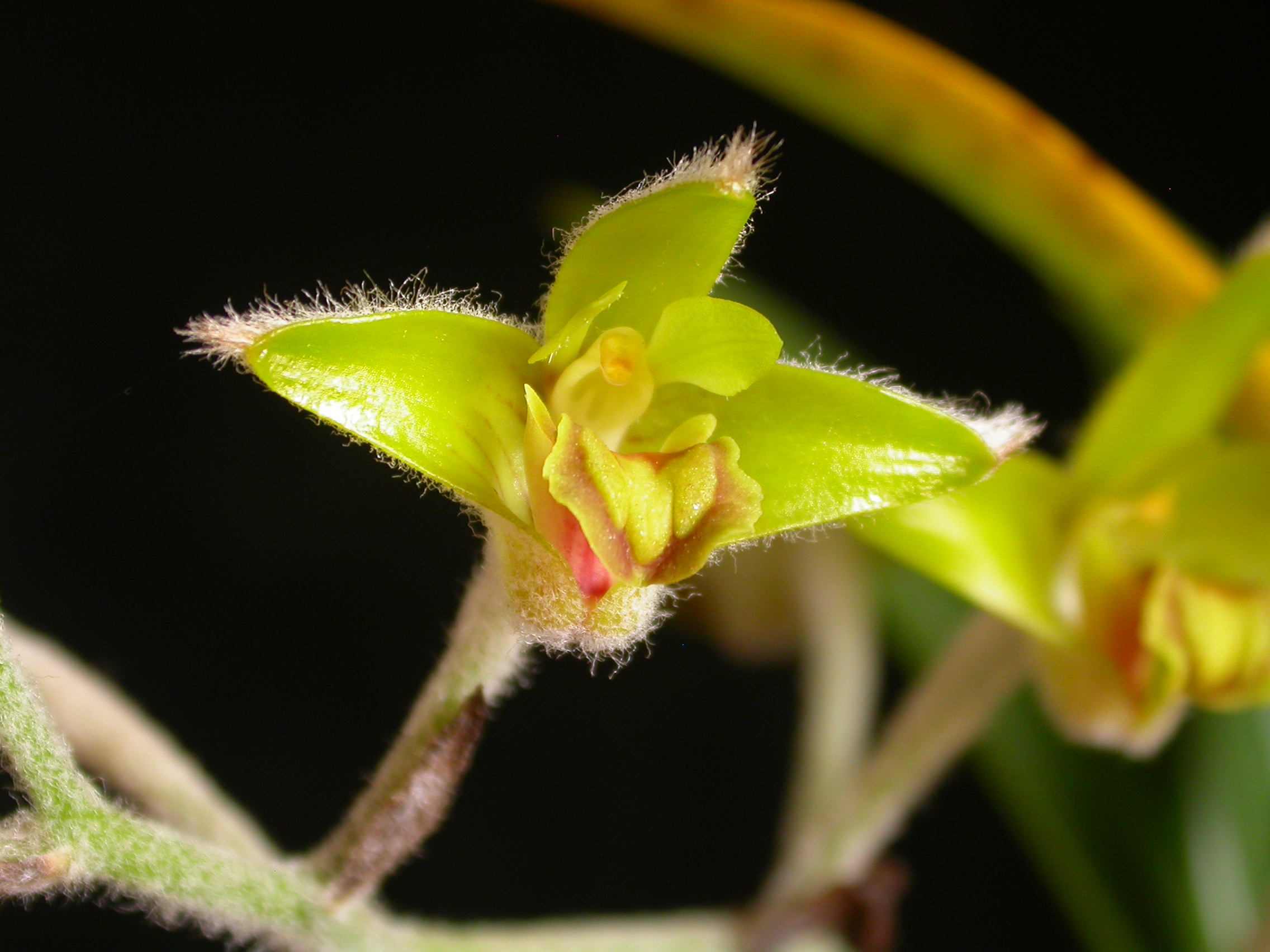

Scientific classification
- Kingdom: Plantae
- Clade: Tracheophytes
- Clade: Angiosperms
- Clade: Monocots
- Order: Asparagales
- Family: Orchidaceae
- Subfamily: Epidendroideae
- Genus: Dendrolirium
- Species: D. lasiopetalum

Binomial name
- Dendrolirium lasiopetalum (Willd.) S.C.Chen & J.J.Wood

Synonyms
- Aerides lasiopetala Willd.; Dendrobium pubescens Hook.; Dendrolirium albidotomentosum Blume; Epidendrum flos-aeris J.Koenig; Epidendrum lasiopetalum (Willd.) Poir.; Eria albidotomentosa (Blume) Lindl.; Eria flava Lindl.; Eria lanata Griff.; Eria lasiopetala (Willd.) Ormerod; Eria polystachya Wight; Eria pubescens (Hook.) Lindl. ex G.Don; Eria pubescens var. lanata (Griff.) Karth.; Octomeria flava Wall. ex Steud.; Octomeria pubescens (Hook.) Spreng.; Pinalia albidotomentosa (Blume) Kuntze; Pinalia pubescens (Hook.) Kuntze; Trias flava Mason; Trias lanata (Griff.) Mason

= Dendrolirium lasiopetalum =

Species of orchid

Dendrolirium lasiopetalum, synonym Eria lasiopetala, is a species of orchid. It is native to a region from Bangladesh east to Hong Kong, south through much of Southeast Asia to Java.
