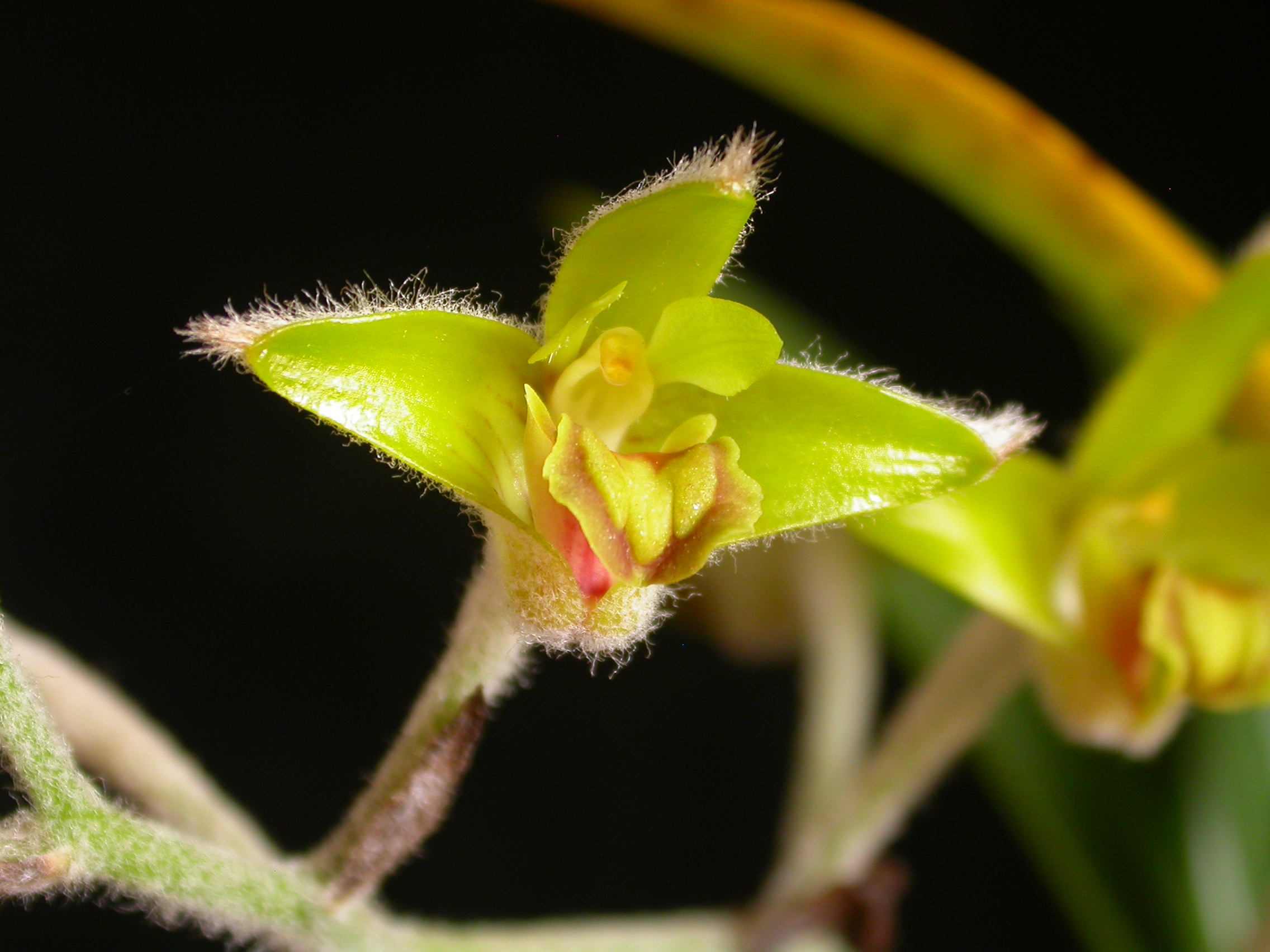
- Dendrolirium lasiopetalum

Scientific classification
- Kingdom: Plantae
- Clade: Tracheophytes
- Clade: Angiosperms
- Clade: Monocots
- Order: Asparagales
- Family: Orchidaceae
- Subfamily: Epidendroideae
- Tribe: Podochileae
- Subtribe: Eriinae
- Genus: Dendrolirium; Blume

= Dendrolirium =

Genus of orchids

Dendrolirium is a genus of orchids. Dendrolirium is abbreviated Ddlr. in the horticultural trade.

== Species ==
As of March 2021, Plants of the World Online accepted the following species:

- Dendrolirium andamanicum (Hook.f.) Schuit., Y.P.Ng & H.A.Pedersen
- Dendrolirium calcareum (V.N.Long & Aver.) Schuit., Y.P.Ng & H.A.Pedersen
- Dendrolirium ferrugineum (Lindl.) A.N.Rao
- Dendrolirium kamlangensis (A.N.Rao) A.N.Rao
- Dendrolirium laniceps (Rchb.f.) Schuit., Y.P.Ng & H.A.Pedersen
- Dendrolirium lanigerum (Seidenf.) H.Jiang
- Dendrolirium lasiopetalum (Willd.) S.C.Chen & J.J.Wood
- Dendrolirium latilabellum (Seidenf.) Schuit., Y.P.Ng & H.A.Pedersen
- Dendrolirium malipoense (Z.J.Liu & S.C.Chen) H.Jiang
- Dendrolirium ornatum Blume
- Dendrolirium sicarium (Lindl.) Schuit., Y.P.Ng & H.A.Pedersen
- Dendrolirium tomentosum (J.Koenig) S.C.Chen & J.J.Wood
