= Bryobium dischorense =

Spotted urchin orchid

Scientific classification
- Kingdom: Plantae
- Clade: Tracheophytes
- Clade: Angiosperms
- Clade: Monocots
- Order: Asparagales
- Family: Orchidaceae
- Subfamily: Epidendroideae
- Genus: Bryobium
- Species: B. dischorense

Binomial name
- Bryobium dischorense (Schltr.) M.A.Clem. & D.L.Jones

Synonyms
- Eria dischorensis Schltr.; Eria intermedia Dockrill; Bryobium intermedium (Dockrill) D.L.Jones & M.A.Clem.

Species of orchid

Bryobium dischorense, commonly known as the spotted urchin orchid, is an epiphytic or lithophytic clump-forming orchid that has fleshy, oval pseudobulbs, each with a single thin leaf and between four and eight cup-shaped, cream-coloured or whitish flowers with red spots. This orchid occurs in New Guinea and Queensland.

== Description ==
Bryobium dischorense is an epiphytic or lithophytic herb that forms dense clumps with oval shaped pseudobulbs 30–40 millimetres (1.2–1.6 in) long and 13–17 millimetres (0.51–0.67 in) wide covered with papery brown bracts when young. Each pseudobulb has a thin, but tough narrow oblong to egg-shaped leaf 70–135 millimetres (2.8–5.3 in) long and 30–35 millimetres (1.2–1.4 in) wide. Between four and eight cream-coloured or whitish, cup-shaped flowers with a few red spots, 6–8 millimetres (0.24–0.31 in) long and 5–6 millimetres (0.20–0.24 in) wide are arranged on a flowering stem 40–80 millimetres (1.6–3.1 in) long. The dorsal sepal is 6–7 millimetres (0.24–0.28 in) long and about 3 millimetres (0.12 in) wide, the lateral sepals a similar length but 5–6 millimetres (0.20–0.24 in) wide. The petals are 4–5 millimetres (0.16–0.20 in) long and about 2 millimetres (0.079 in) wide. The labellum is erect and curved, about 6 millimetres (0.24 in) long and 5 millimetres (0.20 in) wide with three lobes. The side lobes are large and erect and the middle lobe is short and turns downwards. Flowering occurs from October to December.

== Taxonomy and naming ==
The spotted urchin orchid was first formally described in 1912 by Rudolf Schlechter who gave it the name Eria dischorensis and published the description in Repertorium Specierum Novarum Regni Vegetabilis Beihefte. In 2002 Mark Clements and David Jones changed the name to Bryobium dischorense. The specific epithet (dischorense) refers to the type location, which Schlechter referred to as the Dischore Range, now known as the Bowutu Range. The ending -ense being a Latin suffix meaning "denoting place", "locality" or "country".

== Distribution and habitat ==
Bryobium dischorense usually grows on rainforest trees. It is found in New Guinea and in the Whitfield Range in Queensland.
