= Pinalia moluccana =

Scientific classification
- Kingdom: Plantae
- Clade: Embryophytes
- Clade: Tracheophytes
- Clade: Spermatophytes
- Clade: Angiosperms
- Clade: Monocots
- Order: Asparagales
- Family: Orchidaceae
- Subfamily: Epidendroideae
- Genus: Pinalia
- Species: P. moluccana

Binomial name
- Pinalia moluccana (Schltr. & J.J.Sm.) Schuit., Y.P.Ng & H.A.Pedersen

Synonyms
- Eria ambasiensis F.M.Bailey; Eria inornata T.E.Hunt; Eria kingii F.Muell.; Eria linariiflora Rupp; Eria liparoides T.E.Hunt; Eria moluccana Schltr. & J.J.Sm.; Eria mooreana F.Muell. ex Kraenzl.; Eria wollastonii Ridl.; Hymeneria kingii (F.Muell.) M.A.Clem. & D.L.Jones

Species of orchid

Pinalia moluccana, synonym Eria kingii, commonly known as common gremlin orchid, is a plant in the orchid family and is an epiphyte or lithophyte with crowded pseudobulbs, each with three or four thin, channelled leaves. Up to fifty white or cream-coloured, cup-shaped flowers with hairy exteriors are arranged along an erect flowering stem. It is native to areas between Sulawesi and tropical North Queensland, Australia.

== Description ==
Pinalia moluccana is an epiphytic or lithophytic herb with crowded, cone-shaped pseudobulbs 150–250 mm (5.9–9.8 in) long and 30–500 mm (1.2–20 in) wide. Each pseudobulb has three or four dark green, elliptic to egg-shaped, channelled leaves 250–350 mm (9.8–14 in) long and 30–50 mm (1.2–2.0 in) wide. Between fifteen and fifty white or cream-coloured, cup-shaped, resupinate flowers 6–8 mm (0.24–0.31 in) long and 5–7 mm (0.20–0.28 in) wide are arranged along a stiffly erect flowering stem 100–300 mm (3.9–12 in) long. The flowers are hairy on the outside. The dorsal sepal is 6–7 mm (0.24–0.28 in) long and 3–4 mm (0.12–0.16 in) wide, the lateral sepals 4.5–7 mm (0.18–0.28 in) long and wide and the petals are 5–6 mm (0.20–0.24 in) long and about 3 mm (0.12 in) wide. The labellum is about 5 mm (0.20 in) long and 4 mm (0.16 in) wide with three lobes. The side lobes are erect and the middle lobe turns downwards and has a ridge along its midline. Flowering occurs between August and October in Australia.

== Taxonomy and naming ==
Eria kingii was first formally described in 1877 by Ferdinand von Mueller who published the description in Southern Science Record. Mueller "gladly dedicated it to Mr. King" who supplied the type specimen from his conservatory. "Mr. King" is further identified earlier in the same article as "Arthur (Septimus) King, Esq., son of ... Admiral Ph. Parker King" Eria moluccana was first formally described in 1905 by Rudolf Schlechter and Johannes Jacobus Smith. Plants of the World Online regards both names as synonyms of Pinalia moluccana.

== Distribution and habitat ==
Common gremlin orchid grows in rocks and trees in humid situations, often on branches overhanging water. It is found in Sulawesi, the Maluku Islands, New Guinea, the Solomon Islands and Queensland, Australia. In Queensland it is found from the Iron Range to the Tully River.
