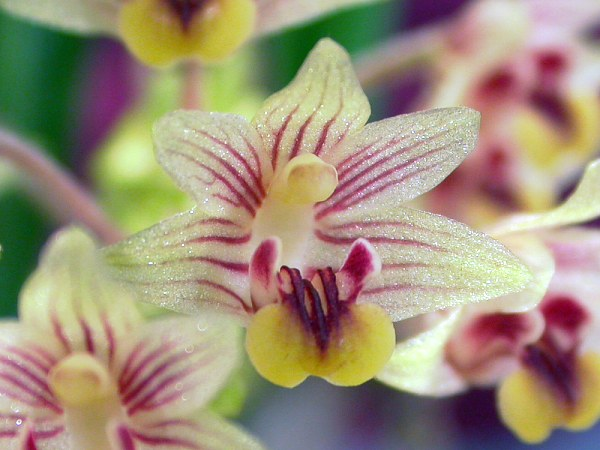
- Pinalia amica

Scientific classification
- Kingdom: Plantae
- Clade: Tracheophytes
- Clade: Angiosperms
- Clade: Monocots
- Order: Asparagales
- Family: Orchidaceae
- Subfamily: Epidendroideae
- Tribe: Podochileae
- Subtribe: Eriinae
- Genus: Pinalia; Lindl.

Synonyms
- Hymeneria (Lindl.) M.A.Clem. & D.L.Jones; Urostachya (Lindl.) Brieger

= Pinalia =

Genus of orchids

Pinalia, commonly known as gremlin orchids, is a genus of flowering plants in the family Orchidaceae. Orchids in this genus are large epiphytic or lithophytic plants with prominent pseudobulbs, each with up to three thin, flat leaves and cup-shaped, relatively short-lived flowers with scale-like brown hairs on the outside. There are about 120 species occurring from tropical to subtropical Asia to the south-west Pacific.

== Description ==
Orchids in the genus Pinalia are epiphytic or lithophytic, rarely terrestrial herbs with prominent, fleshy pseudobulbs that are covered with papery brown bracts when young. Each pseudobulb has up to three thin, leathery, linear to lance-shaped leaves. The flowers are resupinate, usually cup-shaped and last for a few days. The dorsal sepal is narrower than the lateral sepals which are attached at their base to the column to form a small ledge. The labellum is hinged to the base of the column and has three relatively small lobes.

== Distribution ==
Orchids in the genus Pinalia occur in China (about 17 species), Japan, the Ryukyu Islands, Taiwan, the Indian subcontinent, the Andaman Islands, Laos, Myanmar, the Nicobar Islands, Thailand, Vietnam, Borneo, Java, the Lesser Sunda Islands, Peninsular Malaysia, the Maluku Islands, the Philippines, Sulawesi, Sumatra, New Guinea, the Solomon Islands, Queensland (Australia) and Samoa.

== Taxonomy and naming ==
The genus Pinali was first formally described in 1826 by John Lindley who published the description in Orchidearum Sceletos. The name Pinalia is based on an unpublished name suggested by Francis Buchanan-Hamilton, derived from a Nepalese word meaning a type of forest yam.

=== Species list ===
Species accepted by Plants of the World Online as of February 2021:

- Pinalia acervata (Lindl.) Kuntze
- Pinalia acutifolia (Lindl.) Kuntze
- Pinalia acutissima (Rchb.f.) Ormerod
- Pinalia affinis (Griff.) Ormerod
- Pinalia amica (Rchb.f.) Kuntze
- Pinalia amplectens (J.J.Sm.) Schuit., Y.P.Ng & H.A.Pedersen
- Pinalia ancorifera (J.J.Sm.) Schuit., Y.P.Ng & H.A.Pedersen
- Pinalia angustifolia J.J.Wood
- Pinalia annapurnensis (L.R.Shakya & M.R.Shrestha) Schuit., Y.P.Ng & H.A.Pedersen
- Pinalia anomala (Schltr.) Schuit., Y.P.Ng & H.A.Pedersen
- Pinalia apertiflora (Summerh.) A.N.Rao
- Pinalia appendiculata (Blume) Kuntze
- Pinalia atrovinosa (Carr) Schuit., Y.P.Ng & H.A.Pedersen
- Pinalia baeuerleniana (Kraenzl.) Ormerod
- Pinalia baniae (Bajrach., L.R.Shakya & Chettri) Schuit., Y.P.Ng & H.A.Pedersen
- Pinalia barbifrons (Kraenzl.) W.Suarez & Cootes
- Pinalia bengkulensis (J.J.Sm.) Schuit., Y.P.Ng & H.A.Pedersen
- Pinalia bhutanica (Bajrach. & K.K.Shrestha) Schuit., Y.P.Ng & H.A.Pedersen
- Pinalia bicolor (Lindl.) Kuntze
- Pinalia biglandulosa (J.J.Sm.) Schuit., Y.P.Ng & H.A.Pedersen
- Pinalia bilobulata (Seidenf.) Schuit., Y.P.Ng & H.A.Pedersen
- Pinalia bipunctata (Lindl.) Kuntze
- Pinalia bogoriensis (J.J.Sm.) Schuit., Y.P.Ng & H.A.Pedersen
- Pinalia bractescens (Lindl.) Kuntze
- Pinalia braddonii (Rolfe) Schuit., Y.P.Ng & H.A.Pedersen
- Pinalia brownei (Braid) Ormerod
- Pinalia carnicolor (Ames) W.Suarez & Cootes
- Pinalia carnosula (J.J.Sm.) Schuit., Y.P.Ng & H.A.Pedersen
- Pinalia celebica (Rolfe) Schuit., Y.P.Ng & H.A.Pedersen
- Pinalia cepifolia (Ridl.) J.J.Wood
- Pinalia chrysocardium (Schltr.) Schuit., Y.P.Ng & H.A.Pedersen
- Pinalia clavata (Holttum) Schuit., Y.P.Ng & H.A.Pedersen
- Pinalia cochinchinensis (Gagnep.) Schuit., Y.P.Ng & H.A.Pedersen
- Pinalia compacta (Ames) W.Suarez & Cootes
- Pinalia compressiflora P.T.Ong, P.O'Byrne & Gokusing
- Pinalia concolor (C.S.P.Parish & Rchb.f.) Kuntze
- Pinalia conferta (S.C.Chen & Z.H.Tsi) S.C.Chen & J.J.Wood
- Pinalia connata (J.Joseph, S.N.Hegde & Abbar.) Ormerod & E.W.Wood
- Pinalia consanguinea (J.J.Sm.) Schuit., Y.P.Ng & H.A.Pedersen
- Pinalia curranii (Leav.) W.Suarez & Cootes
- Pinalia cycloglossa (Schltr.) Ormerod
- Pinalia cylindrostachya (Ames) W.Suarez & Cootes
- Pinalia dagamensis (Ames) W.Suarez & Cootes
- Pinalia dasypus (Rchb.f.) Kuntze
- Pinalia daymaniana Ormerod
- Pinalia deliana (J.J.Sm.) Schuit., Y.P.Ng & H.A.Pedersen
- Pinalia densa (Ridl.) W.Suarez & Cootes
- Pinalia distans P.O'Byrne & Gokusing
- Pinalia diversicolor (V.N.Long & Aver.) Schuit., Y.P.Ng & H.A.Pedersen
- Pinalia djaratensis (Schltr.) Schuit., Y.P.Ng & H.A.Pedersen
- Pinalia donnaiensis (Gagnep.) S.C.Chen & J.J.Wood
- Pinalia dura (Kraenzl.) Schuit., Y.P.Ng & H.A.Pedersen
- Pinalia earine (Ridl.) Schuit., Y.P.Ng & H.A.Pedersen
- Pinalia elata (Hook.f.) Kuntze
- Pinalia erecta (Blume) Kuntze
- Pinalia eriopsidobulbon (C.S.P.Parish & Rchb.f.) Kuntze
- Pinalia erosula (J.J.Sm.) Schuit., Y.P.Ng & H.A.Pedersen
- Pinalia eurostachys (Ridl.) Schuit., Y.P.Ng & H.A.Pedersen
- Pinalia euryloba (Schltr.) Schuit., Y.P.Ng & H.A.Pedersen
- Pinalia excavata (Lindl.) Kuntze
- Pinalia fitzalanii (F.Muell.) Kuntze
- Pinalia flavescens (Blume) Kuntze
- Pinalia floribunda (Lindl.) Kuntze
- Pinalia formosana (Rolfe) Ormerod
- Pinalia glabra (Schltr.) Ormerod
- Pinalia globulifera (Seidenf.) A.N.Rao
- Pinalia gracilicaulis (Kraenzl.) Schuit., Y.P.Ng & H.A.Pedersen
- Pinalia graciliscapa (Rolfe) J.J.Wood
- Pinalia graminifolia (Lindl.) Kuntze
- Pinalia grandicaulis (Aver.) Schuit., Y.P.Ng & H.A.Pedersen
- Pinalia hosei (Rendle) Schuit., Y.P.Ng & H.A.Pedersen
- Pinalia hutchinsoniana (Ames) W.Suarez & Cootes
- Pinalia ignea (Rchb.f.) Schuit., Y.P.Ng & H.A.Pedersen
- Pinalia japonica (Maxim.) Ormerod
- Pinalia jarensis (Ames) W.Suarez & Cootes
- Pinalia jimcootesii Naive & Ormerod
- Pinalia lamonganensis (Rchb.f.) Schuit., Y.P.Ng & H.A.Pedersen
- Pinalia lancilabris (Schltr.) Ormerod
- Pinalia latiuscula (Ames & C.Schweinf.) J.J.Wood
- Pinalia ledermannii (Schltr.) Schuit., Y.P.Ng & H.A.Pedersen
- Pinalia leucantha Kuntze
- Pinalia lineata (Lindl.) Kuntze
- Pinalia lineoligera (Rchb.f.) Ormerod
- Pinalia longicruris (Leav.) W.Suarez & Cootes
- Pinalia longilabris (Lindl.) W.Suarez & Cootes
- Pinalia longlingensis (S.C.Chen) S.C.Chen & J.J.Wood
- Pinalia lyonii (Leav.) W.Suarez & Cootes
- Pinalia maboroensis (Schltr.) Ormerod
- Pinalia macera (Ames) W.Suarez & Cootes
- Pinalia mafuluensis Ormerod
- Pinalia maingayi (Hook.f.) Kuntze
- Pinalia maquilingensis (Ames) W.Suarez & Cootes
- Pinalia meghasaniensis (S.Misra) Schuit., Y.P.Ng & H.A.Pedersen
- Pinalia mentaweiensis (J.J.Sm.) Schuit., Y.P.Ng & H.A.Pedersen
- Pinalia merapiensis (Schltr.) Schuit., Y.P.Ng & H.A.Pedersen
- Pinalia merguensis (Lindl.) Kuntze
- Pinalia merrittii (Ames) W.Suarez & Cootes
- Pinalia microchila (Ames) W.Suarez & Cootes
- Pinalia microglossa (Schltr.) Ormerod
- Pinalia minahassae (Schltr.) Schuit., Y.P.Ng & H.A.Pedersen
- Pinalia moluccana (Schltr. & J.J.Sm.) Schuit., Y.P.Ng & H.A.Pedersen
- Pinalia multiflora (Blume) Kuntze
- Pinalia murkelensis (J.J.Sm.) Schuit., Y.P.Ng & H.A.Pedersen
- Pinalia myristiciformis (Hook.) Kuntze
- Pinalia mysorensis (Lindl.) Kuntze
- Pinalia nielsenii Cootes, Cabactulan & M.Leon
- Pinalia obesa (Lindl.) Kuntze
- Pinalia obscura (Aver.) Schuit., Y.P.Ng & H.A.Pedersen
- Pinalia obvia (W.W.Sm.) S.C.Chen & J.J.Wood
- Pinalia occidentalis (Seidenf.) Schuit., Y.P.Ng & H.A.Pedersen
- Pinalia ochracea (Rolfe) Schuit., Y.P.Ng & H.A.Pedersen
- Pinalia oligotricha (Schltr.) T.C.Hsu
- Pinalia opeatoloba (Schltr.) Schuit., Y.P.Ng & H.A.Pedersen
- Pinalia oreogena (Schltr.) Schuit., Y.P.Ng & H.A.Pedersen
- Pinalia ovata (Lindl.) W.Suarez & Cootes
- Pinalia pachyphylla (Aver.) S.C.Chen & J.J.Wood
- Pinalia pachystachya (Lindl.) Kuntze
- Pinalia palmifolia (Ridl.) Schuit., Y.P.Ng & H.A.Pedersen
- Pinalia pandurata (Schltr.) Ormerod
- Pinalia petiolata (J.J.Sm.) Schuit., Y.P.Ng & H.A.Pedersen
- Pinalia philippinensis (Ames) W.Suarez & Cootes
- Pinalia phreatiopsis P.O'Byrne, J.J.Verm. & P.K.F.Leong
- Pinalia piruensis (J.J.Sm.) Schuit., Y.P.Ng & H.A.Pedersen
- Pinalia pokharensis (Bajrach., Subedi & K.K.Shrestha) Schuit., Y.P.Ng & H.A.Pedersen
- Pinalia polystachya (A.Rich.) Kuntze
- Pinalia polyura (Lindl.) Kuntze
- Pinalia porphyroglossa (Kraenzl.) Schuit., Y.P.Ng & H.A.Pedersen
- Pinalia praecox (Aver.) Schuit., Y.P.Ng & H.A.Pedersen
- Pinalia profusa (Lindl.) Kuntze
- Pinalia pumila (Lindl.) Kuntze
- Pinalia quinquangularis (J.J.Sm.) Ormerod
- Pinalia quinquelamellosa (Tang & F.T.Wang) S.C.Chen & J.J.Wood
- Pinalia ramosa (Ames) W.Suarez & Cootes
- Pinalia ramulosa (Ridl.) Schuit., Y.P.Ng & H.A.Pedersen
- Pinalia recurvata (Hook.f.) Kuntze
- Pinalia reticosa (Wight) Kuntze
- Pinalia rhodoptera (Rchb.f.) W.Suarez & Cootes
- Pinalia rhynchostyloides (O'Brien) Y.P.Ng & P.J.Cribb
- Pinalia rimannii (Rchb.f.) Kuntze
- Pinalia ringens (Rchb.f.) Kuntze
- Pinalia rolfei Schuit., Y.P.Ng & H.A.Pedersen
- Pinalia saccifera (Hook.f.) Kuntze
- Pinalia scotiifolia (J.J.Sm.) Schuit., Y.P.Ng & H.A.Pedersen
- Pinalia semirepens Ormerod
- Pinalia serrulata Ormerod
- Pinalia shanensis (King & Pantl.) Ormerod
- Pinalia sharmae (H.J.Chowdhery, G.S.Giri & G.D.Pal) A.N.Rao
- Pinalia shiuyingiana Ormerod & E.W.Wood
- Pinalia simondii (Gagnep.) Schuit., Y.P.Ng & H.A.Pedersen
- Pinalia simplex (Seidenf.) Schuit., Y.P.Ng & H.A.Pedersen
- Pinalia sopoetanica (Schltr.) Schuit., Y.P.Ng & H.A.Pedersen
- Pinalia sordida (Ridl.) Schuit., Y.P.Ng & H.A.Pedersen
- Pinalia spicata (D.Don) S.C.Chen & J.J.Wood
- Pinalia sublobulata Ormerod
- Pinalia sumbawensis (Rchb.f.) Schuit., Y.P.Ng & H.A.Pedersen
- Pinalia sundaica (J.J.Sm.) Schuit., Y.P.Ng & H.A.Pedersen
- Pinalia sutepensis (Rolfe ex Downie) Schuit., Y.P.Ng & H.A.Pedersen
- Pinalia szetschuanica (Schltr.) S.C.Chen & J.J.Wood
- Pinalia taylorii (Ames) W.Suarez & Cootes
- Pinalia tenuiflora (Ridl.) J.J.Wood
- Pinalia toxopei (J.J.Sm.) Schuit., Y.P.Ng & H.A.Pedersen
- Pinalia tricolor (Thwaites) Kuntze
- Pinalia triloba (Ridl.) Schuit., Y.P.Ng & H.A.Pedersen
- Pinalia trilophota (Lindl. ex B.D.Jacks.) Ormerod
- Pinalia truncicola (Schltr.) Ormerod
- Pinalia vagans (Schltr.) Ormerod
- Pinalia vaginifera (J.J.Sm.) Schuit., Y.P.Ng & H.A.Pedersen
- Pinalia versicolor (J.J.Sm.) Schuit., Y.P.Ng & H.A.Pedersen
- Pinalia wildgrubeana (P.O'Byrne & J.J.Verm.) Schuit., Y.P.Ng & H.A.Pedersen
- Pinalia wildiana (Rolfe ex Downie) Schuit., Y.P.Ng & H.A.Pedersen
- Pinalia woodiana (Ames) W.Suarez & Cootes
- Pinalia xanthocheila (Ridl.) W.Suarez & Cootes
- Pinalia yunnanensis (S.C.Chen & Z.H.Tsi) S.C.Chen & J.J.Wood
