= Bryobium irukandjianum =

Small urchin orchid

Scientific classification
- Kingdom: Plantae
- Clade: Tracheophytes
- Clade: Angiosperms
- Clade: Monocots
- Order: Asparagales
- Family: Orchidaceae
- Subfamily: Epidendroideae
- Genus: Bryobium
- Species: B. irukandjianum

Binomial name
- Bryobium irukandjianum (St.Cloud) M.A.Clem. & D.L.Jones

Synonyms
- Eria irukandjiana St.Cloud; Eria johnsonii D.L.Jones

Species of orchid

Bryobium irukandjianum, commonly known as small urchin orchid, is an epiphytic or lithophytic clump-forming orchid that has small, fleshy green pseudobulbs, each with two or three leaves and between seven and twelve small, short-lived, whitish to dull pink flowers. This orchid only occurs in tropical North Queensland.

== Description ==
Bryobium irukandjianum is an epiphytic or lithophytic herb that forms small, dense clumps with small, oval pseudobulbs 8–12 millimetres (0.31–0.47 in) long and wide. Each pseudobulb has two or three linear to lance-shaped leaves 50–120 millimetres (2.0–4.7 in) long and 6–10 millimetres (0.24–0.39 in) wide. Between seven and twelve short-lived, self-pollinating, whitish to dull pink, resupinate flowers about 3 millimetres (0.12 in) long and wide are arranged on a flowering stem 10–15 millimetres (0.39–0.59 in) long. The sepal and petals are about 2 millimetres (0.079 in) long and 0.5 millimetres (0.020 in) wide. The labellum is about 1.5 millimetres (0.059 in) long and 1 millimetre (0.039 in) wide with its tip turned down. Flowering occurs from October to December.

== Taxonomy and naming ==
Small urchin orchid was first formally described in 1955 by Stanley F. Goessling-St Cloud who gave it the name Eria irukandjiana and published the description in The North Queensland Naturalist. In 2002 Mark Clements and David Jones changed the name to Bryobium irukandjianum. The specific epithet (irukandjianum) refers to the Irukandji people who lived in the area where this orchid grows. The ending -anum is a Latin suffix meaning "pertaining to" or "belonging to".

== Distribution and habitat ==
Bryobium irukandjianum mostly grows on the upper branches of trees in humid situations. It is found in Queensland between the McIlwraith Range and the Atherton Tableland.
