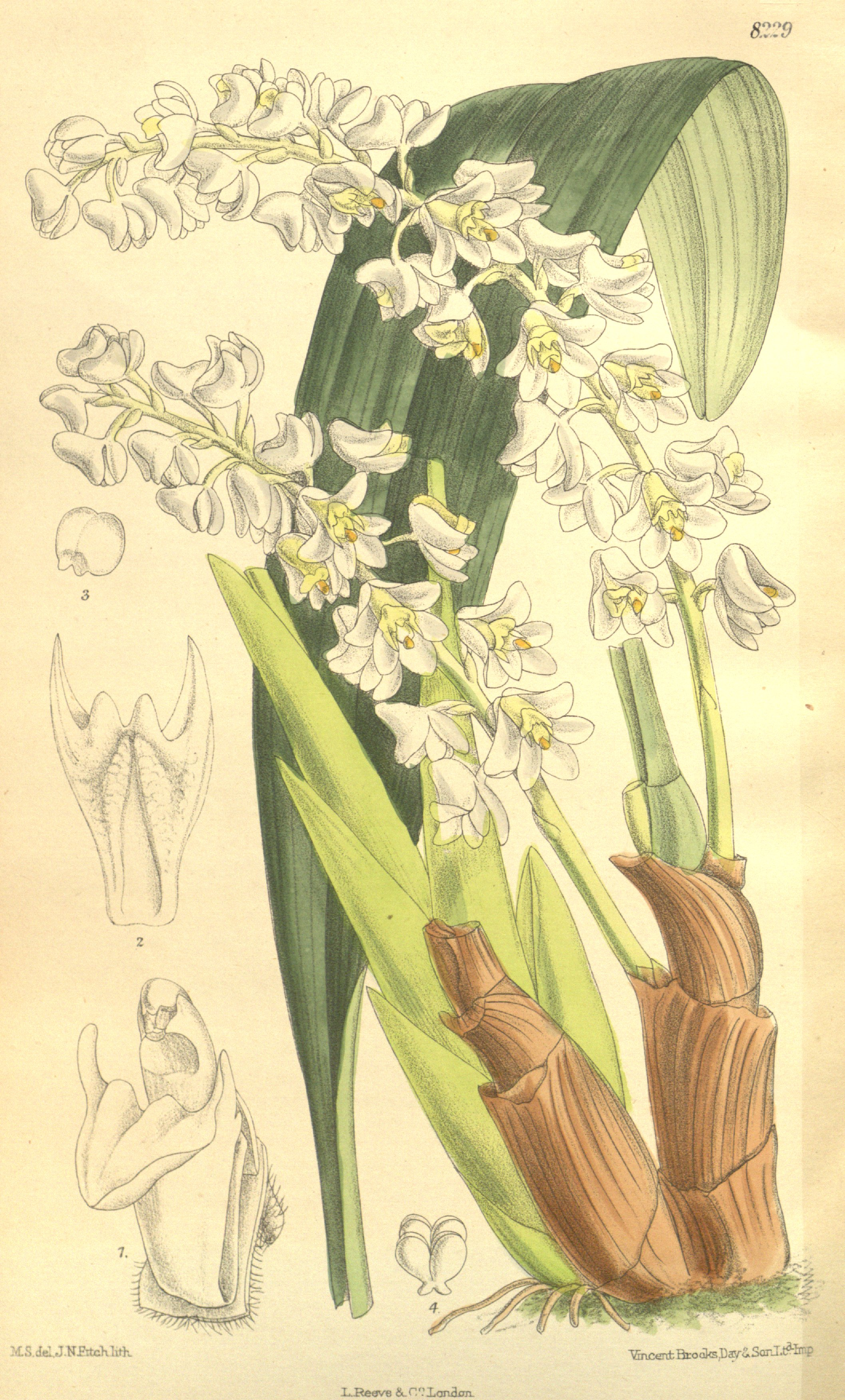
- Illustration by John Nugent Fitch of Bryobium hyacinthoides from Curtis's Botanical Magazine

Scientific classification
- Kingdom: Plantae
- Clade: Tracheophytes
- Clade: Angiosperms
- Clade: Monocots
- Order: Asparagales
- Family: Orchidaceae
- Subfamily: Epidendroideae
- Tribe: Podochileae
- Subtribe: Eriinae
- Genus: Bryobium; Lindl.

Synonyms
- Notheria P.O'Byrne & J.J.Verm.

= Bryobium =

Genus of orchids

Bryobium, commonly known as urchin orchids or 藓兰属 (xian lan shu), is a genus of flowering plants in the family Orchidaceae. Orchids in this genus are epiphytic or lithophytic plants with large, fleshy pseudobulbs, each with up to three leathery leaves and small, often hairy flowers. These orchids are found from tropical Asia to northern Australia.

== Description ==
Orchids in the genus are epiphytic or lithophytic herbs with thread-like roots and relatively large, fleshy pseudobulbs that are usually covered by papery bracts when young. Each pseudobulb has up to three flat, usually leathery leaves. The flowers are usually white, cream-coloured or pinkish, do not open widely and last for up to a few days. The dorsal sepal is free but the lateral sepals are fused to the base of the column. The petals are free from each other and usually smaller than the sepals. The labellum often has three lobes, in which case the side lobes are erect.

== Taxonomy and naming ==
The genus Bryobium was first formally described in 1836 by John Lindley who published the description in A natural system of botany, or, A systematic view of the organization, natural affinities, and geographical distribution, of the whole vegetable kingdom. The name Bryobium is derived from the Ancient Greek words bryon meaning "moss" and bios meaning "life", an apparent reference to the habit of plants in this genus.

=== Species list ===
Bryobium species accepted by the Plants of the World Online as of February 2021:

- Bryobium atrorubens (Schltr.) Schuit., Y.P.Ng & H.A.Pedersen
- Bryobium bicristatum (Blume) Schuit., Y.P.Ng & H.A.Pedersen
- Bryobium cordiferum (Schltr.) Schuit., Y.P.Ng & H.A.Pedersen
- Bryobium diaphanum (P.O'Byrne & J.J.Verm.) Schuit., Y.P.Ng & H.A.Pedersen
- Bryobium dischorense (Schltr.) M.A.Clem. & D.L.Jones – spotted urchin orchid (New Guinea, Queensland)
- Bryobium eriaeoides (F.M.Bailey) M.A.Clem. & D.L.Jones – brittle urchin orchid (New Guinea, Queensland)
- Bryobium hyacinthoides (Blume) Y.P.Ng & P.J.Cribb
- Bryobium irukandjianum (St.Cloud) M.A.Clem. & D.L.Jones – small urchin orchid (Queensland)
- Bryobium kawengicum (Schltr.) Schuit., Y.P.Ng & H.A.Pedersen
- Bryobium lancifolium (Hook.f.) Schuit., Y.P.Ng & H.A.Pedersen
- Bryobium lanuginosum (J.J.Wood) Schuit., Y.P.Ng & H.A.Pedersen
- Bryobium leavittii (Kraenzl.) Schuit., Y.P.Ng & H.A.Pedersen
- Bryobium montanum (Schltr.) Schuit., Y.P.Ng & H.A.Pedersen
- Bryobium moultonii (Ridl.) Schuit., Y.P.Ng & H.A.Pedersen
- Bryobium pudicum (Ridl.) Y.P.Ng & P.J.Cribb
- Bryobium puguahaanense (Ames) Schuit., Y.P.Ng & H.A.Pedersen
- Bryobium pullum (Schltr.) Schuit., Y.P.Ng & H.A.Pedersen
- Bryobium punctatum (J.J.Sm.) Schuit., Y.P.Ng & H.A.Pedersen
- Bryobium queenslandicum (T.E.Hunt) M.A.Clem. & D.L.Jones – dingy urchin orchid (Queensland)
- Bryobium rendovaense J.J.Wood
- Bryobium retusum (Blume) Y.P.Ng & P.J.Cribb – Christmas Island urchin orchid (Borneo, Java, Lesser Sunda Islands, New Guinea, Solomon Islands, Christmas Island)
- Bryobium rhizophoreti (Schltr.) Schuit., Y.P.Ng & H.A.Pedersen
- Bryobium rubiferum (J.J.Sm.) Schuit., Y.P.Ng & H.A.Pedersen
- Bryobium senile (Ames) Schuit., Y.P.Ng & H.A.Pedersen
- Bryobium subclausum (Schltr.) Schuit., Y.P.Ng & H.A.Pedersen
- Bryobium tridens (Ames) Schuit., Y.P.Ng & H.A.Pedersen
- Bryobium ventricosum (Leav.) Schuit., Y.P.Ng & H.A.Pedersen

== Distribution and habitat ==
Orchids in the genus Bryobium grow on the upper parts of rainforest trees or on rocks and boulders. They occur in China, the Indian subcontinent, Cambodia, Laos, Vietnam, Borneo, Java, the Lesser Sunda Islands, Peninsula Malaysia, Sulawesi, Sumatra, Christmas Island, New Guinea, the Solomon Islands, Queensland, Australia and New Caledonia.
