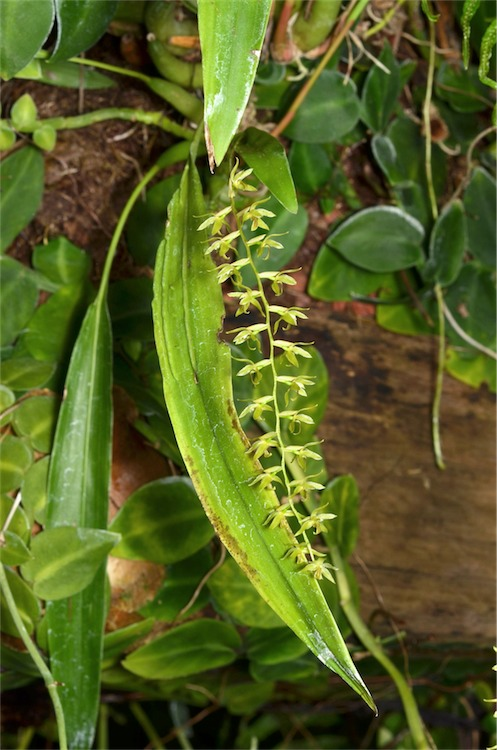
- Bryobium queenslandicum in the Australian National Botanic Gardens

Scientific classification
- Kingdom: Plantae
- Clade: Tracheophytes
- Clade: Angiosperms
- Clade: Monocots
- Order: Asparagales
- Family: Orchidaceae
- Subfamily: Epidendroideae
- Genus: Bryobium
- Species: B. queenslandicum

Binomial name
- Bryobium queenslandicum (T.E.Hunt) M.A.Clem. & D.L.Jones

Synonyms
- Eria queenslandica T.E.Hunt

= Bryobium queenslandicum =

Dingy urchin orchid

Species of orchid

Bryobium queenslandicum, commonly known as the dingy urchin orchid, is an epiphytic or lithophytic clump-forming orchid that has cylindrical, fleshy green pseudobulbs, each with two leaves and between three and twelve small, self-pollinating, cream-coloured or pinkish flowers. This orchid only occurs in tropical North Queensland.

== Description ==
Bryobium queenslandicum is an epiphytic or lithophytic herb that forms dense clumps with crowded, cylindrical pseudobulbs 40–60 millimetres (1.6–2.4 in) long and 8–12 millimetres (0.31–0.47 in) wide. Each pseudobulb has two lance-shaped to egg-shaped leaves 60–120 millimetres (2.4–4.7 in) long and 16–20 millimetres (0.63–0.79 in) wide. Between three and twelve cream-coloured or pinkish, resupinate flowers about 3 millimetres (0.12 in) long and wide are arranged on a flowering stem 20–40 millimetres (0.79–1.6 in) long. The flowers are cup-shaped, self-pollinating and hairy on the outside. The sepal and petals are about 3 millimetres (0.12 in) long and 1.5–2 millimetres (0.059–0.079 in) wide. The labellum is about 2 millimetres (0.079 in) long and 1.5 millimetres (0.059 in) wide with three lobes. The side lobes are erect and the middle lobe turns downward with two ridges near the base. Flowering occurs from August to October.

== Taxonomy and naming ==
The dingy urchin orchid was first formally described in 1948 by Trevor Edgar Hunt who gave it the name Eria queenslandica and published the description in The North Queensland Naturalist. The type specimen was collected by John Henry Wilkie who collected in on Mount Bellenden Ker. In 2002 Mark Clements and David Jones changed the name to Bryobium queenslandicum.

== Distribution and habitat ==
Bryobium queenslandicum grows on trees and rocks in rainforest between the McIlwraith Range and the Tully River.
