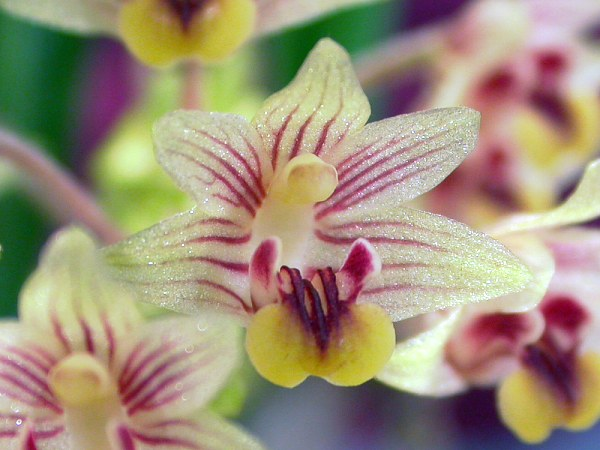

Scientific classification
- Kingdom: Plantae
- Clade: Tracheophytes
- Clade: Angiosperms
- Clade: Monocots
- Order: Asparagales
- Family: Orchidaceae
- Subfamily: Epidendroideae
- Genus: Pinalia
- Species: P. amica

Binomial name
- Pinalia amica (Rchb.f.) Kuntze

Synonyms
- Eria amica Rchb.f.; Eria andersonii Hook.f.; Eria confusa Hook.f.; Eria hypomelana Hayata; Octomeria excavata Wall. ex Hook.f.; Pinalia andersonii (Hook.f.) Kuntze; Pinalia confusa (Hook.f.) Kuntze

= Pinalia amica =

Species of orchid

Pinalia amica is a species of orchid.
