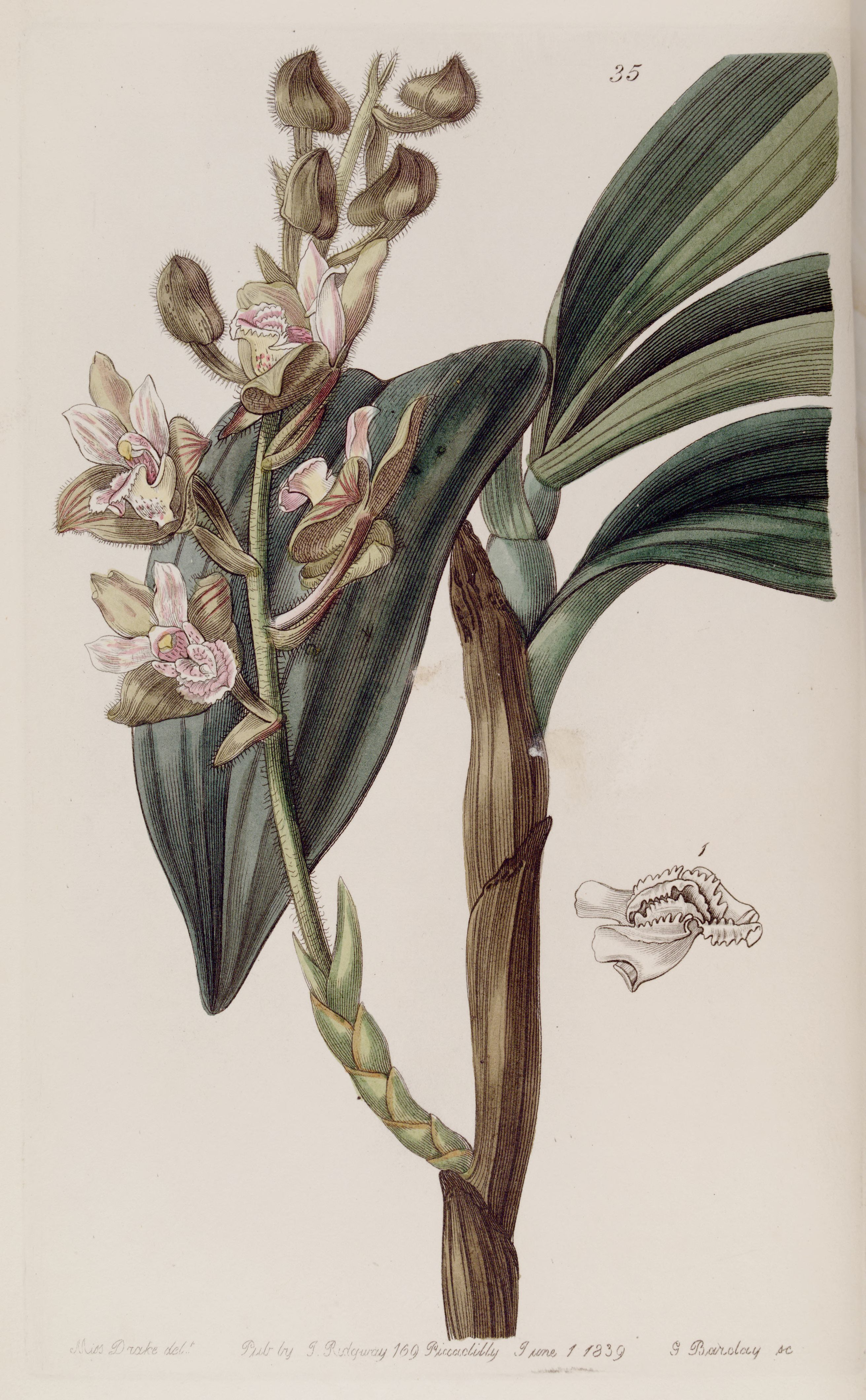
- 1839 illustration from Edwards's Botanical Register

Scientific classification
- Kingdom: Plantae
- Clade: Tracheophytes
- Clade: Angiosperms
- Clade: Monocots
- Order: Asparagales
- Family: Orchidaceae
- Subfamily: Epidendroideae
- Genus: Dendrolirium
- Species: D. ferrugineum

Binomial name
- Dendrolirium ferrugineum Lindl. A.N.Rao

Synonyms
- Eria ferruginea Lindl.; Pinalia ferruginea (Lindl.) Kuntze; Trichotosia ferruginea (Lindl.) Kraenzl.

= Dendrolirium ferrugineum =

Species of orchid

Dendrolirium ferrugineum, synonym Eria ferruginea, is a species of orchid. It is native to Bhutan and Assam in the eastern Himalayas.
