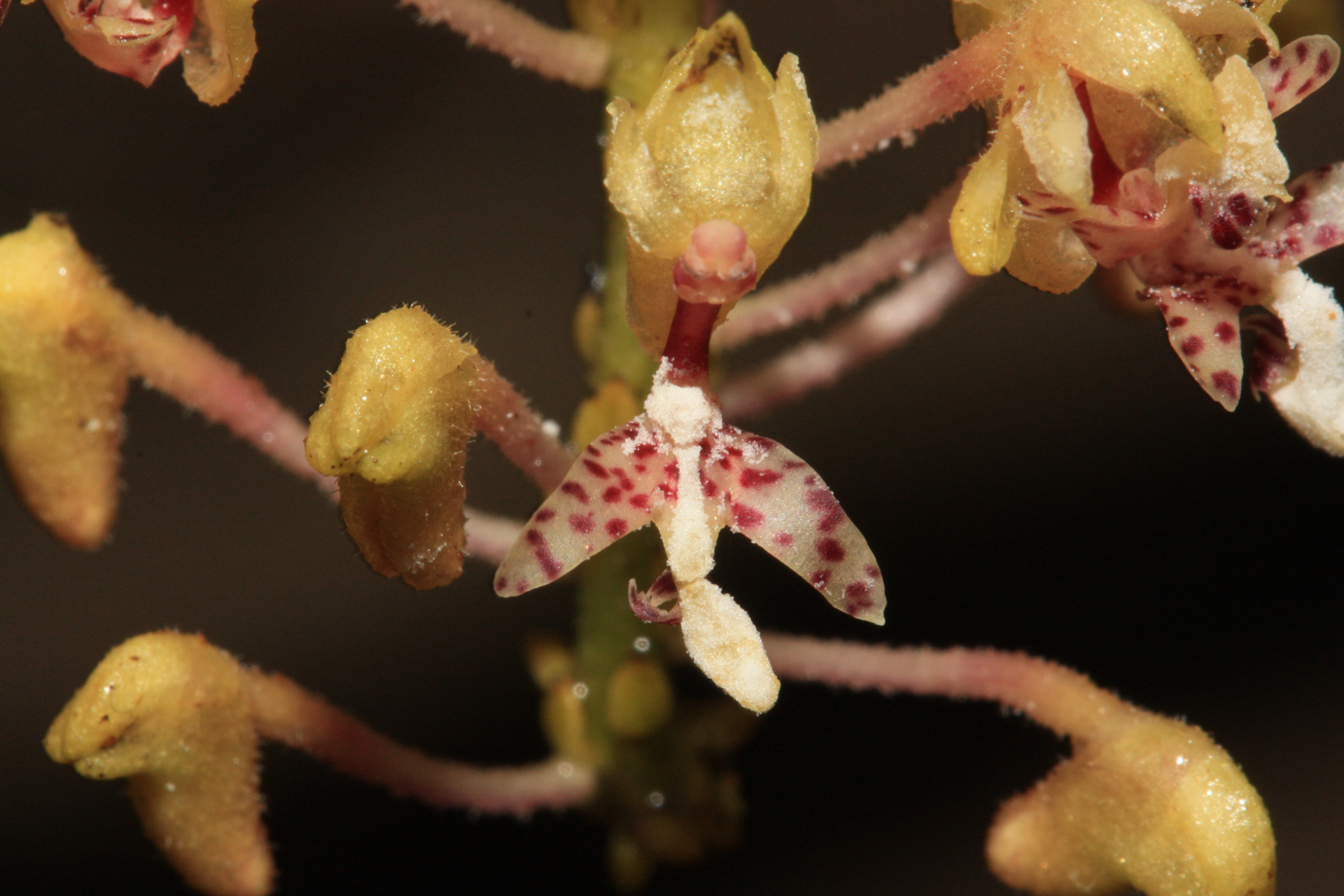
- Flower of Mycaranthes oblitterata found in Mindanao island

Scientific classification
- Kingdom: Plantae
- Clade: Tracheophytes
- Clade: Angiosperms
- Clade: Monocots
- Order: Asparagales
- Family: Orchidaceae
- Subfamily: Epidendroideae
- Genus: Mycaranthes
- Species: M. oblitterata

Binomial name
- Mycaranthes oblitterata Blume (1825)

Synonyms
- Mycaranthes major; Mycaranthes abbreviata; Mycaranthes ridleyi

= Mycaranthes oblitterata =

Species of orchid

Mycaranthes oblitterata is an orchid found in Borneo and the Moluccas.
