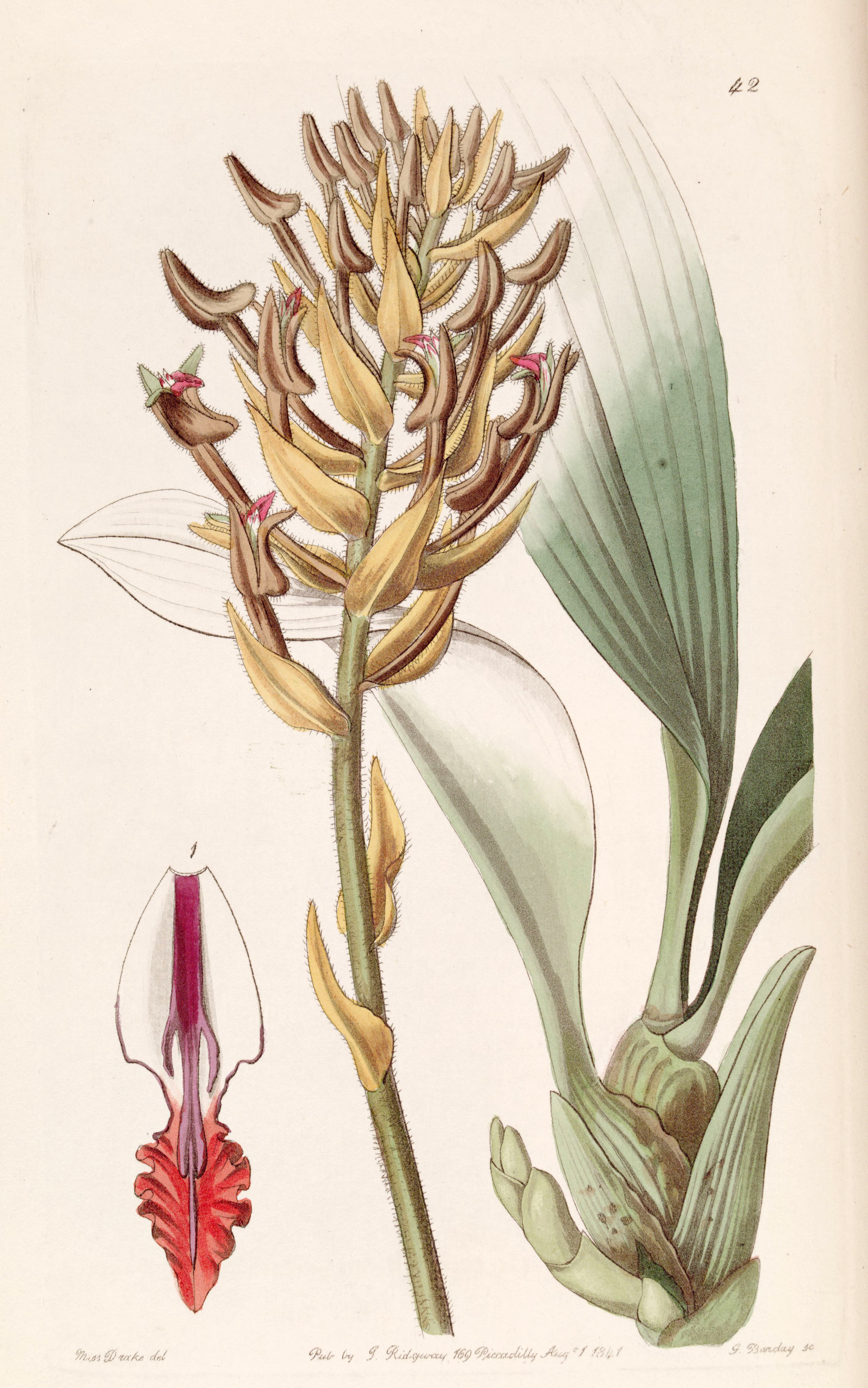
- 1841 illustration from Edwards's Botanical Register

Scientific classification
- Kingdom: Plantae
- Clade: Tracheophytes
- Clade: Angiosperms
- Clade: Monocots
- Order: Asparagales
- Family: Orchidaceae
- Subfamily: Epidendroideae
- Genus: Dendrolirium
- Species: D. ornatum

Binomial name
- Dendrolirium ornatum Blume

Synonyms
- Eria armeniaca Lindl.; Eria ornata (Blume) Lindl.; Pinalia ornata (Blume) Kuntze; Trias ornata (Blume) Mason

= Dendrolirium ornatum =

Species of orchid

Dendrolirium ornatum is a species of orchid. It is native to Thailand, Malaysia, Indonesia and the Philippines.
