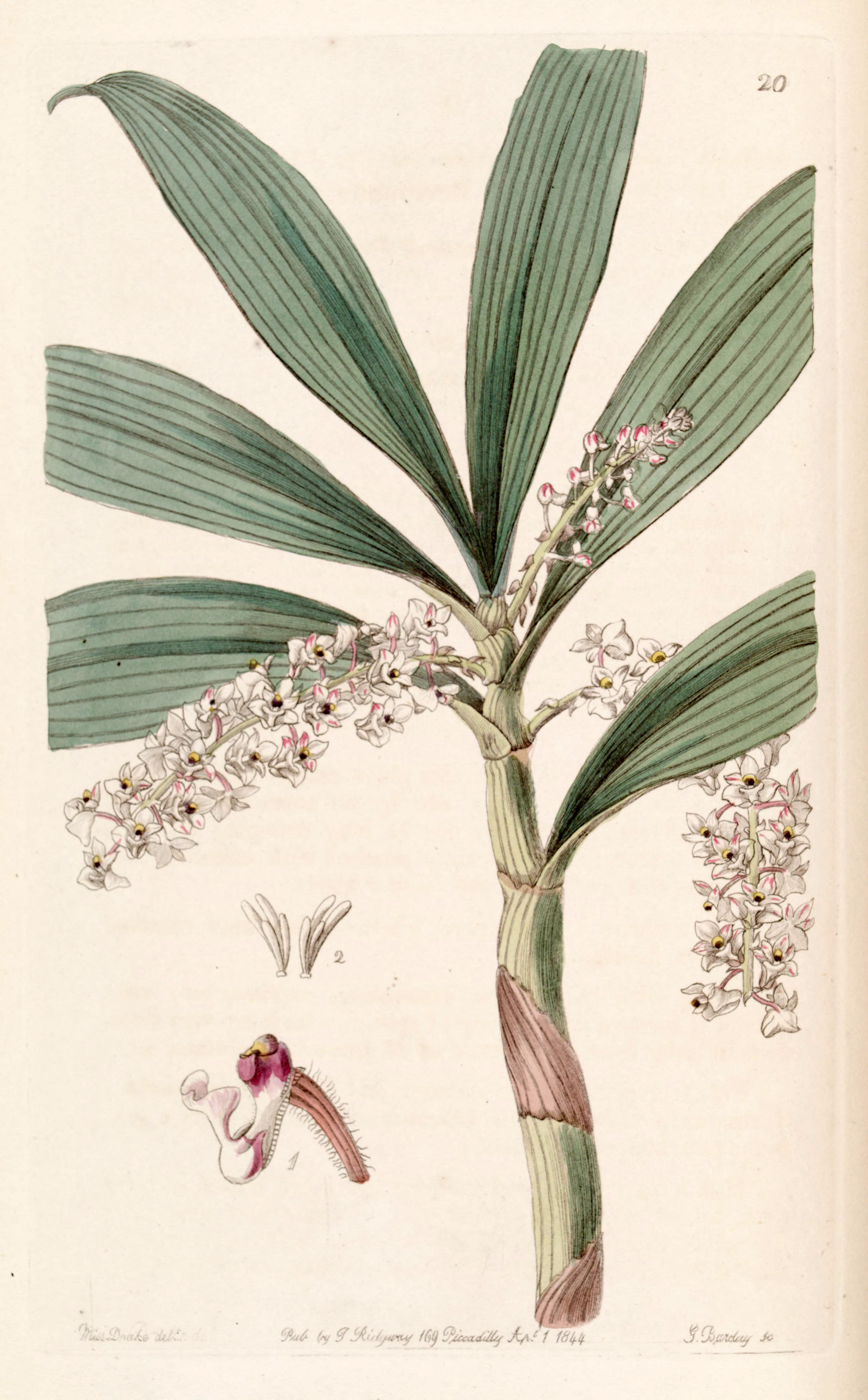
- Illustration in Edwards's Botanical Register (as Eria floribunda)

Scientific classification
- Kingdom: Plantae
- Clade: Tracheophytes
- Clade: Angiosperms
- Clade: Monocots
- Order: Asparagales
- Family: Orchidaceae
- Subfamily: Epidendroideae
- Genus: Pinalia
- Species: P. floribunda

Binomial name
- Pinalia floribunda (Lindl.) Kuntze

Synonyms
- List of synonyms: Eria floribunda Lindl.; Trias floribunda (Lindl.) Mason; Urostachya floribunda (Lindl.) Brieger; Eria leucostachya Lindl.; Eria euryantha Schltr.; Eria subaliena Gagnep.; Eria giungii Guillaumin; Urostachya euryantha (Schltr.) Brieger

= Pinalia floribunda =

Species of orchid

Pinalia floribunda is a species of orchid found in Myanmar, Thailand, Vietnam, Malaysia, Indonesia and the Philippines in montane forests at elevations of 500 to 2400 meters above sea level. It is a small to medium-sized, warm-to-cold growing epiphyte found on large trees along streams. It has erect, stem-like, narrow ellipsoid pseudo-bulbs carrying soft leaves that flower in the spring.

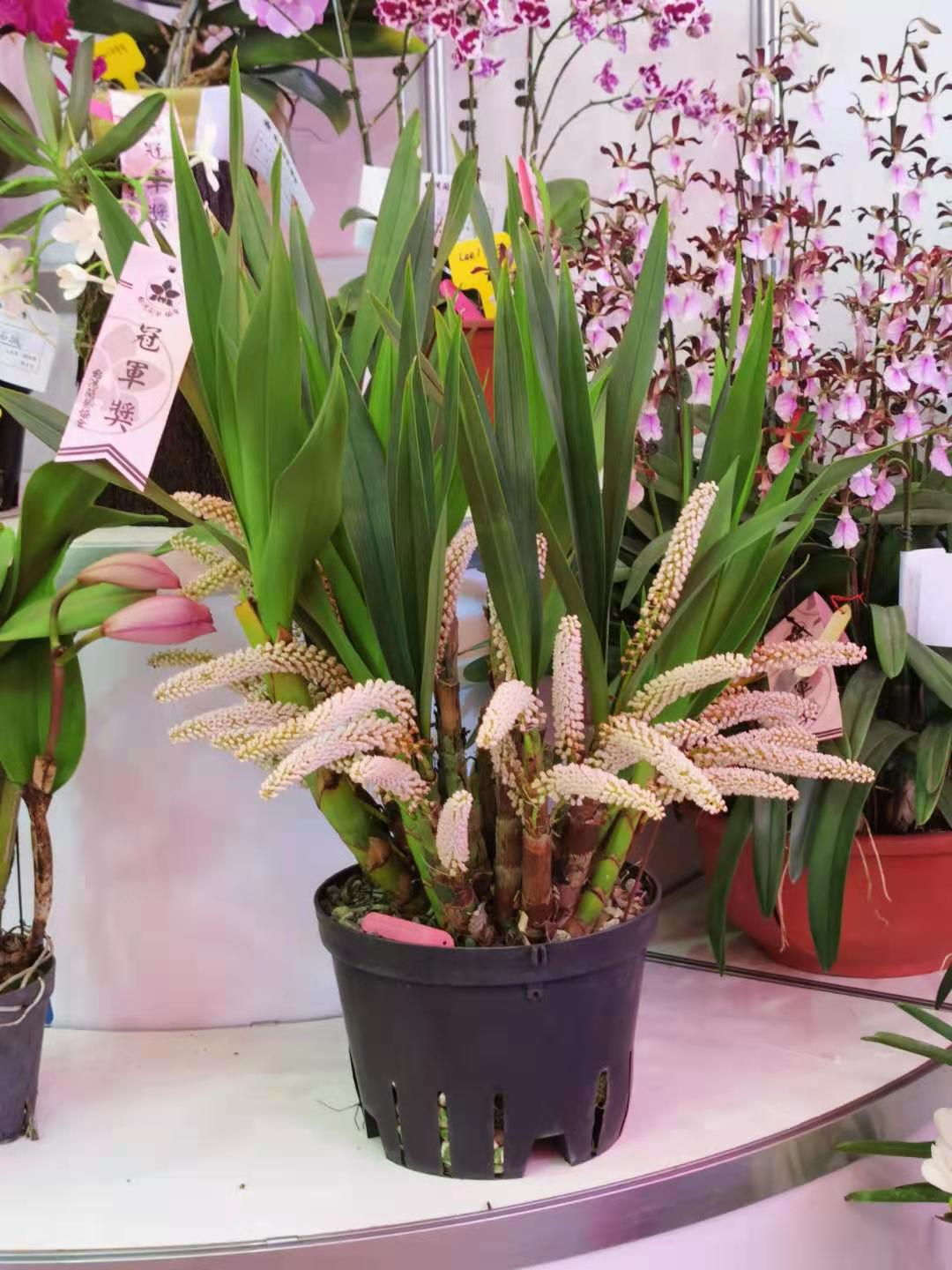

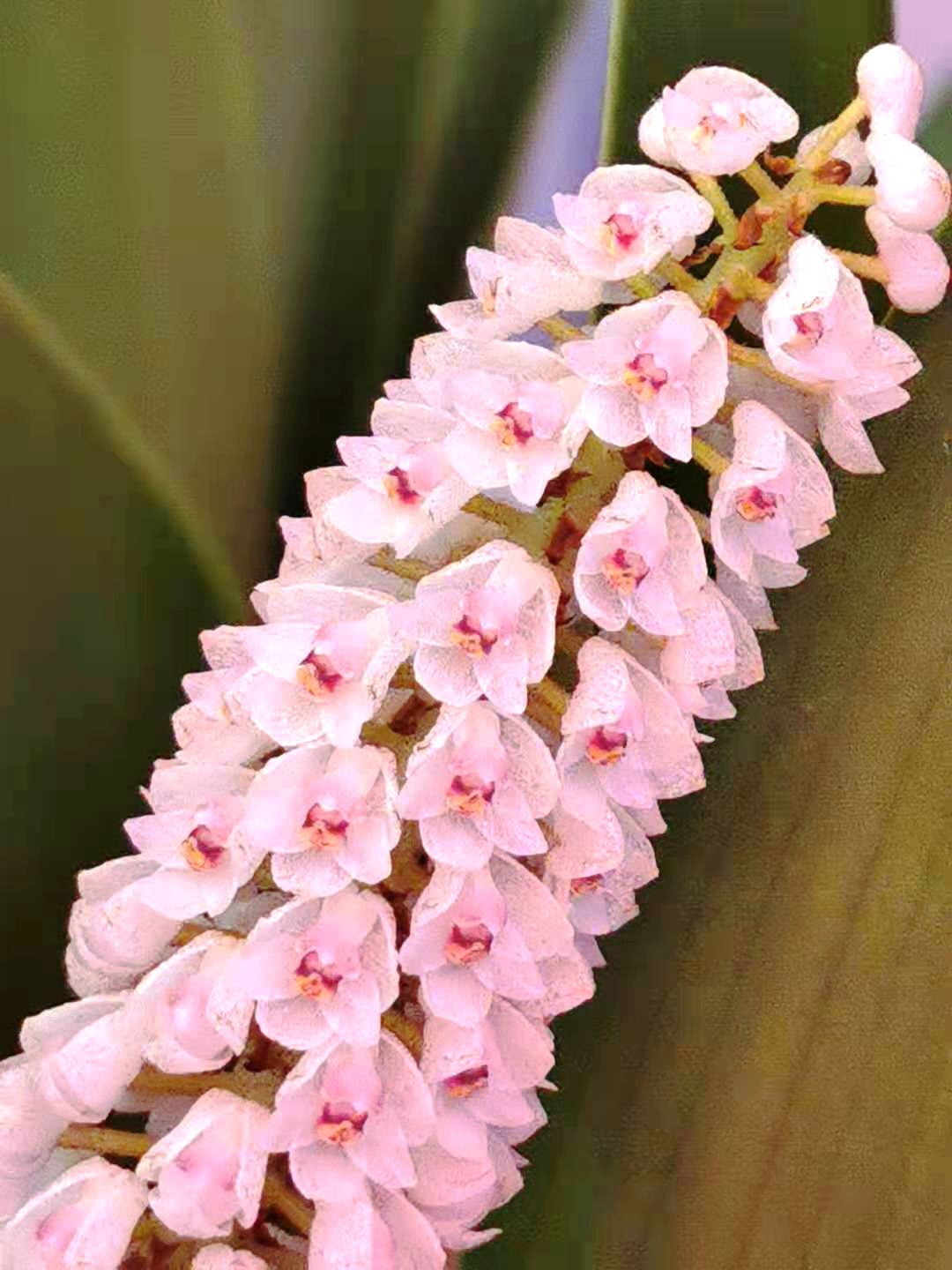
